= Somerset Fox =

English Royalist soldier and politician (1618-1689)

Colonel Somerset Fox MP

MP for Ludlow
- In office 1670–1679

Personal details
- Born: 1618 Caynham, Shropshire
- Died: 1689 (aged 70–71) Ludlow
- Parent(s): Somerset Fox (d.1643); Anne Long
- Occupation: Landowner, soldier, conspirator, politician

Military service
- Allegiance: Royalists
- Years of service: 1642 to 1646
- Rank: Colonel
- Battles/wars: First English Civil War; Siege of Bristol

Somerset Fox (18 January 1618 – 1689) occasionally spelled Sommerset or Summerset Fox, was an English Royalist soldier and landowner who fought in the First English Civil War. Following the war he was accused of taking part in Gerard's conspiracy to assassinate Oliver Cromwell and pleaded guilty to a charge of high treason, one of only two men in English history to do so.

Fox escaped the death penalty, though was sentenced to transportation. After the restoration of the monarchy he served as Member of Parliament for Ludlow.

== Biography ==
Fox was born in 1618 at Caynham, Shropshire, the eldest son of landowner Somerset Fox of Gwernygo, Montgomeryshire, and Anne, daughter of Sir Walter Long. Fox's father was the son of Sir Edward Fox and his wife Elizabeth Somerset, granddaughter of the Earl of Worcester. The Fox family had been involved in the administration of the Ludlow area of Shropshire since the 15th century.

Fox matriculated at the University of Leiden in 1633. During the English Civil War he rose to the post of colonel in the Royalist army, having previously seen military service on the Continent; he served under Prince Rupert in the garrison of Bristol. In 1646 he was involved in surrendering the garrison of Ludlow to Parliamentary forces under John Birch, following which he went into exile.

In May 1654 Fox, Peter Vowell, and Fox's cousin John Gerard were arrested for plotting to attack Lord Protector Oliver Cromwell's bodyguard with a party of cavalry, and to assassinate him as he travelled to Hampton Court. Fox's role was allegedly to recruit apprentices for the plot. At their trial by the High Court of Justice sitting in Westminster Hall on 30 June 1654, Fox pleaded guilty. He was one of only two men accused of treason ever to do so, the other being John Amery in 1945. Vowell and Gerard were found guilty and executed. As he had confessed, Fox was sentenced to be transported to Barbados, though he appears to have still been in England as late as 1656.

Fox returned after the Restoration and was granted a pension of £300 by Charles II. He was elected to the constituency of Ludlow in a 1670 by-election during the "Cavalier Parliament". He died unmarried at Ludlow in 1689.

Parliament of England
Preceded by Timothy Littleton	Member of Parliament for Ludlow with Job Charlton 1670–1679; Francis Charlton 1679; 1670–1679	Succeeded by Thomas Walcot
