= Gilbert Gerard (governor of Worcester) =

Sir Gilbert Gerard
- Died: January 1646
- Burial place: Worcester
- Relatives: Ratcliffe Gerard (brother); Charles Gerard, 1st Earl of Macclesfield (nephew)
- Military career
- Allegiance: Cavalier
- Rank: Colonel
- Commands: Governor of Worcester
- Conflicts: English Civil War; Battle of Edgehill; Battle of Brentford; Storming of Bristol; First Battle of Newbury; Battle of Stourbridge Heath; Battle of Tipton Green

Colonel Sir Gilbert Gerard (died January 1646) was a Royalist officer during the English Civil War. He served as Governor of Worcester, fighting a campaign against the Parliamentarian Tinker Fox, and died there in 1646 with the conflict still ongoing. (Note: Some sources spell his name Sir Gilbert Gerrard) (Note: The Worcestershire historian J.W. Willis-Bund (1843–1928) noted that "Sir Gilbert Gerrard is one of those men of whom it is most difficult to give an accurate account. As there were no less than seven Colonel Gerrards in the Royalist army, and at least three had the name of Gilbert, it is very hard to avoid confusion".)

== Early life ==
Gilbert and Ratcliffe were twin sons of Ratcliffe Gerard, (Note: Ratcliffe Gerard the elder, was the younger son of Gilbert Gerard (died 1593) and Ann, daughter of Thomas Ratcliffe of Winmarleigh and of Isabel Boteler.) and Elizabeth, daughter and heir of Sir Charles Somerset. (Note: Sir Charles Somerset K.B. fifth son, of Henry, Earl of Worcester.)

== 1642: The first campaign and Edgehill ==
Gerard was the colonel of a Royalist regiment of foot (his twin brother, Ratcliffe, was his lieutenant-colonel) that was already in the field before the first major pitched battle took place. Gerard's Regiment joined two other Lancashire Royalist regiments under the command of Sir Charles Gerard's (his nephew) and Lord Molyneux in besieged Manchester, but they failed to take the city before they left for the general rendezvous with the Royalist army which was assembling in Shropshire before advancing towards London. The advancing Royalist army fought the Parliamentary army at Edgehill (23 October 1642) in an indecisive engagement. Gerard's regiment fought in the front line along with Molyneux and a Welsh regiment of Sir Thomas Salusbury, and although indecisive the battle for those in the front line came to a push of pikes.

After the advance on London and the Battle of Brentford, Gerard marched with his regiment and that of Molyneux to Brill to take up his appointment of Governor of Brill and to oversee its fortification and to defend the place against incursions by Parliamentary forces. It was one of several satellite locations chosen to protect Oxford and the King's court, and so Gerard oversaw the building of earthworks to turn the area near the Church into a fort. While Molyneux was absent Gerard with the aid of a regiment of horse (cavalry) commanded by Colonel Charles Gerard, beat off a strong attack by Colonel Arthur Goodwin on 27 January 1643.

== 1643: Campaigning in the south west and Governor of Worcester ==
For the summer campaign of 1643 Gerard and his regiment were assigned to the Royalist forces in the south west. They were involved in the siege and storming of Bristol (26 July 1643) and were in the front-line at the First Battle of Newbury on 20 September 1643. In December Gerard took up an appointment as Governor of Worcester and his regiment garrisoned the town.

In the last quarter of 1643 Tinker Fox took possession of Edgbaston Hall and made it his headquarters. From there he sent expeditions all over the north of Worcestershire "to smite the Amalekite" (1 Samuel 15:3). At first his raids were just a nuisance but they could be contained by local Royalist forces. However Fox was commissioned as a colonel by the Earl of Denbigh in March 1644 to command the regiment at Edgbaston, which by June 1644 consisted of 256 mounted men, and by July was made up of three separate troops commanded by Fox himself, his brother Reighnold and his brother-in-law Humphrey Tudman. Defending North Worcestershire from his raids would ultimately prove too much for the local commanders and so 1644 they would appeal to Gerard for assistance.

== 1644: Tinker Fox, Dudley Castle and the race to Evesham ==
When the English Parliament allied its cause with that of the Scottish Covenanters with the Solemn League and Covenant, the Royalists were forced to redeploy their forces to meet an invading Scottish army, the vanguard of which crossed the border in late January 1644. To prevent Parliament from isolating Royalist forces in the north, Prince Rupert was ordered to do his best to provide for the security of Shrewsbury, Chester and North Wales, and to raise the siege of Newark-on-Trent (as task he was to complete by 21 March 1644). Rupert's men left Oxford on Tuesday, Rupert followed on and caught up with them, and arrived at the head of his army at Worcester on 8 February. From there he went to Bewdley to attend a rendezvous with the leading Royalist officers (including Gerard) in command of various garrisons in Worcestershire. The meeting lasted for several days and it was not until 15 February Rupert moved on to Bridgnorth in Shropshire.

On 22 March 1644, Fox's brother, Reighnold led an expedition with 300 men with the intention of capturing Stourton Castle and garrisoned it. This was done successfully, and Stourton became a thorn in the side of the north Worcestershire Royalists. Major Hervey applied to Gerard, for help to take Stourton Castle. Fox did his best to drive off Gerard, who had attacked the Castle with some guns and troops of horse. Fox engaged Gerard in a skirmish on Stourbridge Heath, just inside the Worcestershire border. Gerard seems to have been far too strong for the Parliamentarians, the Royalists' account says that they charged and routed Fox and his men, and pursued them for three miles slaying many. Fox and other officers wrote to their commander, the Earl of Denbigh, explaining that Gerard's force was too strong and asked for reinforcements. As none were forthcoming Fox could not relieve Stourton and Gerard accepted the Castle's conditional surrender before the end of the month.

In May 1644 there were moves and counter moves on Worcestershire's southern border. The Royalist commander Nicholas Mynne decided to concentrate his force on the west side of Gloucester (planning a combined attack by the Herefordshire and Gloucestershire royalists on the city). (Note: This plan was destined to fail in August 1644 when Massey won the battle of Eldersfield at Redmarley, a battle in which Mynne was slain.)

This left the Leadon valley and the Worcestershire border undefended. Taking advantage of this Edward Massey (the Parliamentary Governor of Gloucester), reinforced with a regiment of Warwickshire cavalry under the command of Colonel William Purefoy, advanced up the Leadon valley and captured Ledbury. Massey was acting in concert with Lord Denbigh, who proposed to advance on Worcester from the Warwickshire side, and if he did not attack it he would at least prevent any force being sent out to oppose Massey. This caused great alarm at Worcester. Sir Gilbert Gerard, the governor, wrote on 1 May 1644, to Rupert, complaining of the state of things, adding that at Worcester many of the town were "very base," and that if he was not sent help, "with some considerable force, the County would be ruinated". Purefoy's cavalry foraged and plundered a swathe of Worcestershire from the Severn to the Malvern Hills, Massey moved in their wake but chose to remain south of the Teme and move north west Hereford rather than north east towards Worcester. Rupert responding to the threat outlined by Gerard moved towards Massey, but he failed to coordinate his advance with Mynne and Massey, abandoning Ledbury was able to retreat back to Gloucester.

In June 1644 Garard was a member of the relief force under the command of Lord Wilmot sent from Worcester to relieve Dudley Castle which was under siege by Parliamentarians under the command of Earl of Denbigh. After an inconclusive engagement at Battle of Tipton Green, Denbigh lifted the siege.

Massey who after his retreat from Ledbury, had been ordered to advance into South Wales and had been quite successful campaigning in Monmouthshire (on 26 September he had taken Monmouth). He was now ordered to march into Oxfordshire to intercept some Welsh reinforcements which Gerard was bringing up to join the King. It was a race between Gerard and Massey, who could first get across the Cotswolds. Massey, with his own regiment, marched from Monmouth for Evesham. The fortifications there had been destroyed during Sir William Waller's visit in June, and not been renewed, nor the garrison replaced. Gerard had a shorter distance to march, so when Massey neared Evesham he found the place occupied by Gerard, with his Welsh, and his march a failure. This was not the worst for Parliament, because no sooner had Massey left Monmouth than the Royalists attacked and retook it.

In October 1644 Gerard with soldiers from the garrison in Worcester and from Dudley Castle attempted to capture Edgbaston Hall (Fox's headquarters) but returned having failed to so.

== 1645 and 1646: Kidderminster, Stourbridge and death ==
In June 1645 Charles I, realising that the military situation in Herefordshire and Worcestershire, demanded prompt military action put both counties under direct military control. Sir William Mynne, as Governor of Hereford and Gerard, as Governor of Worcester, were both authorised to impress men and horses to fill up the gaps in the regiments, to assess and levy contributions for their payment, billet and quarter them according to their convenience, and punish all disorders by martial law. The sheriffs and all other officers were ordered to assist and obey them in executing their commissions.

Towards the end of 1645, Sir Gilbert Gerard with Molyneux led another party to Stourbridge and Kidderminster, described by a Parliamentary writer as being "the most rude, ravenous, and ill-governed horse that I believe ever trod upon the earth". They hoped to be reinforced, but some men under Thomas Morgan from Gloucester defeated Sir Henry Washington, who was coming to their help, near Abberley, and when they proposed to march on Worcester, Parliament troops occupied Ombersley in force and prevented them. (Note: Moleneux on leaving Kidderminster went to Stafford, where he was attacked on 1 January 1646.)

Gerard died in January 1646, and was buried in Worcester. Colonel Samuel Sandys succeeded Gerard as Governor of Worcester. (Note: J.W. Willis-Bund gives contradictory information as to when Gerard ceased to be Governor of Worcester. On page 29 Willis-Bund writes that Gerard was governor until his death in 1645. On page 143 he states that at the beginning of 1645 Samuel Sandys became governor, but on page 173, he reports that Sir Gilbert Gerard led another party to Stourbridge and Kidderminster which J.M. Gratton places at the end of 1645. If one assumes that Willis-Bund misreported an Old Style January date in a primary source (he does not cite his source), and Sandys became governor in February 1646 (Rather than January 1645), then it does not contradict the information provided by Ronald Hutton, J.M. Gratton (that the party Gerard led was in Kidderminster in late 1645), or R. Lomas, that Gerard was still the governor on 22 December 1645 (Lomas cites the contemporary diary of Elias Asmole).)

== Family ==
Gerard married Anne, daughter and heir of Sir John Fitton, and widow of Sir John Brereton, son and heir of William, 1st Lord Brereton.
