= Battle of Stourbridge Heath =

Part of the First English Civil War (1644)

Coordinates: 52.451164°N 2.152772°W

- Part of the First English Civil War
Date	26 March 1644
Location	Stourbridge Heath
Result	Royalist victory

Belligerents
Royalists	Parliamentarians

Commanders and leaders
Sir Gilbert Gerard	Colonel "Tinker" Fox

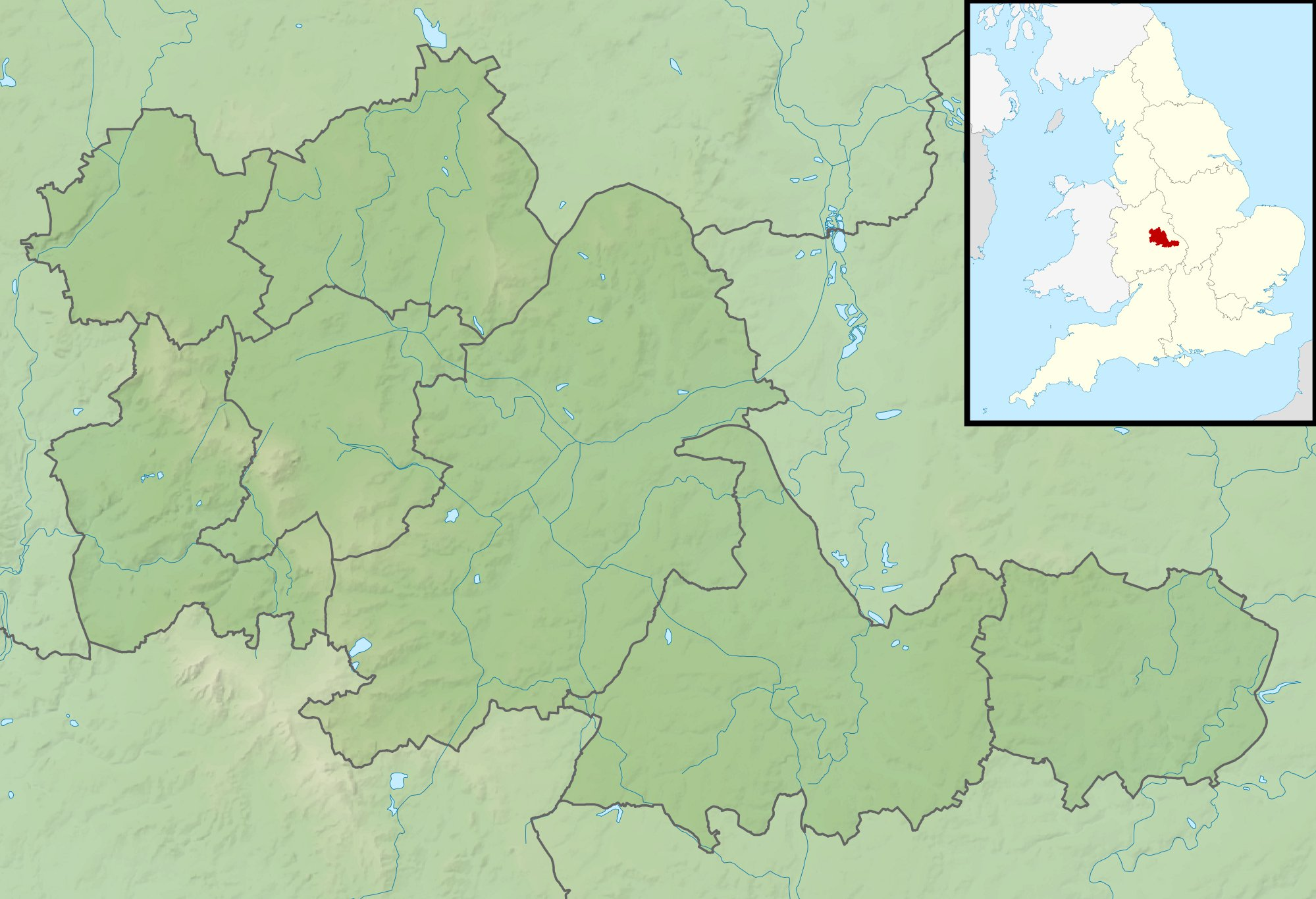
Worcestershire now within West Midlands

The Battle of Stourbridge Heath (26 March 1644) was a skirmish that took place during the First English Civil War, in which a Parliamentarian contingent under the command of Colonel "Tinker" Fox was defeated by a larger Royalist force under the command of Sir Gilbert Gerard, Governor of Worcester.

== Prelude ==
In 1644 Colonel Fox, led a raid that succeeded in capturing Stourton Castle. His brother held the castle for the Parliamentarians however a Royalist force under the command of Sir Gilbert Gerard, Governor of Worcester, was dispatched from Worcester to lay siege to the castle.

Despite pleas for assistance Tinker Fox received no support from Basil Feilding, Earl of Denbigh, the Parliamentarian commander. Fox had no choice then but to lead a relief force from Edgbaston. Fox, however, was intercepted at Stourbridge by the Royalists. Fox's forces were bolstered by the addition of 110 men from Coventry however without support from Denbigh he was in no position to match the force fielded by Gerard.

== Location ==
The exact location of the battle is unknown. The two forces met near Stourbridge on 26 March 1644. The heath at Stourbridge is located south of the town, somewhere in the vicinity of Mary Stevens Park, however during that period Stourbridge was surrounded by heathland.

== The battle ==
The battle was a resounding victory for the Royalists. Tinker Fox's forces were routed, with the gleeful Royalists claiming that Fox was the first to flee the battlefield. Exact casualties are unknown however, Royalist accounts claim that the routed Parliamentarians were pursued for three miles, with many killed. Some prisoners were definitely taken by the Royalist forces, as Fox was later angered that men captured by the Royalists at Stourbridge Heath were not exchanged later in 1644 for a high ranking Royalist prisoner. Continual disagreement and a real or imagined lack of support was a frequent feature of Fox's relationship with his parliamentary Commanders, particularly the Earl of Denbigh.

== Aftermath ==
With no prospect of relief, the Parliamentary garrison at Stourton Castle was forced to surrender. Tinker Fox never again attempted to take on a large Royalist force directly, instead achieving remarkable success, notable the sacking of Bewdley and the raid on Dudley a matter of hours after the departure of the Royalist forces from the town, through shrewd tactical understanding and the use of his extensive intelligence network. Fox finished the war as a senior officer appointed to the County Committee for Worcestershire. Gerard continued fighting in support of the Royalist cause, dying in 1646 and is buried at Worcester.
