= Thomas Hanmer (died 1701) =

British politician

Thomas Hanmer (c.1648 – 1701), of Fenns, Flintshire, was a British politician who sat in the English Parliament briefly in 1690.

== Life ==
Hanmer was born around 1648, the only son of William Hanmer and Eleanor Warburton. He was cousin to Sir Thomas Hanmer and to Sir George Warburton. He attended Christ Church, Oxford, matriculating on 16 July 1666.

In 1690, Hanmer was chosen to represent Ludlow in the House of Commons. His electors were the Tory-dominated new corporation of Ludlow, created by James II in 1685, and headed by Hanmer's brother-in-law Francis Charlton. This election was successfully challenged by members of the old corporation, the election declared void, and Hamner ejected from his seat. He did not sit in parliament again.

Aside from a stint as High Sheriff of Flintshire in 1694, Hanmer lived "a peaceful and rural life, about the limits of which the great waves of public affairs only broke like expended rollers along a secluded shore."

== Marriage and family ==
Hanmer married Jane, the daughter of Sir Job Charlton in May 1674. The couple had two sons and a daughter before Jane's death in 1680:

- William Hanmer (1674–1724)
- Job Hanmer (1677–1739)
- Dorothy Hanmer, who married Admiral Charles Cornewall

Hanmer himself died in August 1701.

Parliament of England
Preceded by Francis Herbert; Charles Baldwyn	Member of Parliament for Ludlow; 1690; With: William Gower	Succeeded by Silius Titus; Francis Lloyd
Honorary titles
Preceded by Thomas Ravenscroft	High Sheriff of Flintshire; 1694	Succeeded by Thomas Lloyd
