= Sir Gilbert Gerard, 1st Baronet of Fiskerton =

English soldier and politician

Sir Gilbert Gerard, 1st Baronet of Fiskerton (c. 1632 – 24 September 1687) was an English soldier and politician. During the English Civil War he supported the Royalist cause. After the Restoration he sat in the House of Commons from 1661 to 1685.

== Biography ==
Gerard was the son of Ratcliffe Gerard and his wife Jennet Barret, daughter of Edward Barret, of Pembrokeshire.

His family supported the Royalist cause during the English Civil War and at the start of the first war he was commissioned as a captain into the same foot regiment as his father (the colonel of the regiment was his father's twin brother, Gilbert Gerard (died 1646)). (Note: P.A. Bolton in Gerard's biography in The History of Parliament Trust implies that his father was in his cousin's regiment instead of his uncle's. Porter writes: "He was the first cousin of Lord Gerard of Brandon, the royalist general, under whom his father served as lieutenant-colonel, while Gerard himself commanded a troop of the Life Guards". It is of course possible that his father served under both of them.) His brother John also served officer in the royalist army. From 1643 to 1646 Gerard was a captain of horse.

On 29 August 1645 a warrant was made out for Gerard to become a baronet, but formality of sealing it never took place. He also participated in the Second Civil War; he was taken prisoner at the battle of St Neots after spending a year as a prisoner of war but was allowed to leave England a year later. He was back in England by 1654, when after travelling from Worcestershire he was arrested in London as one of those implicated in the Gerard's conspiracy. Although his brother John was executed for his part in the plot, Gerard was not tried, and went and joined Charles II's court in exile. He returned to England after the death of the Lord Protector Oliver Cromwell and was a suspect member of a group of Cavalier agitators in the Bristol area.

In 1654 Gerard and John were both arrested on suspicion of being involved in the Gerard's conspiracy. Gerard was released without charge, but John was tried for high treason, was found guilty of plotting to assassinate the Lord Protector Oliver Cromwell and was executed in May of that year.

After the Restoration Gerard was a Gentleman of the Privy Chamber by June 1660 probably until 1685, he was also a lieutenant in the 1st troop of life guards commanded by his cousin (1661–1668).

Gerald also held many local government positions: Constable, Durham 1661–1676; commissioner for assessment, county Durham 1661–80, Westminster 1661–1663, Middlesex 1665–1689, 1679–1680, Lincolnshire 1673–1674, Yorkshire (North and West Ridings) 1673–1680, (East Riding) 1679–1680, improvement, Kingswood chase 1661, corporations, Yorkshire, 1662–1663, loyal and indigent officers, county Durham, London and Westminster 1662; justice of the peace county Durham 1663–1680, (North Riding) 1676–1680, Middlesex 1677–1680; deputy-lieutenant county Durham 1663–c.1680, (North Riding) by 1679–c.1680; sheriff, county Durham 1665–1675; commissioner for recusants, county Durham and North Riding 1675. He was also Joint farmer of excise, Cumberland and Westmld. c.1661, county Durham and Northumbland by 1661–1665; master of Greatham hospital county Durham 1663 until he died(?); and a freeman, Hartlepool 1665.

In 1661, Gerard was elected Member of Parliament for Northallerton in the Cavalier Parliament and was re-elected to the same constituency in March and October 1679 and again in 1681. He was created baronet of Fiskerton in the County of Lincoln on 17 November 1666.

Between 1673 and 1680 (while the Exclusion Bill agitation was maturing) it was asserted by the country party that Charles II had legally married Lucy Walter—his mistress while exiled on the European Continent in the late 1640s and early 1650s, and the mother of his son the James, Duke of Monmouth. It was believed in course of time that the contract of marriage was preserved in a black box in the possession of Sir Gilbert, who was son-in-law of Bishop John Cosin (died 1672), a confidant of Lucy Walter. In a novel which had a wide circulation it was the designing Prince of Purdino (James) who advised his brother, King Conradus of Otenia, to marry the beautiful "Lucilious", but, in order to avoid disgusting the Otenians, to do so with the greatest privacy imaginable, and in the presence of but two witnesses, himself and the priest (Cosin). Sir Gilbert Gerard, summoned before an extraordinary meeting of the Privy Council convened by King Charles II, stated that he knew nothing whatever of such a marriage contract; and the King issued three declarations in denial of the marriage (January, March, and June 1678). One of these declarations, signed by sixteen Privy Councillors, was entered in the council book and registered in chancery.

== Family ==
Gerard married firstly Mary, daughter of Sir John Brereton with whom he had no children, and secondly Mary, daughter of John Cosin, Bishop of Durham, with whom he had a daughter, Charlotte and a son and heir Sir Gilbert Cosins Gerard, 2nd Baronet. Charlotte married John Barcroft. Gilbert married first, Mary, daughter and heiress of Charles Berkeley, 1st Earl of Falmouth, from whom he was divorced in 1684, and secondly, Lady Morlaud, but had no children from either marriage, so the baronetcy became extinct on his death.

== Notes ==
Baronetage of England
New creation	Baronet (of Fiskerton); 1666–1687	Succeeded by Gilbert Cosin-Gerard
