= Gerard baronets of Fiskerton (1666) =

Escutcheon of the Gerard baronets of Bryn

The Gerard baronetcy of Fiskerton, Lincolnshire was created on 17 November 1666 for Gilbert Gerard, Member of Parliament for Northallerton in 1661, 1679 and 1681. A first cousin of Charles Gerard, he was a Royalist Commander of the English Civil War.

== Gerard baronets of Fiskerton, Lincolnshire (1666) ==
- Sir Gilbert Gerard, 1st Baronet of Fiskerton (died 1687)
- Sir Gilbert Cosin-Gerard, 2nd Baronet (1662 – c. 1730). He is not known to have left a male heir, and the baronetcy became extinct on his death.
