= Humphrey Baggerley =

Humphrey Baggerley (fl. 1650s), was a royalist captain during the English Civil War and continued to support the Royalist cause during the Interregnum.

== Biography ==
Baggerley was in the service of James Stanley, 7th Earl of Derby. He was employed in the embarkation of that nobleman in the Isle of Man on 12 August 1651. On 13 October the Earl applied that Captain Baggerley, who was then a prisoner at Chester, might be allowed to attend him during the few hours he had to live. The request was granted, and it is to Baggerley's pen that we are indebted for a minute and touching narrative of the Earl's final hours and execution. This narrative has been printed by Draper in his account of the "House of Stanley", 1864.

In 1654 Captain Baggerley was imprisoned in London for taking part in what was called Gerard's conspiracy. He subsequently acted as steward to William Stanley, 9th Earl of Derby.
