= William Eyre of Neston =

English parliamentarian army officer and politician

Sometimes confused with his contemporary William Eyre (leveller)

William Eyre of Neston, Wiltshire (fl. 1642–1660), was a parliamentarian army officer and politician.

Eyre fought for the parliamentary cause in the English Civil War. He may have risen from the rank of captain of foot to colonel (the latter rank probably being held in the Wiltshire militia). On 29 November 1648 he was returned as the member of parliament for Chippenham and was admitted to the Rump Parliament on 15 January 1649. At the end of the Protectorate, the restored Rump commissioned him colonel of a regiment of foot previously commanded by John Lambert. However, along with other officers whom General George Monck believed to be unsympathetic to the restoration of the monarchy, he was relieved of his command.
