= Ratcliffe Gerard =

English landowner

Ratcliffe Gerard (c.1584 – in or before 1670) of Halsall, Lancashire was an English landowner who served in the Royalist army during the Wars of the Three Kingdoms.

== Biography ==
Ratcliffe and Gilbert were twin sons of Ratcliffe Gerard, (Note: Ratcliffe Gerard the elder, was the younger son of Gilbert Gerard (died 1593) and Ann, daughter of Thomas Ratcliffe of Winmarleigh and of Isabel Boteler.) and Elizabeth, daughter and heir of Sir Charles Somerset. (Note: Sir Charles Somerset K.B. fifth son, of Henry, Earl of Worcester.)

Gerard and his two sons, Gilbert and John, joined the Royalist army. Ratcliffe was a lieutenant-colonel in twin brother's regiment. He was in Raglan Castle at its surrender in 1646, and was one of the few English Royalists to take up arms for Charles II in 1651 and was captured at the Battle of Wigan Lane. In 1658 he was known to be a non-Catholic Royalist activist in Lancashire.

== Family ==
Gerard married Jennet Barret, daughter of Edward Barret, of Pembrokeshire. They had several children including:

- Gilbert (died 1687) who was created Baronet of Fiskerton
- John (1632–1654), who was executed for his part in Gerard's conspiracy
- Charles (born 1635)
