= Sir Job Charlton, 1st Baronet =

English judge and politician (died 1697)

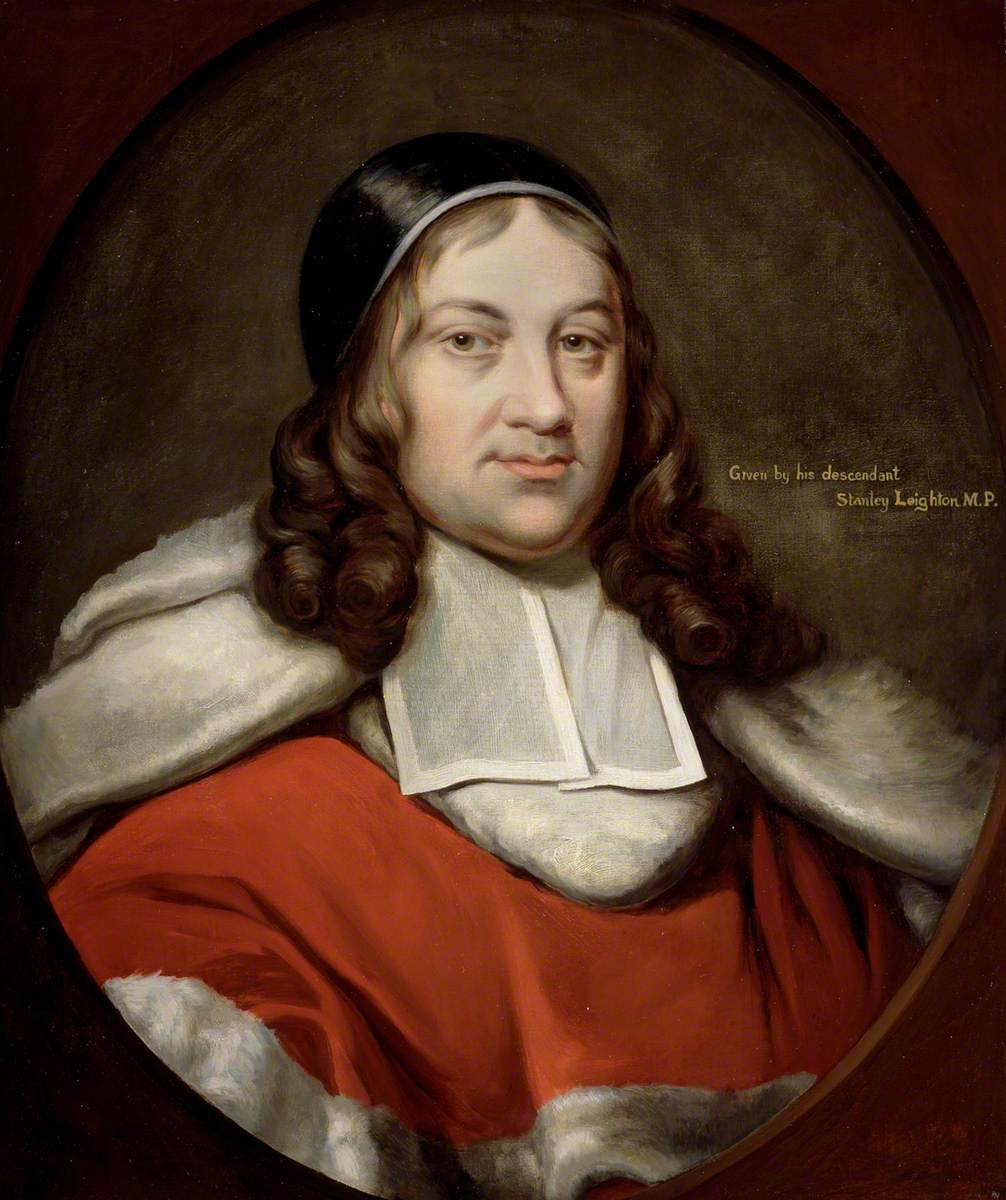
c.1886 portrait of Charlton by Francis Bridge

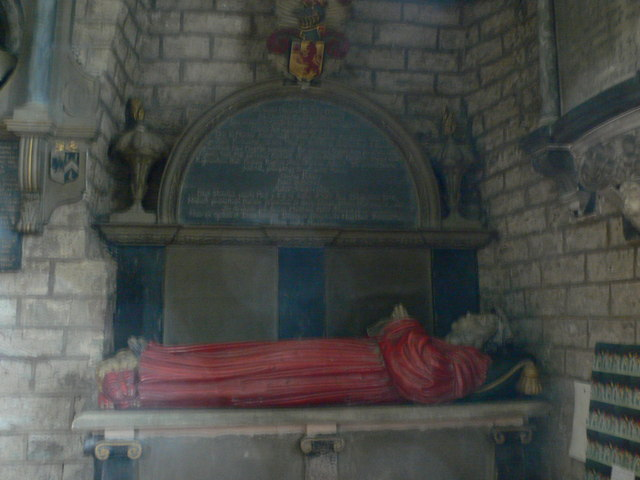
Sir Job Charlton

Sir Job Charlton, 1st Baronet KS (c. 1614 – 26 May 1697) was an English judge and politician who sat in the House of Commons between 1659 and 1679. He was Speaker of the House of Commons of England briefly in 1673.

== Life ==
Charlton was born in London, the only surviving son of Robert Charlton, goldsmith, of Mincing Lane, London and perhaps of Whitton Court, Shropshire, and his first wife Emma Harby, daughter of Thomas Harby of Adstone, Northamptonshire. He matriculated at Magdalen Hall, Oxford on 20 April 1632, aged 17. He was a student of Lincoln's Inn in 1633 and was called to the bar in 1640.

In 1659, Charlton was elected Member of Parliament for Ludlow in the Third Protectorate Parliament. He was elected MP for Ludlow again in 1660 for the Convention Parliament. He was a justice of the Oxford circuit in July 1660 and was created serjeant-at-law in October 1660. In 1661, he was re-elected MP for Ludlow for the Cavalier Parliament. He served as a justice of the Chester circuit from 1661 to 1662. He was made a King's Serjeant in 1668.

Charlton served as Speaker from 4 to 18 February 1673, pleading ill health to retire. He left Parliament in 1679, and was forced out of the post of Chief Justice of Chester in 1680 when Judge Jeffreys desired it, being placed in the Court of Common Pleas instead. In lieu of that office Charlton was, on 26 April 1680, made chief justice of the common pleas; but having given his opinion in opposition to the king's dispensing power, he was removed from office on 26 April 1680. He was, however, restored to the chief justiceship of Chester in 1686, and on 12 May that year was created a baronet.

He died at his seat at Ludford, (then in Herefordshire but now in Shropshire), 29 May 1697.

== Family ==
He was a direct descendant of Edward I and a cousin to Catherine Parr.

By his first wife, Dorothy (marriage 31 March 1645), daughter and heiress of William Blunden of Bishop's Castle, he had four sons and three daughters, including:

- Sir Francis Charlton, 2nd Baronet
- Jane Charlton, married Thomas Hanmer
- Dorothy Charlton, married Sir Edward Leighton, 1st Baronet
- Mary Charlton, married a Mr Burrell of Essex

Following the death of his first wife in 1658, he went on to marry Lettice Waring on 12 November 1663, cousin of his first wife and daughter of Walter Waring of Oldbury. They had one son and one daughter:

- Gilbert Charlton
- Emma Charlton, first married to Thomas Cornwallis of Abermarlais, Carmarthenshire, by whom she had five children; then to John Robinson, Bishop of London

The baronetcy became extinct with the fourth holder in 1784.

Parliament of England
Preceded by John Aston	Member of Parliament for Ludlow with Samuel Baldwyn 1659; Timothy Littleton 1660–1670; Somerset Fox 1670–1679; 1659–1679	Succeeded by Somerset Fox; Francis Charlton
Political offices
Preceded by Sir Edward Turnour	Speaker of the House of Commons; 1672	Succeeded by Sir Edward Seymour
Legal offices
Preceded by Sir Geoffrey Palmer, Bt	Chief Justice of Chester; 1662–1680	Succeeded by Sir George Jeffreys
Preceded by Sir Edward Lutwyche	Chief Justice of Chester; 1686–1689	Succeeded by Sir John Trenchard
Baronetage of England
New creation	Baronet (of Ludford); 1686–1697	Succeeded by Francis Charlton
