= Tinker Fox =

Colonel John "Tinker" Fox (1610–1650), sometimes mistaken for the MP Thomas Fox, was a parliamentarian soldier in the English Civil War. Commanding a garrison at Edgbaston House in Warwickshire – a location that guarded the main roads from strongly parliamentarian Birmingham to royalist Worcestershire – Fox operated largely independently of the parliamentarian hierarchy, all factions of which tended to view him with suspicion. Though lauded by the parliamentarian press for his "continual motion and action", to royalist propagandists Fox became an icon of dangerous and uncontrolled subversiveness, being decried as a "low-born tinker" whose troops "rob and pillage very sufficiently". By 1649 Fox's notoriety was such that he was widely, though wrongly, rumoured to be one of the executioners of Charles I.

== Life and career ==
Fox was baptised in the parish church of Walsall, Staffordshire on 1 April 1610 and is recorded marrying in the same church 1634. He probably worked in the metal trades of nearby Birmingham – the origin of his caricature as a tinker – before serving as a captain in the Roundhead cavalry under Lord Brooke from February 1643.

By October 1643 Fox had recruited a garrison to occupy Edgbaston Hall, to the south east of Birmingham, a town whose puritan traditions had made it a bastion of support for Parliament, and whose metal trades provided Fox with a fertile recruiting ground. Fox was commissioned as a colonel by the Earl of Denbigh in March 1644 to command the regiment at Edgbaston, which by June 1644 consisted of 256 horse, dragoons and scouts, and by July was made up of three separate troops commanded by Fox himself, his brother Reighnold and his brother-in-law Humphrey Tudman. The royalist newspaper Mercurius Aulicus quickly sought to capitalise on Fox's background:

one Fox, a tinker of Walsall, in Staffordshire, having got a horse and his hammer for a poleaxe, invited to his society 16 men of his brethren … marched seven miles to Birmingham in Warwickshire near which Towne they fortified a house called Edgebaston House … In this house they have nestled so long that their 16 are swollen up to 200, which rob and pillage very sufficiently.

— Mercurius Aulicus

Fox's garrison was highly active: his men probably took part in the attack on Aston Hall on 28 December 1643, removing the main royalist base in the Birmingham area, and Fox's troops would regularly patrol local roads to intercept merchants heading towards royalist areas

On 22 March 1644, his brother led a raid in which they captured Stourton Castle. The royalists lay siege to the castle, so Fox led a relief column, but it was intercepted and routed by royalists under the command of Sir Gilbert Gerard, the Governor of Worcester, in an action on Stourbridge Heath. With no hope of relief the Parliamentary garrison of Stourton Castle surrendered on terms.

Undaunted on 3 May 1644 — in an escapade that in the opinion of historian J. W. Willis-Bund "reads far more like an incident out of 'The Three Musketeers', or some other of Dumas' novels than an actual event" — sixty of Fox's troops raided the royalist garrison at Bewdley, taking forty prisoners including Sir Thomas Lyttelton, the royalist governor.

Fox also had a very capable intelligence network which regularly passed timely information onto the Earl of Denbigh: predicting Prince Rupert of the Rhine's rendezvous at Bloxwich and subsequent move to Newark on 18 March 1644 and passing on the location of the King himself on 8 July. In December 1644, Fox raided Dudley a matter of hours after the departure of its royalist garrison.

That September, Fox headed the list of officers appointed to the County Committee for Worcestershire, a county still largely in royalist hands. They were authorised to meet at Hawkesley House (in Kings Norton), a new garrison established by Fox.

Throughout his occupation of Edgbaston, Fox seems to have been ill-provided with money to feed and pay his troops. He was accused of having unruly soldiers and of embezzlement, but his lack of funding from the Warwick County Committee makes the behaviour hardly surprising. He died in 1650 in great debt, and leaving his children impoverished and dependent on his brother-in-law, Humphrey Tudman.

== See also ==
- Worcestershire in the English Civil War
