= Charlton baronets =

Extinct baronetcy in the Baronetage of England

There have been two Charlton Baronetcies:

Escutcheon of the Charlton baronetcies

The Baronetcy of Charlton of Hesleyside was created in the Baronetage of England on 6 March 1645 for Edward Charlton of Hesleyside Hall, Northumberland a descendant of the Border Reiver family, but was extinct on his death. His descendants still own the estate.

The Baronetcy of Charlton of Ludford was created in the Baronetage of England on 12 May 1686 for Sir Job Charlton (knighted 1662) of Ludford House, Ludford, Shropshire. Charlton was educated at Magdalen College, Oxford and admitted to Lincoln's Inn in 1633. He was appointed Sergeant at Law in 1660, Chief Justice of Chester in 1662 and Justice of the Court of Common Pleas (England) in 1680. He was Member of Parliament for Ludlow and was briefly Speaker of the House of Commons in 1673. His son, the second Baronet, was Member of Parliament for Ludlow and later Bishops Castle and was high sheriff of Shropshire in 1698. The Baronetcy was extinct on the death of the fourth Baronet and the Shropshire estate passed to his nephew Nicholas Lechmere Charlton. The public house in Ludford (the Charlton Arms) is named after the baronets.

== Charlton of Hesleyside (1645) ==
- Sir Edward Charlton, 1st Baronet (died 1674)

== Charlton of Ludford (1686) ==
- Sir Job Charlton, 1st Baronet (1614–1697)
- Sir Francis Charlton, 2nd Baronet (1651–1729)
- Sir Blunden Charlton, 3rd Baronet (1682–1742)
- Sir Francis Charlton, 4th Baronet (1707–1784)
