= Gerard baronets =

Set index for Gerard baronets

There have been three baronetcies created for the surname Gerard, historically associated with Lancashire.

- Gerard baronets of Bryn (1611)
- Gerard baronets of Harrow on the Hill (1620)
- Gerard baronets of Fiskerton (1666)
