= William Eyre (leveller) =

English Parliamentary army officer

William Eyre (fl. 1634–1675) was an English Parliamentary army officer in the English Civil War and a Leveller.

== Early life ==
Eyre's origins are unknown, but Paul Hardacre writing in the ODNB suggests that as he held a captain's rank in the Parliamentary cavalry in the First English Civil War, but started as a sergeant, he may have come from a rural middling sort–one of Cromwell's "plain, russet-coated captain[s] ...". In The Serious Representation (which he wrote in 1649 while a prisoner in Oxford), he states that in the middle of the 1630s he was forced to leave England for New-England because he opposed the Service Book.

== First Civil War ==
In 1642 Eyre was a sergeant in Denzil Holles's regiment, and fought at Battle of Edgehill. Just over three weeks later he was with the regiment when it was destroyed by a detachment of the Royalist army under the command of Prince Rupert at Battle of Brentford. Eyre joined the Eastern Association and was commissioned by Oliver Cromwell a quartermaster in his own troop. Shortly afterwards he was promoted to captain of the sixth troop in Cromwell's regiment of horse. He fought under Cromwell in the Lincolnshire campaign of 1643. When the Parliamentary army left Sleaford on 13 January 1644, Eyre's troop along with two others were left to secure the country around the town. But later that month his troop and two others were captured after a being surprised by Royalists while they slept. His relationship with Cromwell deteriorated as their political views diverged and Eyre resigned his commission that summer.

== Marriage and property in Ireland, 1647 ==
In 1647 Eyre married Mary, née Leycester, who had outlived two previous husbands, Calcott Chambre (or Culvert Chambers) and of Job Ward. Chambre's father had bought the half-barony of Shillelagh and Carnew Castle in County Wicklow, Ireland, so through his marriage to Chambre's widow, Eyre now acquired a right to this property. He now had an interest in property in Ireland, and Sir Thomas Fairfax nominated Eyre to be a colonel of a regiment of foot in the Parliamentary expeditionary force to be sent to Ireland.

== Corkbush Field rendezvous, 1647 ==
On 17 November 1647, although his regiment was not part of the New Model Army, Eyre attended the Corkbush Field rendezvous in Hampshire and when he incited the troops to accept the Leveller's Agreement of the People he was arrested for inciting mutiny. He, and fellow levellers arrested at the same time, were hailed as martyrs by their supporters. The ordinary soldiers were tried and sentenced at a court martial on 3 December. Eyre's trial along with other officers was postponed. Eyre was never tried because he agreed to submit to military discipline and on 23 December he was allowed to return to his regiment which was cantoned in Worcestershire.

== Second English Civil War ==
=== Broadway meeting, 1648 ===
In January 1648 Eyre attended the Broadway meeting where 80 officers of five regiments to discuss their men's grievances foremost of which is back pay. It is possible that the officers discussed plans for a mutiny and to pre-empt this, or for other reasons, in February Eyre's regiment was disband.

=== Henry Marten's Regiment in Berkshire, 1648 ===
After the disbanding of his regiment, Eyre moved to Berkshire and aided Henry Marten (Eyre's farm was adjacent to Marten's estate), a member of the Berkshire county committee to raise a regiment of cavalry. The regiment was unauthorised by Parliament, but as the country was in the midst of the Second Civil War, Marten and Eyre ignored summons from Parliament and refused to appear in Westminster in person to explain themselves. The regiment was reported in the Mercurius Pragmaticus (a knowledgeable contemporary newspaper) said that the regiment claimed to be "for the people's freedom against all tyrants whatsoever" and were 1,500 strong, made up of serving Leveller troopers encouraged to leave (desert) their regiments for this unofficial one, and local yeomen farmers. They equipped themselves in various ways including they said requisitioning arms, ammunition and mounts from known delinquents such as Lord Craven. One of the victims of this unauthorised requisitioning was Sir Humphrey Foster. He named Eyre as one of the Offices involved in the requisitioning of this property, for which he had three men arrayed before the Assizes in Wiltshire. This move came to nothing when the men brandishing their swords refused to recognise the legitimacy of the arrayment.

Over the next few months the regiment was active in supporting the New Model Army and with his Presbetryan enemies purged by Pride the members of the Rump Parliament commissioned Marten's regiment into the New Model Army.

== Commonwealth ==
Henry Marten had made some political moves that protected him against charges ordering the billeting of men without authorisation, however Eyre failed to persuade Fairfax, the Lord General of the New Model Army, that he had Cromwell's permission to do the same. In February 1649 after Fairfax turned down Eyre offer to take his three troops of horse to Ireland, he ordered the disbanding of the troops and Eyre's decommissioning.

=== Burford mutiny, 1649 ===
In May 1649 Eyre, who was now a civilian, took part in the Leveller-influenced Burford mutiny. He joined with the Salisbury mutineers and was captured at an inn in Burford on the night that Cromwell captured the Banbury mutineers at Burford Church. Eyre justified his actions in front of Fairfax and Cromwell by saying "if ... but ten men appeared for [the cause] , I would make eleven" Three days later Eyre was taken to Oxford and placed in its prison.

=== Imprisonment in Oxford and Warwick, and residency in Ireland ===
In July 1649, the Council of State was aware of unrest that would lead to the Oxford Mutiny; and not wishing to have a known mutineer in the area, ordered Eyre's transfer to Warwick Castle. While imprisoned there Eyre wrote to the Council of State recognising that he had made mistakes and had been misled; and requested that he might be given permission to join his family in Ireland. After spending about a year in Warwick, Eyre was released from prison on 1 August 1650. From there Eyre travelled to Ireland, and with the help of Henry Ireton, the Lord Deputy of Ireland, he gained possession of Shillelagh.

== Protectorate ==
By 1654 Eyre had left Ireland for London and was conspiring with his old Leveller companions against the Protectorate. On returning to Ireland he was arrested and justified his plotting by referring to the principles in the Solemn Engagement of 1647 agreed to by himself, Ireton (the probable author of the engagement), and Cromwell. He said that although he loved and honoured the Lord Protector Cromwell even he could be corrupted by power. After several months when it became clear that the authorities were going to hold him indefinitely without trial he applied to join Robert Venables's expedition, then at Hispaniola. But his application was turned down and he remain in incarcerated until the end of the protectorate. While he was in prison a number of civil suits were entered against his claim to the Shillelagh and Carnew Castle estates.

== Restoration ==
=== Nine years in prison ===
Eyre was briefly at liberty during the period of the restored Commonwealth of 1659. But was rearrested in May 1660 as a threat to the restored monarchy of Charles II. While being held in Dublin Castle he was accused of trying to foment a mutiny among the Irish foot guards, and while there was not enough evidence to try him for treason, the new regime decided that he was too dangerous to release and was held in various prisons for the next nine years.

=== Appeals for recovery of his Irish estates ===
Eyre was released in December 1669, and with his daughter travelled to London to present his claim to the Shillelagh and Carnew Castle estates to parliament and King Charles. He published two appeals, the first was The Case of William Eyres, Esq. in which he accused the Earl of Strafford, C. Chambre, J. and Nathaniel Fiennes, J. Crew, Sir Philip Percival, the Countess of Carlisle, Leycester of Cheshire, J. Carpenter, H. Wentworth, Col. Jos. Temple, and others of illegally obtaining the estates comprising upwards of 60,000 acres (240 km^{2}), while he was in prison. The second was titled A Particular Deduction of the Case of William Eyre, and described what Eyre considered his right to the Barony of Shelah and Castle of Carnow, in the County of Wicklow, that was in the possession of 2nd Earl of Strafford. The Earl of Strafford claimed that The Case of William Eyres, Esq. had libelled both himself and his father, and presented it as evidence to the House of Lords' Privileges Committee in May 1675. This is the last historical record of Eyre's life; there is no known record of what action if any the Privileges Committee took and of the rest of Eyre's life and death.

== Bibliography ==
- The serious representation of Col. Wiliam Eyre prisoner in the castle at Oxford. (1649)
- A particular deduction of the case of William Eyre Esq. : concerning his right to the half barony of Shelelah and Castle of Carnow ... : humbly presented to the King's Most Excellent Majesty ... (1675?)
- The case of William Eyres, esq. concerning his estate in Ireland (1675?)
