= Samuel Baldwyn =

English lawyer and politician

Sir Samuel Baldwyn (ca. 1618 – 15 July 1683) was an English lawyer and politician who sat in the House of Commons in 1659.

Baldwyn was the son of Charles Baldwyn of Burwarton, Shropshire. He matriculated at Balliol College, Oxford on 6 March 1635, aged 16 and was called to the bar at Inner Temple in 1646. In 1659, he was elected Member of Parliament for Ludlow. He became a bencher on his Inn in 1662. In 1669 he became serjeant-at-law and in 1672 became King's serjeant. He was knighted on 5 February 1673.

Baldwyn died at the age of about 64 and was buried in Temple Church on 17 July 1683, where there is a monument and arms.

Baldwyn married by licence dated 25 July 1648, Elizabeth Walcott of St. Thomas the Apostle. His son Charles was also MP for Ludlow.

Parliament of England
Preceded by John Aston	Member of Parliament for Ludlow; 1659; With: Job Charlton	Succeeded by Thomas Mackworth; Thomas Moor
