= Peter Vowell =

English schoolteacher and Royalist who was found guilty of high treason

Peter Vowell (died 10 July 1654) was an English schoolteacher and a Royalist who was found guilty of high treason for his part in Gerard's conspiracy, a plot to assassinate Oliver Cromwell, and hanged.

== Biography ==
In May 1654 Vowell, Summerset Fox and John Gerard, from Islington, were arrested for their part in Gerard's conspiracy, a plot to overwhelm the bodyguard of the Lord Protector Oliver Cromwell with 30 mounted men as he travelled to Hampton Court and assassinate him. The allegation against Vowell was that he was to help seize the horses while they grazed in Islington fields. The Government received intelligence of the plot and arrests were made.

On 30 June Vowell and John Gerard were found guilty of treason by the High Court of Justice sitting at Westminster Hall. Ten days later Gerard was beheaded on Tower Hill and Vowell was hanged at Charing Cross. Fox, who had pleaded guilty, was sentenced to transportation to Barbados.
