= John Gerard (Royalist) =

Royalist ensign (1632–1654)

- Born: 1632
- Died: 1654 (aged 21–22)
- Relatives: Ratcliffe Gerard and Jennet
- Military career
- Allegiance: Royalist
- Branch: Army
- Rank: Ensign
- Conflicts: English Civil War

John Gerard (1632–1654) was a Royalist ensign during the English Civil War and was executed for High Treason against the Protectorate for his part in the Gerard's conspiracy.

== Biography ==
Gerard was one of three brothers born to Ratcliffe Gerard (died in or before 1670) of Halsall, Lancashire, and his wife, Jennet (born ca. 1588), daughter of Edward Barrett of Pembrokeshire. His father and elder brother, Gilbert both served in the Royalist army during the Civil War. (Note: Gerard was first cousin with Charles Gerard, Lord Brandon (died 1694) a Royalist general and after the Restoration 1st Earl of Macclesfield.)

Gerard served in the King's army as an ensign, and by the early 1650s had entered the shady world of Royalist conspiracies to overthrow the Commonwealth and restore Charles II to the throne.

In November 1653 Gerard appeared as a witness at the trial of Don Pantaleone Sá, a brother of the Portuguese ambassador, for the murder of an Englishman. The night before the murder Gerard had overheard Pantaleone Sá and his friends talking of English affairs in the street and had given them the lie, whereupon they had attacked him, and, though a little man, yet "he threw him off that was upon him, and so was hustling with him a good while", but was rescued by a passer-by, after he had received a stab in the shoulder. Don Pantaleon Sá was affronted by what he perceived to be a slight on his honour and he returned to the location the next day with an armed retinue to seek revenge. He mistook another man for Gerard and killed him. Pantaleone Sá sought sanctuary in the ambassador's residence, but the Lord Chief Justice, Henry Rolle, supported by other expert opinions, decided that exterritoriality covered the ambassador and not members of his household in cases of murder, so Pantaleone Sá was arrested tried and found guilty of murder and sentenced to be hanged.

Early in 1654 Gerard went over to France, where he was presented to Charles II by his cousin, Charles Gerard, Lord Brandon. Soon after his return to England in May 1654 he was arrested, with two others, on a charge of conspiring against the government in what became known as Gerard's conspiracy. It was alleged that in company with a Royalist major, one Henshaw, whom he had met in France, Gerard with 30 other mounted men were to attack the Lord Protector, Oliver Cromwell as he rode to Hampton Court, and, after overwhelming his body guard and killing him, to besiege Whitehall, seize the Tower of London, and proclaim Charles II king.

The trial began on 3 June before the High Court of Justice. Gerard declared that he had been to Paris on private business, and that Charles had desired his friends not to engage in plots. The reluctant evidence of his younger brother Charles, to whom he sent his forgiveness from the scaffold, pointed to treasonable conversations with Henshaw and the rest in taverns. Gerard and Peter Vowell (a schoolmaster), were sentenced to death. Gerard successfully petitioned to be beheaded instead of hanged. Gerard died with undaunted courage on 10 July 1654 at Tower Hill, the same day as Don Pantaleone Sá whose execution followed his.

While on the scaffold he was told he could not read his prepared speech. He turned to the crowd and told them he was not permitted to speak, and intimated his words would be published, and then continued with vehemence:

I die a faithful subject and servant to King Charles the second, whom I pray God to bless and restore to his rights; and had I ten thousand thousand lives I would gladly lay them all down thus for his service

— John Gerard.

The Royalist writers published a copy of his prepared speech, and affirmed that he fell into a trap set by Cromwell. This view was elaborately restated by Reginald Palgrave in the English Historical Review for October 1888, in the course of a controversy between that writer and C. H. Firth. However, no certain proof has been adduced of Cromwell's complicity.
