= Siege of Worcester (1643) =

Coordinates: 52°11′20″N 2°13′15″W

Siege of Worcester (May 1643)
- Part of the First English Civil War
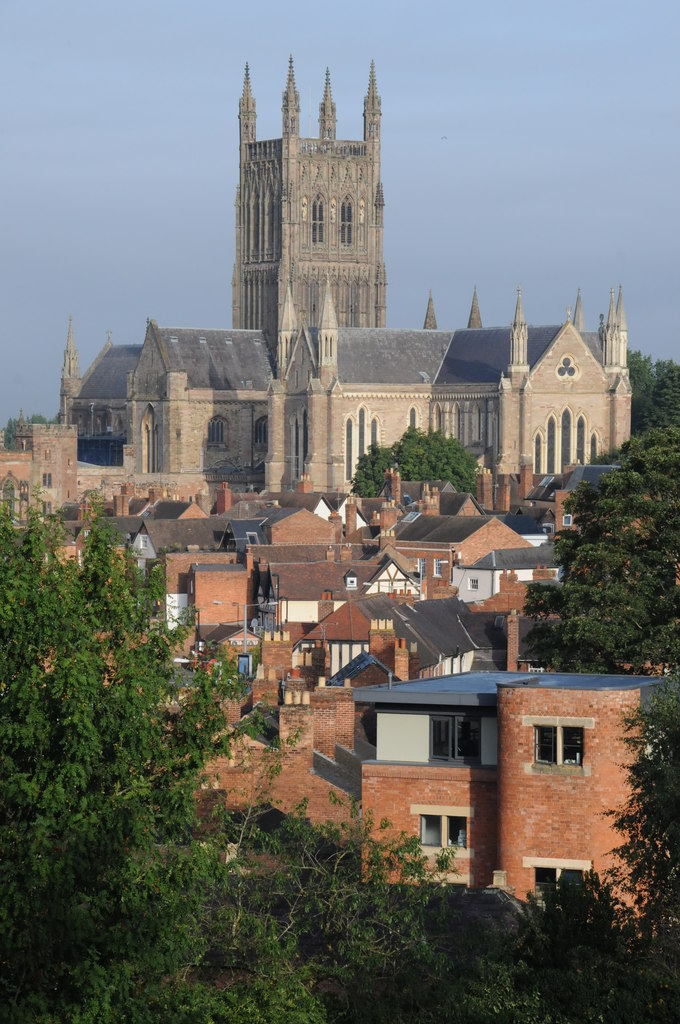
- Worcester Cathedral from Fort Royal Hill.
Date	29–31 May 1643
Location	Worcester
Result	Royalist victory

Belligerents
Royalists	Parliamentarians

Commanders and leaders
Colonel William Sandys	Sir William Waller

Strength
1,500 and 300 militia.	3,000 and 8 guns

Casualties and losses
Light	5–6 captains 160 soldiers were killed
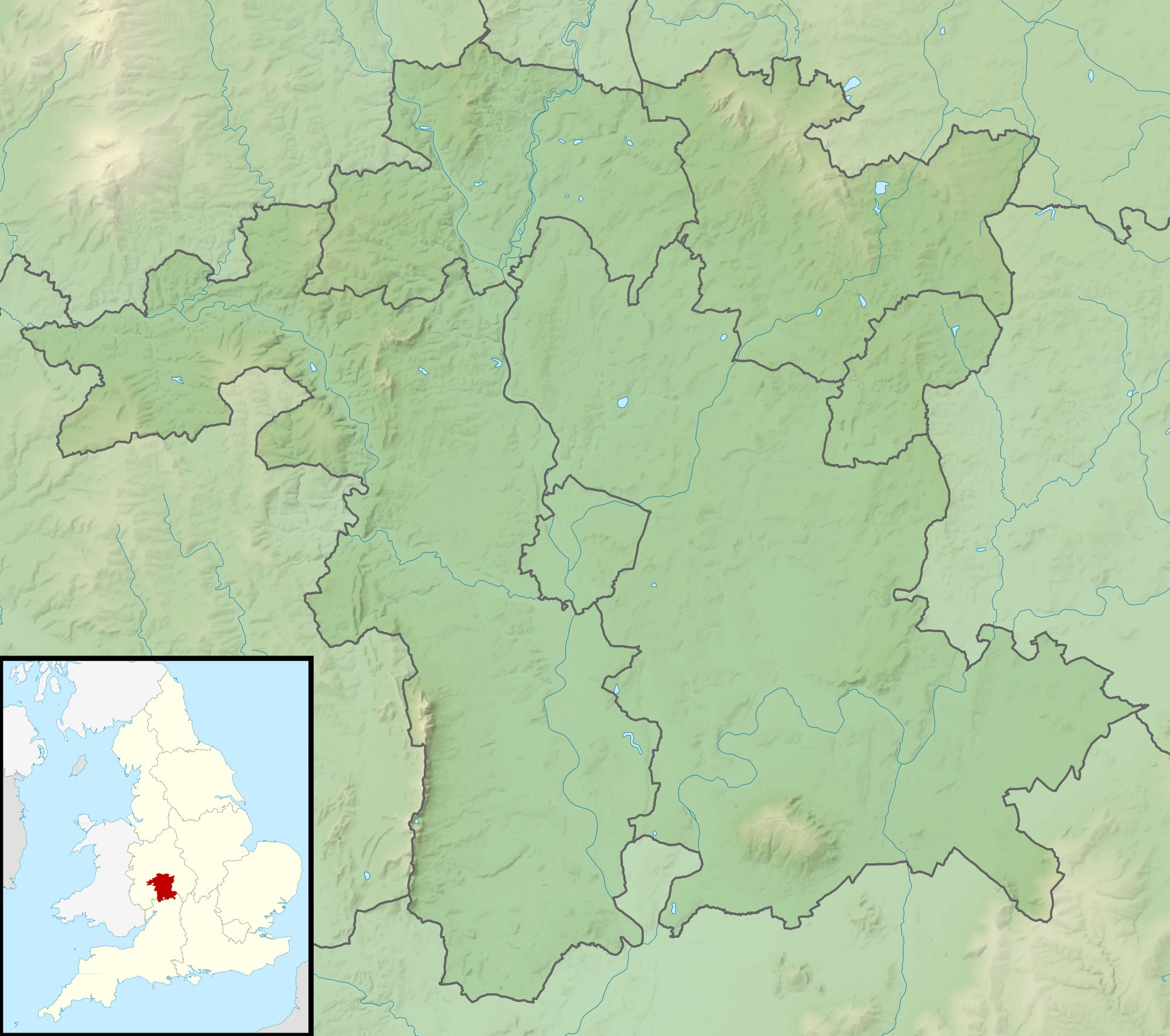
- Worcester within Worcestershire

The short siege of Worcester (29–31 May 1643) was conducted by a Parliamentary army of about 3,000 under the command of Sir William Waller. They failed to capture the city, which was defended by about 1,700 Royalists under the command of Colonel William Sandys the acting governor, and retreated back to the Parliamentary stronghold of Gloucester.

== Prelude ==
After the battle of Ripple Field (13 April 1643) and his defeat by Prince Maurice, Sir William Waller retreated to Tewkesbury, and on to Gloucester. When there he found orders to go to his headquarters which were located in Bristol. This he delayed to do, the historian J.W. Willis-Bund stated that Waller was probably thinking it was necessary to do something to maintain his reputation as there was no love lost between him and the Earl of Essex. His bad luck in the operations against Maurice rendered it necessary for him to achieve something really brilliant before he returned to Bristol. He accordingly did not obey his orders, stating it would not be safe for him to leave Gloucester until Hereford and Worcester were reduced. He, therefore, set to work to carry out this out.

From his spies Waller learnt it was possible, if a bold and sudden attack was made, that Hereford might be taken. Such work Waller loved, and he determined to try. With about 2,500 men he set out from Gloucester, and at daybreak on the 24 April appeared before Hereford. Some desultory fighting went on during the day, at times rather sharp, but the garrison had no heart in their resistance and deserted, so that there was nothing for Sir Richard Cave, the governor of Hereford, to do but to surrender. This he did, and on 25 April 1643. Waller entered Hereford in triumph. He was entitled to every credit that belongs to a bold and successful leader, and had more than restored his reputation as a conqueror. He had struck unexpectedly, and struck hard, with the result that he had dealt a blow where least expected, and one which was of considerable tactical importance, as he had severed the King's line of communication with Wales.

With the capture of Reading on the next day (26 April) the Parliamentarians were now masters of the Thames valley. Nothing remained to prevent them carrying out their original idea of a dash on Oxford, provided the Earl of Essex and Sir William Waller joined forces. To prevent them doing this was the task now set for Prince Rupert; this entailed his marching to the West of England.

Maurice, on his return to Oxford, had brought with him as a trophy of his triumph over Waller one of his colours, probably taken at Ripple. The Royalists boasted that Maurice had made Waller a negligible quantity by what he had done. Maurice returned in triumph on 7 April; not more than 14 days had elapsed and Waller had not only undone all that Maurice professed to have accomplished, but also upset the future plans of the Royalists. They were naturally furious. The Royalist governors of Hereford and Reading were each brought to a court-martial, but both were acquitted. Secretary Nicholas, writing to the Marquis of Ormond, says:

There hath lately been two very considerable towns rendered to the rebels here, as is strongly suspected by treachery, for we hear that since they cannot prevail against His Majesty's forces, they say they will make trial what they can do by corrupting some of our commanders.

Parliament made the most of their triumphs. Their feelings were expressed in lines which speak more for their joy than their poetry:

Reading yielded is,
Hereford taken is,
Hopton beaten is,
Malignants grieve I wis.

The third line refers to another Royalist disaster, the defeat of Sir Ralph Hopton, at the Battle of Sourton Down, by Major-General James Chudleigh, also on 25 April. Nor did they confine themselves to poetry. Their preachers ascribed their successes to the direct interposition of God. Waller's entry into Hereford was said to be "as great a deliverance as the Israelites passing the Red Sea". Essex taking Reading was "no less a miracle than the razing down the walls of Jericho with pitchers and rams' horns".

There was cause for their exultation. These were the first really important successes the Parliament had gained in the Midlands, and if they had been able to hold Hereford and reap the fruits of their victory the war would doubtless ended sooner. Their difficulty was to find men to garrison at both Gloucester and Hereford. Waller had a force with which to raid the County, but not a sufficient force with which to garrison it. All he could do was to send out forays from Hereford to secure such supplies and plunder as could be secured, and bring in all arms and money that could be brought in. For instance, a band went to Holme Lacy, Viscount Scudamore's place, near Hereford, and were paid £10 15s. to go back. The depredations were not confined to raids from Hereford. Waller's soldiers have referred to themselves as "saints", they were also thieves.

In an account book of a lady who then resided in Hereford are these entries:

April 24th, 1643, he came, and 15th, Wednesday, he entered the city.
Paid John Baddam for mending; the tiles over new new closet, which Sir Wiltiam Waller's soldiers brake down to shoot at Widermarsh Gate when besieged Heriford, 4d.
Paid Richard Winnye Smith for mending locks and keys at Heriford, which the plunderers broke, 16d.
Paid Maud Pritchett for a cheese when Sir William Waller was in Heriford, for his soldiers, that I kept, 18d.

Having got all he could, Waller saw it was useless to continue to hold Hereford, so resolved to return to Gloucester with his force, in order to carry out the remaining part of his plan and occupy Worcester. Probably his movements were hastened by the knowledge that the Royalists were making preparations to re-take Hereford. On 18 May Waller set out for Gloucester, and on 20 May Hereford was again occupied by the Royalists.

The fate of Hereford had put the Worcester garrison on the alert. The Governor of Worcester, Sir William Russell, had gone to Oxford, Colonel William Sandys was, acting as governor. Russell, as Sheriff, had called out the posse comitalus, all between 16 and 60, to come in and serve King Charles I, but it does not appear that the summons had been largely obeyed.

There was a good deal of insubordination among the Worcester garrison, and the supply of money and of provisions was far from regular. There was consequently much discontent. This had been kept alive by the fact that bands of Waller's raiders had come fairly near the town; they had been seen at Upton-upon-Severn, and probably at Powick, and some communication, was kept up between the discontented party in the city and the Parliament troops outside.

Essex had appointed various persons who were favourable to the Parliament to offices in the Corporation during the time he had held the town in October 1642. By a Royal warrant of the 15 March 1643, these persons had been removed and their places filled with Royalists. The removed men were still in Worcester, and did not regard the ruling power with favour. All this was told to Waller, and he was informed if he only appeared before the walls he would thereupon be joined by a strong party from within the city. Waller therefore determined to attack Worcester at once.

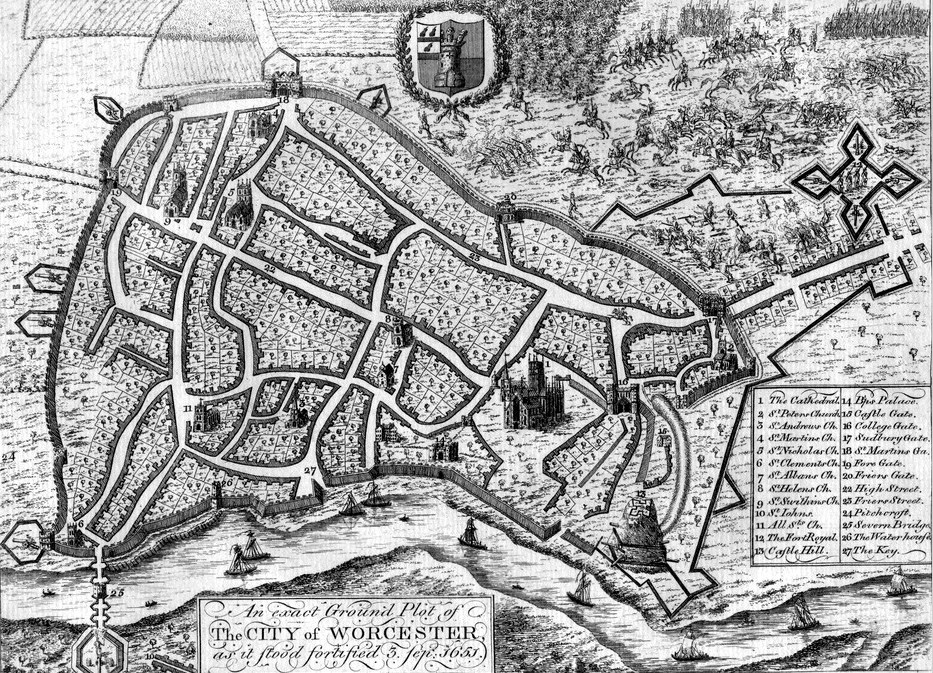
Worcester City defences (1651) showing civil war additions including the extensive works to the south and south-east (the map is aligned with east to the top) by Treadway Nash.

Worcester, in May 1643, was in a very different state from what it had been in September 1642 (see Worcester city walls). The walls had been rebuilt, the fortifications remade. Dud Dudley says, under his direction and supervision. Whether that was so or not, the place was now too strong to be carried without a regular siege.

A force of some 300 volunteers had been raised and trained from among the citizens. The garrison, about 1,500 strong, was in readiness, and expected to be attacked, for Waller's raiders had been noticed at Malvern and elsewhere, Sandys believed all was prepared for Waller whenever he liked to come, and that he could hold the city if it was attacked.

On the evening of 28 May handbills were scattered about the streets of Worcester:

To all gentlemen, and other inhabitants of the City of Worcester.

As many of you as are sensible of the danger of your religion, your persons and goods, and the privileges of your Corporation, are desired to declare yourselves sensible of them at this opportunity. It being my errand (by the help of God) to rescue them from the oppression of your present governors. And I promise that all such as shall appear willing to welcome my endeavour shall not only be received to free quarter, but protected to the utmost of my power.

May 29th, 1643. William Waller.

This invitation was cleverly worded, and was meant to appeal to all classes of the discontented. "Religion" referred to the lecturers who had been displaced for the parish clergy; "persons and goods" to the state of martial law and billeting that prevailed in a garrison town, to say nothing of the plundering of lawless ruffians like Colonel Hide; (Note: One case, which shows the state of things in the Worcester garrison in 1643 is the behaviour of officers like Colonel Hide who was in command of a regiment of foot. He had seen service abroad, and on the strength of such service considered he was entitled to treat all who had not some such experience with the most supreme contempt, and especially the governor (Sir William Russell) and his two chief officers, Sir James Hamilton and Sir Francis Worsley, both of whom were in command of dragoon regiments forming part of the garrison. The Mayor of Worcester (Henry Ford) in January 1643, gave a New Year's feast, to which he asked the governor and his officers, including Hide. On sitting down to dinner, Hide took up his napkin from the trencher, looked under it, and seeing nothing, observed, "Mr. Mayor, I expected a New Year's gift", and then began to abuse the mayor in no measured words for not paying his (Hide's) soldiers. On this being arranged. Hide proceeded to drink with the Mayoress, and a fresh quarrel broke out because the lady declined to drink as many beer glasses of wine as Hide asked her to take. On the mayor desiring to protect his wife's sobriety. Hide threw his trencher at him. Sir William Russell, on this, intervened, trying to make peace, but Hide became so very violent that Russell had to put him under arrest. Hide then left the room. On getting into the street he imagined that two women insulted him, so with his sword he cut one over the head and the other over the shoulder. One of the women went to the mayor to complain. Hide followed, beginning to abuse the city magistrates. To stop the disturbance, Russell ordered Hide to his quarters. With some difficulty Sir James Hamilton got Hide to his lodgings, where Hide became most violent, abusing Russell, and telling the soldiers he wondered they submitted to be ruled by such a coward as the governor, and declared his intention of at once shooting him. A guard was placed at Hide's door, confining him to his quarters, but he broke out through the guard, struck several officers, caused the alarm to be beaten, and nearly raised a serious disturbance. Russell sent a report of Hide's conduct to headquarters at Oxford. Hide was sent there under a guard, tried by court-martial, but discharged, as Russell did not appear against him.) "privileges of the Corporation" to the displacement of the members by the Royal warrant. Waller appealed to all the parties who were aggrieved, and he believed he should not appeal in vain. Naturally, Sandys considered this handbill was the prelude to an immediate attack, so the troops were mustered, the gates closed. He was right; with the morning came Waller.

== Siege ==
Leaving Gloucester on the afternoon of 28 May 1643, marching all night through Tewkesbury, Severn Stoke, and Kempsey, Waller reached Worcester about daybreak on the 29 May.

Waller had with him a considerable force, about 3,000 strong, and 8 guns. It comprised all his cavalry, including the celebrated Gloucester Blue Regiment. It was obvious that he had come in earnest to deliver the oppressed. On arriving on the south side of the town he halted his men on the high ground above Diglis, sent his trumpeter to the Sidbury Gate to demand the surrender of the place. Colonel Sandys told him, in answer to his demand, that "he was not at Hereford", and had better be off. The trumpeter replied, rightly, that such an answer was most uncivil, and not such as he would take back to his general, Sandys on this told him very peremptorily to be off, and having said so Sandys returned to his quarters.

The trumpeter would not leave, refusing to stir, basing his refusal on the fact that he was by the laws of war entitled to a civil answer to take back to his general. The sentry thereupon sent to Sandys asking for orders. Sandys returned not in the best of tempers, accompanied by one of his officers, Captain Beaumont, who commanded one of the regiments that formed the garrison. Sandys again asked the trumpeter why he did not go. The reply was short, decisive, and insulting. On this, Beaumont ordered the guard to fire at the trumpeter. One of them did so, hitting him in the thigh. He fell from his horse mortally wounded.

A great and heated controversy arose over this "regrettable incident", the Parliament writers and speakers contending with some truth that the Royalists had deliberately violated a flag of truce, and killed, while doing his duty, a messenger under its protection, an act opposed to the laws of war; an outrage on civilization. The Royalists contended that the trumpeter, having discharged his mission received his answer, and, refusing to leave when ordered, had by such refusal forfeited all the protection a flag of truce gave him, and might be, and ought to be, as he had been, shot down like a dog.

Whatever might be the rights or wrongs of the question, the death of his trumpeter was more than Waller could stand; it hastened his action. It was now about 06:00 Waller ordered the attack to be begun. Placing his guns in position they at once opened on the place. A long artillery duel followed. Some accounts say it lasted all day, some 16 hours (from 6:00 until 22:00); but this can hardly be so, having regard to the rest of the operations. Waller's guns were not able to suppress cannons of the city forts, still less to obtain the ascendant. One account says:

The city cannoneer in-chief, with his cannon from the city, together with the musketeers, all proved good firemen.

An assault on the east of the City towards Friary Gate was repulsed with heavy loss to the assailants. In front of Diglis (to the south of the city) Waller fared better. After some hard fighting he carried a house just outside the walls near the Castle Hill, belonging to Mr. William Berkeley. This afforded Waller cover, from which he could fire on the city with safety, "annoying it and likewise the Friary". Sandys determined to dislodge Waller from this post, and after some severe fighting succeeded, not only in doing so, but also in burning the house, so that it was no longer tenable by Waller's men.

A sortie was made from St. Martin's Gate (on the east of the city) against Waller's right flank by a party of the Royalist horse. They drove the Parliamentarians back on Waller's centre, near Greenhill, and cleared the east side of the city. The fighting was severe. Waller lost some 60 or 70 men. (Note: It was said that among them was Sir Robert Cooke, of Highnam, a strong Parliamentarian, who had married the widow of George Herbert, the poet, but as this Sir Robert Cooke wrote a letter to Speaker Lenthall after the fight, describing it for his information, it could not have been the same man.)

The result of this sortie, and the failure of his attack on the Diglis side, led Waller to consider his position. A report arrived urging the garrison to resist, as Lord Capel was on the way to their relief. This was untrue, but it was true that Maurice, wanting to show what he could do against Waller, had set out from Oxford with three regiments of horse to cut off Waller's retreat to Gloucester. With his troops discouraged by their defeat, encumbered with their wounded. Waller was in no position to resist an attack by Sandys on his front and by Maurice on his flank and rear, besides having the River Avon to cross in case of disaster. So Waller determined to retreat while he could.

To get rid of the encumbrance of his wounded Waller collected all the boats round Worcester, and placing his wounded, baggage, and guns on board, sent them by water to Gloucester. He searched round Worcester to get horses, and is said to have been careful to send out as far north as Ombersley to carry off all those belonging to Colonel Sandys, the Governor of Worcester, and Martin Sandys, who was helping him. Having collected all he could, about 01:00 on the morning of 31 May Waller began his retreat towards Tewkesbury.

His loss in this attack on Worcester was heavy; five or six captains and 160 soldiers were killed; the wounded filled several barges, but the fighting had been sharp, sharper than usual, especially round Diglis, and this accounts for the casualties.

Sir Robert Cooke, on his return to Gloucester, sent the Speaker a fair account of Waller's defeat. He had been disappointed that there was no help from Worcester itself or from outside; Walter evidently feared an attack, or he would not have retired so quickly, or evacuated Tewkesbury so hastily.

The Worcester garrison stated, obviously untruthfully, that their loss was only two men and three women. The gunners were said to have used eleven barrels of powder and 200 great shot.

== Aftermath ==
The great point in the defence was the conduct of the Worcester women. All accounts say that they worked hard at the defences to relieve the soldiers. Nor did their labours end with the day's fighting. Waller had been able to make his attack with much greater effect from the cover and shelter he obtained against the fire from the walls by the trees, hedges, mounds, and fences outside the city walls, especially round Diglis, and also by the houses. It was decided that all the fences and mounds should be levelled, and also all houses and buildings situated like Mr. Berkeley's houses near the walls, which could be used by the enemy, removed. This it was decided should be done at once, in case Waller might return so women, out of every ward of the city, freely formed companies and levelled all the fortifications that were left behind by the Parliamentarians

The Worcester women need not have feared, Waller would not return; he was in no state to do so. As Cooke's letter shows, his position was far more serious than the Parliamentarians were willing to admit. Excuses were made for him. It was said that his zeal and his successes had made him attack a fortified city with an improper, insufficient, inadequate force. The Lord General the Earl of Essex, who had long been jealous of Waller's popularity and reputation, censure him severely. Waller had no answer to make; for as the historian Willis-Bund states he had blundered, and blundered badly.

To Worcester is due the honour of having checked the victorious career of the most popular, and hitherto the most successful, of the Parliamentary generals. Six weeks later, he was to receive at the Battle of Roundway Down (13 July 1643) a crushing blow that ruined his reputation as a general. Truly Waller said "Worcestershire was not a lucky place for him".
