= Battle of Tipton Green =

Part of the First English Civil War (1644)

Coordinates: 52.525357°N 2.067176°W

- Part of the First English Civil War
Date	12 June 1644
Location	Tipton Green, West Midlands
Result	Indecisive

Belligerents
Royalists	Parliamentarians

Commanders and leaders
Viscount Wilmot	Earl of Denbigh

Strength
c. 2,500	c. 1,750
- West Midlands and Tipton Green

The Battle of Tipton Green was an indecisive engagement fought during the First English Civil War in the area of Tipton Green, about one mile from Dudley Castle on 12 June 1644. The battle occurred when Royalist troops arrived from Worcester to break the Earl of Denbigh's siege of the castle. The battle itself was indecisive, as both sides withdrew from conflict. This granted the Royalists a tactical victory, as they forced the Parliamentarians to lift the siege.

== Background ==
In June 1644, the First English Civil War had been running for 22 months, since King Charles I had raised his banner in Nottingham and declared the Earl of Essex, and by extension Parliament, traitors. That action had been the culmination of religious, fiscal and legislative tensions going back over fifty years.

== Prelude ==
In early June, a Parliamentarian force comprising 1,000 infantry and 750 cavalry, under the command of the Earl of Denbigh, besieged Dudley Castle, a Royalist garrison. Charles I sent Viscount Wilmot with a 2,500 cavalry to relieve the castle. When Denbigh found out that Royalist forces were approaching, he split off a small detachment to meet them. After an inconclusive skirmish, Wilmot broke off and his force stopped overnight. During the night, Denbigh lifted the siege. He was delayed by a problem with removing his cannons, especially the largest of them. Rather than abandon the guns, Denbigh stubbornly continued to extract them, saying "I had rather lose ten lives than one piece of my artillery." By the time he extracted the last gun, it was morning, and Wilmot was near.

== Battle ==
Denbigh was still within one mile (1.6 km) of the castle when he positioned his force to face Wilmot at Tipton Green. Wilmot received support from the castle's garrison, and on receiving additional musketeers, he advanced on the Parliamentarians. The Royalists managed to place some musketeers inside Tipton Green House, while another group, comprising 300 of the cavalry and some musketeers charged the Parliamentarians. They followed this up with another attack, which routed Denbigh's cavalry, but the Parliamentarians had held enough forces back to counter-attack, forcing the Royalists to break off their attack. A detachment of the Parliamentarian infantry led by Colonel Simon Rugeley drove the Royalist musketeers out of the house.

Disengaged, both sides were reluctant to continue the fight, and both withdrew; Wilmot returning to the King in Worcester and Denbigh to Walsall.

== Aftermath ==
Both commanders claimed victory in the battle, though it was indecisive. Tactically, the Royalists had the better justification for the claim, having forced Denbigh to lift his siege of Dudley Castle. The battle is commemorated by a plaque on Malthouse Stables, a building that occupies part of the area on which the battle occurred.
