= Gerard's conspiracy =

Attempted assassination of Oliver Cromwell

In what has become known as Gerard's conspiracy, a group of Royalists conspired to assassinate England's Lord Protector Oliver Cromwell in May 1654. It was discovered before an assassination attempt could be made and the Protectorate arrested about forty men. Three were tried for high treason. A ring-leader, John Gerard, was found guilty and executed, as was Peter Vowell. Somerset Fox pleaded guilty and was sentenced to transportation. The view of the Royalists and their sympathisers was that the conspirators had fallen into a trap set by Cromwell.

== History ==
Early in 1654 John Gerard went over to France, where he was presented to Charles II by his cousin, Charles Gerard, Lord Brandon. Soon after his return to England in May 1654, a scheme to assassinate the Lord Protector Oliver Cromwell on his way to Hampton Court was discovered. About forty people, among whom were Aubrey, Earl of Oxford, the two Ashburnhams (John and William), Sir Richard Willis, John Gerard and his elder brother Sir Gilbert, were arrested.

It was alleged that in company with a Royalist major, one Henshaw (whom Gerard had met in France), Gerard with 30 other mounted men were to attack the Lord Protector, as he rode to Hampton Court, and, after overwhelming his bodyguard and killing him, to besiege Whitehall, seize the Tower of London, and proclaim Charles II king.

== Trial and punishment ==
Only three men, John Gerard, Peter Vowell (a schoolmaster) and Somerset Fox were brought to trial before the High Court of Justice.

The trial began on 3 June. Fox pleaded guilty (and was sentenced to transportation to Barbados). The other two were convicted on the evidence of ten of their accomplices, one of whom was Gerard's brother Charles, a youth of nineteen, he himself being but twenty-two. Gerard declared that he had been to Paris on private business, and that Charles II had desired his friends not to engage in plots. The reluctant evidence of his younger brother Charles, to whom he sent his forgiveness from the scaffold, pointed to treasonable conversations with Henshaw and the rest in taverns.

Gerard and Vowell were sentenced to death by hanging. Vowell was hanged, but Gerard successfully petitioned to be beheaded instead. Gerard died with undaunted courage on 10 July 1654 at Tower Hill, avowing his Royalism, but denying all participation in the conspiracy.

The Royalist writers published a copy of his prepared speech, and affirmed that he fell into a trap set by Cromwell. This view has been elaborately restated by Reginald Palgrave in the English Historical Review for October 1888, in the course of a controversy between that writer and C. H. Firth. However, no certain proof has been adduced of Cromwell's complicity.
