= Governor of Worcester =

Governors of the city of Worcester, England, include:

== Civil War ==
List of governors of Worcester during the English Civil War
Name	Details
Sir John Byron	Commander of a Royalist military garrison for part of September 1642.
Robert Devereux, 3rd Earl of Essex	Commander-in-chief of the Parliamentary army, occupied the city on 24 September 1642 and remained there for about a month before marching off to the Battle of Edgehill (23 October 1642).
Colonel Thomas Essex	October–November 1642. — Parliamentarian governor appointed by Parliament.
Sir William Russell	1642–1643. — Royalist governor
Colonel Gilbert Gerard	December 1643 – beginning of 1646. (Note: The historian J.W. Willis-Bund gives contradictory information as to when Gerard ceased to be Governor of Worcester. On page 29 Willis-Bund writes that Gerard was governor until his death in 1645. On page 143 he states that at the beginning of 1645 Samuel Sandys became governor, but on page 173, he reports that Sir Gilbert Gerard led another party to Stourbridge and Kidderminster which J.M. Gratton places at the end of 1645. If one assumes that Willis-Bund misreported an Old Style January date in a primary source (he does not cite his source), and Sandys became governor in January 1646 (Rather than January 1645), then it does not contradict the information provided by J.M. Gratton (that the party Gerard led was in Kidderminster in late 1645) or R. Lomas, that Gerard was still the governor on 22 December 1645 (Lomas cites the contemporary diary of Elias Asmole).) — Royalist governor
Colonel Samuel Sandys	Beginning of 1646. (Note: Sandys was appointed Lieutenant-Governor of Worcester in 1644 (Rowlands 1983 cites W. H. Black, Docquets of Letters Patent, 281).) — Royalist governor (having been acting governor during the Siege of Worcester (1643))
Jacob Astley, 1st Baron Astley of Reading	Royalist governor who had succeeded colonel Samuel Sandys, was taken prisoner and confined at Warwick.
Sir Henry Washington	Royalist governor during the Siege of Worcester (1646) at the end of the First Civil War
Major-General Edward Massey	Parliamentarian governor
