= Timothy Littleton =

English politician and judge (1608–1679)

Sir Timothy Littleton ( c 1608 – 2 April 1679 ) was an English judge and politician who sat in the House of Commons between 1660 and 1670.

Littleton was the son of Sir Edward Littleton of Henley Shropshire and his wife Mary Walter, daughter of Edward Walter of Ludlow. His father was chief justice of North Wales. Littleton became a lawyer and was serjeant-at-law.

In 1660, Littleton was elected member of parliament for Ludlow in the Convention Parliament. He was re-elected MP for Ludlow in 1661 in the Cavalier Parliament and sat until 1670 when he became Baron of the Exchequer.

After the Great Fire of London in 1666, Littleton was a judge at the Fire Court set up under the Fire of London Disputes Act 1666 to hear cases relating to property destroyed in the fire. The artist John Michael Wright was commissioned to paint portraits of all 22 judges that had sat in the Fire Court. He was knighted at Whitehall on 29 June 1671.

Littleton died at the age of 70 and was buried in Temple Church.
