= Sir Francis Charlton, 2nd Baronet =

English politician

Sir Francis Charlton, 2nd Baronet (1651–1729), of Whitton Court, Shropshire, was an English politician.

He was a member (MP) of the parliament of England for Ludlow in March 1679, October 1679 and 1681, and for Bishop's Castle in 1685.

Baronetage of England
Preceded by Job Charlton	Baronet (of Ludford); 1697–1729	Succeeded by Blunden Charlton
