= Broadway meeting =

An unauthorised meeting was held at Broadway in Worcestershire in January 1648, by about 80 officers from four or five Parliamentary regiments. They met to discuss grievances, principally the issue of back pay.

One report in a letter read out in Parliament on 24 January 1648, suggested that up to 60 of the officers present were plotting a military uprising. However no uprising took place, whether that was because the Derby House Committee took actions that pre-empted the insurrection or if there was no substance to the report is not known.
