= Basil Feilding, 2nd Earl of Denbigh =

English diplomat and politician (1608–1675)

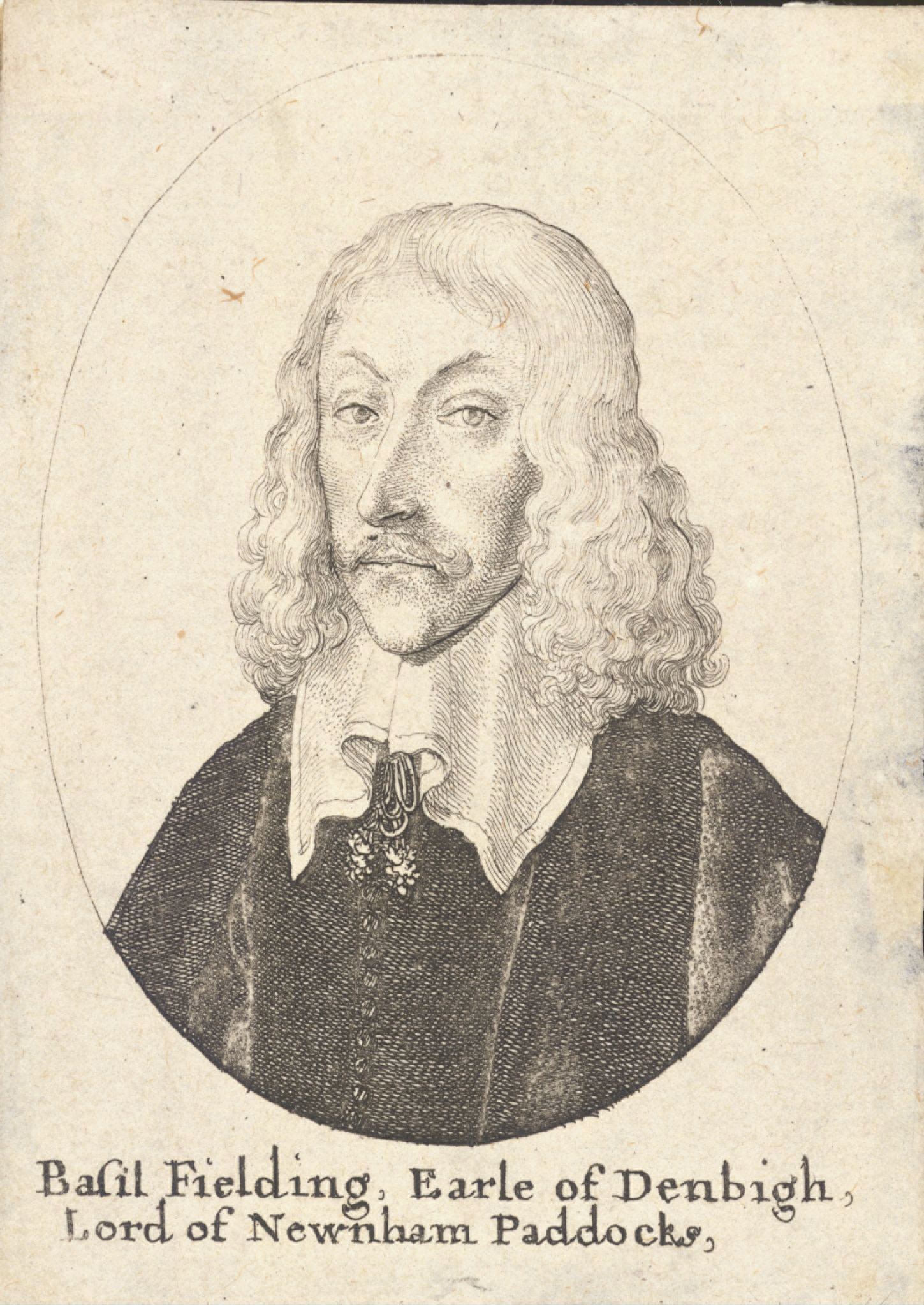
The 2nd Earl of Denbigh.

Basil Feilding, 2nd Earl of Denbigh (c. 1608 – 28 November 1675) was an English diplomat, politician and parliamentarian army officer during the English Civil War.

== Biography ==
The eldest son of William Feilding, 1st Earl of Denbigh and Lady Susan Villiers, Basil Feilding was educated at Queens' College, Cambridge, where he graduated MA (fil. nob.) in 1622. He was summoned to the House of Lords as Baron Fielding in March 1629. Around this time, his maternal grandmother, the Countess of Buckingham, gifted or bequeathed Basil substantial lands adjacent to the family estate at Newnham Paddox, Warwickshire. Consisting of most of the village of Monks Kirby and land in neighbouring villages, the lands were the ancient estate that had belonged to the Pre-Reformation Monks Kirby Priory. He then pursued further study in Switzerland, attending Basel University in 1631.

After military service in the Netherlands, which saw him present at the siege of Bois-Le-Duc, Feilding was sent in 1634 by Charles I as ambassador to Venice, where he remained for five years.

When the English Civil War broke out, Fielding, unlike the other members of his family, ranged himself among the Parliamentarians and led a regiment of horse at the Battle of Edgehill. His father, the first Earl, was on the other side that day and suffered injuries from which he died. Having become Earl of Denbigh in April 1643, Basil was made commander-in-chief of the Parliamentary army in Warwickshire and the neighbouring counties, and Lord Lieutenant of Warwickshire.

During the year 1644, he was fairly active in the field, but in some quarters, he was distrusted and he resigned his command after the passing of the Self-denying Ordinance in April 1645. At the Treaty of Uxbridge in 1645, Denbigh was one of the commissioners appointed to treat with the king, and he undertook a similar duty at Carisbrooke in 1647. Clarendon relates how at Uxbridge, Denbigh declared privately that he regretted the position in which he found himself, and expressed his willingness to serve Charles I. He supported the New Model Army in its dispute with Long Parliament, but he would take no part in the regicide of Charles I.

Under the government of the Commonwealth, Denbigh was a member of the Council of State, but his loyalty to his former associates grew indifferent, and gradually he came to be regarded as a royalist. In 1664, following the Restoration, the earl was created Baron St Liz by Charles II. Although four times married, he left no issue when he died in 1675.

His titles devolved on his nephew William Feilding, 3rd Earl of Denbigh and second Earl of Desmond (1640–1685), son and heir of his brother George (created Baron Fielding of Lecaghe, Viscount Callan and Earl of Desmond), and the earldom of Desmond has been held by his descendants in conjunction with the earldom of Denbigh.

== See also ==
- Tinker Fox
- Battle of Tipton Green

== Notes ==
Honorary titles
Preceded by Interregnum	Custos Rotulorum of Warwickshire; 1660–1675	Succeeded by The Viscount Conway
Preceded by The Lord Loughborough	Custos Rotulorum of Leicestershire; 1667–1675	Succeeded by The Earl of Huntingdon
Peerage of England
Preceded by William Feilding	Earl of Denbigh; 1643–1675	Succeeded by William Feilding
