= Charles Gerard, 1st Earl of Macclesfield =

English aristocrat, soldier and courtier

The Right Honourable The Earl of Macclesfield PC
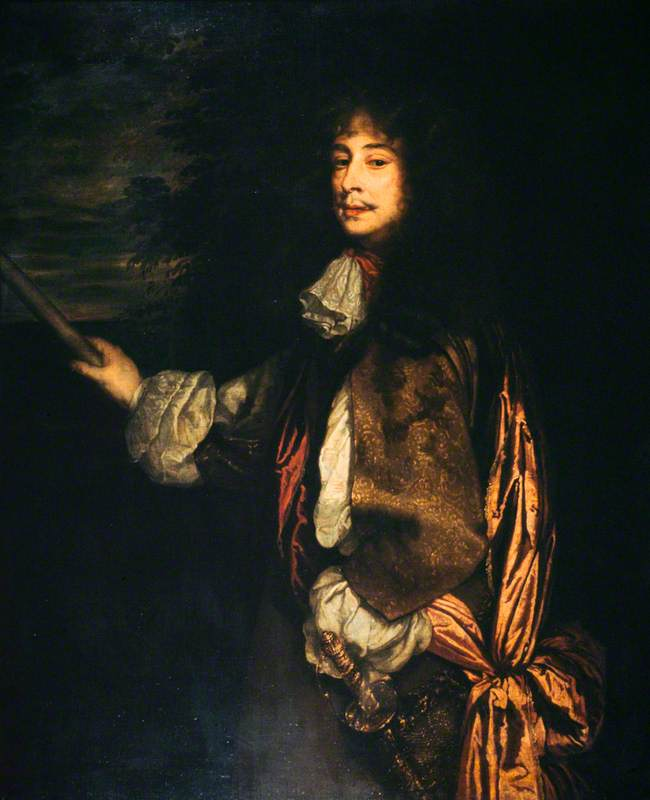

Lord President of Wales
- In office 1689–1689
- Monarch: William III
- Preceded by: The Duke of Beaufort
- Succeeded by: Office abolished

Personal details
- Born: 1618
- Died: 7 January 1694 (aged 75–76)
- Resting place: Westminster Abbey
- Spouse: Jane de Civelle
- Education: Leiden University

Military service
- Allegiance: Royalist
- Battles/wars: English Civil War

Charles Gerard, 1st Earl of Macclesfield, PC (c. 1618 – 7 January 1694) was an English aristocrat, soldier and courtier. He fought as a Royalist during the English Civil War, before spending a period in exile under the Commonwealth. After returning to England upon the Stuart Restoration in 1660, he was made Earl of Macclesfield by Charles II in 1679. He later fell out of royal favour and was declared an outlaw, but after a second period on the continent, he returned to England in 1688 in the retinue of William of Orange. He received several offices under the crown, including serving as the last Lord President of Wales in 1689.

== Early life ==
The eldest son of Sir Charles Gerard, he was a member of an old Lancashire family, his great-grandfather having been Sir Gilbert Gerard (died 1593) of Ince, in that county, one of the most distinguished judges in the reign of Elizabeth I. His mother was Penelope Fitton, sister and co-heiress of Sir Edward Fitton, of Gawsworth, Cheshire.

Nothing is known about Gerard's education until he entered Leyden University on 23 March 1633. He was also educated in France under John Goffe of Magdalen College, Oxford, brother of Stephen Goffe. Dugdale states that he was "trained in the discipline of war from his youth in the United Provinces", and that on the outbreak of the First English Civil War he joined the King at Shrewsbury, and raised a troop of horse at his own charge.

== Early Civil War battles and sieges ==
At the Battle of Edgehill, Gerard commanded a brigade of Royalist foot guards, the steadiness of which largely contributed to averting absolute defeat. In this battle, as also in the operations before Lichfield in April 1643, he was wounded. He was present at the siege of Bristol (July 1643), and arranged the very rigorous terms of the capitulation. He fought with distinction in the First Battle of Newbury (20 September 1643), and took part in the relief of Newark (March 1644), when he was again wounded, thrown from his horse, and taken prisoner, but released on parole shortly before the besiegers capitulated.

== Welsh campaigns ==
Shortly afterwards Gerard was appointed in succession to the Earl of Carbery in the general command in South Wales, then strongly held by Parliamentary forces, and by 19 May 1644 had succeeded in collecting a force of two thousand five hundred horse and foot with which to begin operations. He marched by Chepstow to Cardiff, which surrendered to him, and took Kidwelly. By 12 June he had already penetrated into Carmarthenshire, and before the 18th he was in possession of Carmarthen. He rapidly reduced Cardigan, Newcastle Emlyn, Laugharne, and Roch castles, and seems to have experienced no check until he was already threatening Pembroke about the middle of July, when the garrison of that place by a sortie routed a portion of his force and obtained supplies. On 22 August he took Haverfordwest, and before the end of the month had invested Pembroke and was threatening Tenby. His forces are said to have been largely composed of Irish levies, of whose barbarous atrocities loud complaint is made in the Kingdom's Intelligencer (15–23 October 1644).

In September Gerard received orders to join Prince Rupert at Bristol, and in October he began his retreat, marching by Usk and Abergavenny, and thus evading General Edward Massey he reached Bristol towards the end of the month. November he spent in Oxford or the neighbourhood, whence in December he transferred his headquarters to Worcester, where he remained until 11 March 1645, when he marched to Cheshire to co-operate with Rupert, Maurice, and Sir Marmaduke Langdale against General Sir William Brereton. Their combined forces succeeded in relieving Beeston Castle on 17 March.

Gerard was then ordered back to South Wales, where the Parliamentary General Rowland Laugharne had gained some successes. He marched through Wales from Chester in a south-westerly direction, carrying all before him and ravaging the country as he went. After a brush with Sir John Price at Llanidloes, he fell in with Laugharne before Newcastle Emlyn on 16 May, and completely defeated him. Haverfordwest and Cardigan Castle, which had been recovered by the Roundheads, were evacuated on his approach. Picton Castle offered a stout resistance, but was carried by assault. Carew Castle also fell into his hands. Pembroke and Tenby, closely invested, alone held out.

== With King Charles after Naseby ==
The ascendency of the royalists being thus re-established in South Wales, Gerard received orders to move eastward again, and was marching on Hereford at the head of five thousand horse and foot when the Battle of Naseby was fought (14 June 1645). After the battle, King Charles and Rupert, with the fragments of their army, fell back upon Hereford in the hope of effecting a junction with Gerard, who, however, seems to have been unexpectedly delayed; and Rupert, pushing on to Bristol, sent orders that part of Gerard's forces should join him there, while the King required a portion of the cavalry to attend his person. From Hereford Charles retreated to Abergavenny and thence to Cardiff, with the hope of raising a fresh army in Wales, but found the Welsh much disaffected, owing (according to Clarendon) to the irritation engendered by the extraordinary rigour with which Gerard had treated them; so that when news came that Hereford had been invested by the Scottish army and must fall unless relieved within a month, Charles could only induce the Welsh to move by superseding Gerard, promising at the same time to make him a baron. Gerard chose the territorial designation of Brandon, for no better reason, asserts Clarendon, than "that there was once an eminent person called Charles Brandon who was afterwards made a duke".

Gerard had become Lieutenant-General of all the King's Horse, and assumed the command of his bodyguard. On the night of 4 August 1645, he escorted Charles from Cardiff to Brecknock, and thence to Ludlow, and throughout his progress to Oxford (28 August). Thence they returned to Hereford (4 September), the Scots raising the siege on their approach. At Hereford, on 14 September Charles heard of the fall of Bristol, and determined if possible to join Montrose in the north. Escorted by Gerard, he made for Chester, and succeeded in entering the city, having first detached Gerard to the assistance of Sir Marmaduke Langdale, who was endeavouring to muster the royalists in force outside the city, with the view of raising the siege. After much apparently purposeless marching and counter-marching, the royalists risked an engagement with the besiegers on Rowton Heath (23 September 1645), but were totally defeated by General Sydnam Poyntz. Gerard was carried from the field desperately wounded. The King then evacuated Chester and retired to Newark, where he arrived with Gerard on 4 October, and fixed his headquarters for the winter. Gerard was dismissed from the King's service before the end of the month for taking part with Rupert and some other Cavaliers in a disorderly protest against the supersession of Sir Richard Willis, the governor of the place.

== With Prince Rupert and exile ==
Gerard now attached himself closely to Rupert's party, which consisted of about four hundred officers. They established themselves at Worton House, some fourteen miles from Newark-on-Trent, and made overtures to Parliament with the view of obtaining passes out of the country. Parliament, however, required that they should take an oath never again to bear arms against it. The Cavaliers, therefore, temporised, being really anxious for a reconciliation with the King on honourable terms. They were ordered to the neighbourhood of Worcester by Parliament, and there remained during the winter, but early in the following year (1646) returned to their allegiance and the King at Oxford. There Gerard raised another troop of horse, with which he scoured the adjoining country, penetrating on one occasion as far as the neighbourhood of Derby, where he was routed in a skirmish. At one time he seems to have been in command of Wallingford Castle, but when the lines of investment began to be drawn more closely round Oxford he withdrew within the city walls, where he seems to have remained until the surrender of the city on 24 June 1646). He probably left England with Rupert, as he was at the Hague on 27 December 1646.

== Early exile ==
Form late 1646 until the Restoration Gerard's movements are very hard to trace. He was at St. Germain-en-Laye in September 1647 with Rupert, Digby, and other Cavaliers. He was appointed vice-admiral of the fleet in November 1648, and on 8 December passed through Rotterdam on his way to Helvoetsluys to enter his new duties. In April 1649 he was at the Hague as Gentleman of the Bedchamber to the King Charles II. He apparently belonged to the "queen's faction", which was understood to favour the policy of coming to an understanding with the commissioners from the Scottish Parliament, who were then at the Hague, but were denied an audience by Charles. In October of the same year he was with Charles in Jersey when the celebrated declaration addressed to the English people was published, and he was a member, and probably an influential member, of the council which advised the King to treat with the Scottish Parliament as a "committee of estates". He returned with the King to the Hague, where this policy was put in execution.

On 18 March 1650 Hyde wrote from Madrid to Secretary Nicholas praising Gerard somewhat faintly as a "gallant young man" who "always wants a friend by him"; to which Nicholas replied on 4 May that Gerard is "the gallantest, honestest person now about the King, and the most constant to honourable principles". In the following November (1650) Nicholas writes to Gerard that he has the commission appointing him general of Kent, but that the fact must be kept secret "because the King in his late declaration promised the Scots to grant none." In March 1650–1 Gerard left the Hague for Breda in attendance on the Duke of York, who was anxious to avoid certain "things called ambassadors," as Nicholas scornfully terms the Scottish envoys. In the following November, he was in Paris, where he seems to have remained for at least a year.

On 13 May 1652, Gerard was appointed to the command of the corps of lifeguards then being raised. In 1653 he went to Utrecht, where Dr. Robert Creighton "wrought a miracle" upon him. He remained there through part of 1654, was present at the siege of Arras, serving under Marshal Turenne as a volunteer in August of that year, and then returned to Paris, where he divided his energies between quarrelling with Hyde, intriguing on behalf of Queen Henrietta Maria, and instigating his cousin, John Gerard, to assassinate the Protector. The plot (Gerard's conspiracy), to which the King appears to have been privy (Gerard had presented his cousin to the King early in 1654), was discovered, and John Gerard was beheaded on Tower Hill.

== Exile and return ==
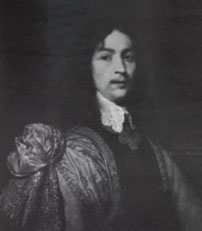
The 1st Earl of Macclesfield. By William Dobson in the Dunedin Public Art Gallery

A letter from one F. Coniers to the King, dated London, 11 January 1655, accuses Gerard of having treated with Thurloe for the poisoning of Oliver Cromwell. This the writer professes to have discovered by glancing over some papers incautiously exposed in Thurloe's chambers. "The story is obviously a mere invention" (Rigg 1890). In July 1655 Gerard was at Cologne, closely watched by Thurloe's spies. As Hyde wrote to Nicholas from Paris, 24 April 1654, Gerard was never without projects. From Cologne he went to Antwerp "to attempt the new modelling of the plot", returning to Paris in September. There he appears to have resided until May 1656, busily employed in collecting intelligence. In this work he seems to have been much aided by the postal authorities, who, according to one of Thurloe's correspondents, allowed him to intercept whatever letters he pleased. In July he was at Cologne awaiting instructions. In February 1657 he was at the Hague, corresponding under the name of Thomas Enwood with one Dermot, a merchant at the sign of the Drum, Drury Lane. The only fragment of this correspondence which remains is unintelligible, being couched in mercantile phraseology, which gives no clue to its real meaning.

From the Hague, Gerard went to Brussels, where in April he received instructions to raise a troop of horse guards at once and a promise of an allowance of four hundred guilders a day for his family. From Brussels, he returned to Paris in March 1658. He was almost immediately despatched to Amsterdam, apparently for the purpose of chartering ships, and he spent the rest of that year and the first six months of the next partly in the Low Countries and partly at Boulogne, returning to Paris between August and September 1659. There he appears to have spent the latter part of the year, joining Secretary Nicholas at Brussels in the following January.

From Brussels, in the spring of 1660 Gerard went to Breda (where the King held his court), and in May returned with the King to England. On 17 May 1660, he was commissioned Captain in the Life Guards. He rode at their head in the King's progress to Whitehall on 29 May 1660.

== Restoration ==
Restoration of Lord Gerrard Act 1660
- Act of Parliament
- Parliament of England
- Long title: An Act for restoring to Charles Lord Gerard, Baron of Brandon, all his Honours, Manors, Lands, Tenements, and Hereditaments, whereof he was in Possession on the 20th Day of May, 1642, or at any Time sithence.
- Citation: 12 Cha. 2. c. 8 Pr.
- Territorial extent: England and Wales

Dates
- Royal assent: 13 September 1660
- Commencement: 25 April 1660 (Note: Start of session.)

Status: Current legislation

On 29 July 1660, Gerard received a grant in reversion of the office of Remembrancer of the Tenths and First-Fruits. On 13 September his estates, which had been forfeited by Parliament, were restored to him.

On 15 May 1661, Gerard petitioned for the post of ranger of Enfield Chase, which he obtained. His title, however, was disputed by the late ranger, James Cecil, Earl of Salisbury, and he was soon involved in litigation with Captains Thomas and Henry Batt, keepers of Potter's Walk and bailiffs of the Chase, whose patents he refused to recognise. Both matters were referred to the lord chancellor for decision. As against the Batts, Gerard succeeded on the technical ground that their patent was under the great seal, whereas by statute it should have been under that of the duchy of Lancaster. It does not appear how the question with the Earl of Salisbury was settled.

In 1662 Gerard was granted a pension charged on the customs. Towards the end of the year, he was sent as envoy extraordinary to the French court, where he was very splendidly received. About this time he became a member of the Royal African Company, which obtained in January 1663 a grant by letters patent of the region between Port Sallee and the Cape of Good Hope for the term of one thousand years. Litigation in which he was this year engaged with his cousin, Alexander Fitton, afterwards Lord Chancellor of Ireland, was watched with much interest by his enemies. The dispute was about the title to the Gawsworth estate in Cheshire, of which Fitton was in possession, but which Gerard claimed. The title depended on the authenticity of a certain deed which Gerard alleged to be a forgery, producing the notorious forger Alexander Granger, who swore that he himself had forged it. Gerard obtained a verdict at the Chester assizes and ejected Fitton. Fitton, however, published a pamphlet in which he charged Gerard with having procured Granger's evidence by intimidation. Gerard moved the House of Lords on the subject, and the pamphlet was suppressed. Fitton was imprisoned for scandalum magnatum, the offence of libelling a peer: he remained in prison for almost 20 years.

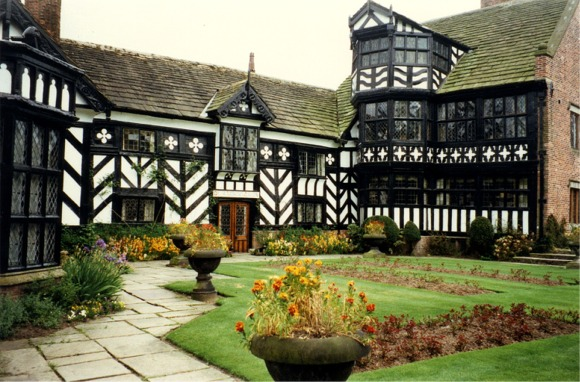
Gawsworth Old Hall

In March 1665 Gerard was granted a pension of £1,000 per annum to retire from the post of captain of the guard, which Charles desired to confer on the Duke of Monmouth. His retirement, however, did not take place until 1668, when Samuel Pepys says that he received £12,000 for it. Pepys also states that it was his practice to conceal the deaths of the troopers that he might draw their pay; and one of his clerks named Carr drew up a petition to the House of Lords charging him with peculation to the extent of £2,000 per annum. The petition found its way into print before presentation, and was treated by the house as a breach of privilege, voted a "scandalous paper", and ordered to be burned by the common hangman. Carr was sentenced to pay a fine of £1,000, to stand in the pillory for three hours on each of three different days, and to be imprisoned in the Fleet during the king's pleasure. Gerard subsequently indicted him as a deserter from the army.

== Post Restoration ==
On 5 January 1667, Gerard had been appointed to the general command of the Hampshire and Isle of Wight militia, with special instructions to provide for the security of the Isle of Wight and Portsmouth in view of the threatening attitude of the Dutch. In this capacity, he was busily engaged during the spring and summer of 1667 in strengthening the fortifications of Portsmouth. He continued to hold the post of Gentleman of the Bedchamber, with a pension of £1,000 attached to it, during the reign of Charles II.

On 23 July 1679, he was created Earl of Macclesfield. On the occasion of the Duke of Monmouth's unauthorised return from abroad in November 1679, Gerard was sent by Charles to him "to tell him out of his great tenderness he gave him till night to be gone". The messenger was ill-chosen, Gerard being himself one of the band of conspirators of which Monmouth was the tool. His name appears in the Journal of the House of Lords, with that of the Earl of Shaftesbury, as one of the protesters against the rejection of the Exclusion Bill on 15 November 1680. Lord Grey de Werke in his Confession (p. 61) asserts that Gerard suggested to Monmouth the expediency of murdering the Duke of York by way of terrorising Charles. In August 1681 Gerard was dismissed from the post of Gentleman of the Bedchamber. On 5 September 1682, he entertained the Duke of Monmouth at his seat in Cheshire.

In 1684 the question of the Gawsworth title was revived (partly no doubt as a political move) by an application on the part of Fitton to the lord keeper, Francis, Lord Guilford, to review the case. Roger North, the 17th-century biographer, who being Guildford's brother was well placed to know the facts, wrote that as Fitton was then in favour at court, while Macclesfield (Gerard) was "stiff of the anti-court party", it was generally anticipated that the lord keeper would, independently of the merits of the case, decide in favour of Fitton. In fact, however, he refused the application on the ground that the claim was stale, a "pitch of heroical justice" which North cannot adequately extol, and which so impressed Macclesfield that he expended a shilling in the purchase of the lord keeper's portrait.

The grand jury of Cheshire having presented Macclesfield on 17 September as disaffected to the government and recommended that he should be bound over to keep the peace, Macclesfield retaliated by an action of scandalum magnatum against a juryman named Starkey, laying the damages at £10,000. The case was tried in the exchequer chamber on 25 November 1684, and resulted in judgement for the defendant. On 7 September 1685, a royal proclamation was issued for Macclesfield's apprehension. He fled to the continent, and sentence of outlawry was passed against him.

== William III ==
Macclesfield spent the next three years in Germany and the Netherlands, returning to England in the revolution of 1688. During the progress of the Prince of Orange from Torbay to London, Gerard commanded his body-guard, a troop of some two hundred cavaliers, mostly English, mounted on Flemish chargers, whose splendid appearance excited much admiration. In February 1689 he was sworn of the Privy Council, and appointed lord president of the council of the Welsh Marches, and lord-lieutenant of Gloucester, Hereford, Monmouth, and North and South Wales. His outlawry was formally reversed in the following April. His political attitude is curiously illustrated by his speech in the debate on the Abjuration Bill. Lord Wharton, after owning that he had taken more oaths than he could remember, said that he should be "very unwilling to charge himself with more at the end of his days", whereupon Macclesfield rose and said that "he was in much the same case with Lord Wharton, though they had not always taken the same oaths; but he never knew them of any use but to make people declare against government that would have submitted quietly to it if they had been let alone". He also disclaimed having had much hand in bringing about the revolution.

In July 1690 he was one of a commission appointed to inquire into the conduct of the fleet during a recent engagement with the French off Beachy Head, which had not terminated so successfully as had been anticipated. He died on 7 January 1694 suddenly in a fit of vomiting, and was buried on the 18th in Exeter vault in Westminster Abbey. The title and his estates passed to his son and heir Charles.

== Character ==
Samuel Pepys denounced Gerard as a "proud and violent man" whose "rogueries and cheats" were notorious. Elrington Ball, in his study of his cousin and enemy Alexander Fitton, while accepting that Fitton was not a suitable character to be Lord Chancellor of Ireland, remarked that however bad Fitton's character it cannot have been as bad as Gerard's.

== Family ==
Macclesfield married Jane, daughter of Pierre de Civelle, a Frenchman resident in England. Little is known of her except that in 1663 she was dismissed by Charles II from attendance on the queen for tattling to her about Lady Castlemaine, and that on one occasion while being carried in her chair through the city she was mistaken for the Duchess of Portsmouth, saluted as the French whore, and mobbed by the populace. They had two sons and three daughters:

- Charles (c. 1659–1701), who succeeded to the title
- Fitton (1663–1702), who succeeded to the title on the death of his brother
- Elizabeth, who married Digby Gerard, 5th Baron Gerard of Bromley, and was buried in Westminster Abbey
- Charlotte
- Anne

== Bibliography ==
- Ball, F. Elrington (1926). The Judges in Ireland 1221-1921. London: John Murray.

Attribution

- This article incorporates text from a publication now in the public domain: Rigg, James McMullen (1890). "Gerard, Charles (d.1694)". In Stephen, Leslie (ed.). Dictionary of National Biography. Vol. 21. London: Smith, Elder & Co. p. 212. Endnotes:
  - Granger's Biogr. Hist. (4th ed.), iii. 219;
  - Doyle's Baronage;
  - Bank's Extinct Peerage, iii. 304;
  - Burke's Extinct Peerage;
  - Phillips's Civil War in Wales;
  - Duke of Manchester's Court and Society from Elizabeth to Anne, i. 335, i. 123.

Military offices
New regiment	Captain and Colonel of His Majesty's Own Troop of Horse Guards; 1660–1668	Succeeded by The Duke of Monmouth
Honorary titles
Preceded by The Duke of Beaufort	Lord President of Wales; 1689	Office abolished
Preceded by The Duke of Beaufort	Lord Lieutenant of North Wales (Anglesey, Caernarvonshire, Denbighshire, Flintshire, Merionethshire and Montgomeryshire) and Herefordshire; 1689–1694	Succeeded by The Duke of Shrewsbury
Preceded by The Duke of Beaufort	Lord Lieutenant of Gloucestershire; 1689–1694	Succeeded by Viscount Dursley
Preceded by The Duke of Beaufort	Custos Rotulorum of Herefordshire; 1689–1694	Succeeded by The Lord Coningsby
Preceded by The Duke of Beaufort	Custos Rotulorum of Monmouthshire; 1689–1694	Succeeded by Thomas Morgan
Preceded by The Duke of Beaufort	Lord Lieutenant of South Wales (Brecknockshire, Cardiganshire, Carmarthenshire, Glamorgan, Pembrokeshire, and Radnorshire) and Monmouthshire; 1689–1694	Succeeded by The Earl of Pembroke
Preceded by Sir Rowland Gwynne	Custos Rotulorum of Brecknockshire; 1689–1694	Succeeded by The Lord Herbert of Chirbury
Peerage of England
New creation	Earl of Macclesfield; 1679–1694	Succeeded by Charles Gerard
New creation	Baron Gerard; 1645–1694	Succeeded by Charles Gerard
