= List of baronetcies in the Baronetage of the United Kingdom: S =

Peerages and baronetcies of Britain and Ireland
Extant	All
Dukes	Dukedoms
Marquesses	Marquessates
Earls	Earldoms
Viscounts	Viscountcies
Barons	Baronies
Baronets	Baronetcies
En, Ire, NS, GB, UK (extinct)

This is a list of baronetcies in the Baronetage of the United Kingdom. They have been created since 1801 when they replaced the baronetages in the Baronetage of Great Britain, and Baronetage of Ireland. This list is not currently complete.

Title	Date of creation	Surname	Current status	Notes
Salomons of Broom Hill and Great Cumberland Place	1869	Salomons, Goldsmid-Sterns-Salomons	extinct 1925	
Salt of Saltaire	1869	Salt	extant	
Salt of Weeping Cross	1899	Salt	extant	
Samman of Routh	1921	Samman	extinct 1960	
Samuel of Chelwood Vetchery	1912	Samuel	extinct 1926	
Samuel of Mancroft	1932	Samuel	extant	first Baronet created Baron Mancroft in 1937
Samuel of the Mote and Portland Place	1903	Samuel	extant	Lord Mayor of London; first Baronet created Viscount Bearsted in 1925
Samuel of Nevern Square	1898	Samuel	extant	
Samuelson of Bodicote Grange and Prince's Gate	1884	Samuelson	extant	
Sandeman of Kenlygreen	1929	Sandeman	extinct 1940	
Sanders of Bayford	1920	Sanders	extinct 1950	first Baronet created Baron Bayford in 1929
Sanderson of Malling Deanery	1920	Sanderson	extant	
Sassoon of Bombay	1909	Sassoon	extinct 1931	
Sassoon of Kensington-gore and of Eastern-terrace	1890	Sassoon	extinct 1939	
Savory of Buckhurst Park	1891	Savory	extinct 1921	Lord Mayor of London
Savory of The Woodland	1890	Savory	extinct 1961	
Scarisbrick of Greaves Hall	1909	Scarisbrick	extinct 1955	
Schroder of The Dell	1892	Schroder	extinct 1910	
Schuster of Collingham Road	1906	Schuster	extinct 1996	
Scott of Abbotsford	1820	Scott	extinct 1847	Author Sir Walter Scott
Scott of Beauclerc	1907	Scott	extant	
Scott of Connaught Place	1899	Scott	extinct 1912	
Sibbald, later Scott of Dunninald	1806	Sibbald, Scott	extinct 1945	
Scott of Great Barr	1806	Scott	dormant	third Baronet had already inherited the Bateman Baronetcy of Hartington Hall (created 1806) when he succeeded in 1851; in 1905 the Bateman Baronetcy was inherited by the fourth Fuller-Acland-Hood Baronet of St Audries; eighth Baronet died 1980 - under review
Scott of Lytchet Minster	1821	Scott	extinct 1961	
Scott of Rotherfield Park	1962	Scott	extant	
Scott of The Yews	1909	Scott	extant	
Scott of Witley	1913	Scott	extant	
Scotter of Surbiton	1907	Scotter	extinct 1911	
Scourfield of the Mote and Williamston	1876	Scourfield	extinct 1921	
Seager of St Mellons	1952	Seager	dormant	first Baronet created Baron Leighton of St Mellons in 1962; first Baronet died 1963
Seale of Mount Boone	1838	Seale	extant	
Seaman of Bouverie Street	1933	Seaman	extinct 1936	
Seely of Sherwood Lodge and Brooke House	1896	Seely	extant	third Baronet created Baron Sherwood in 1941, which title became extinct in 1970
Selby-Bigge of King's Sutton	1919	Selby-Bigge	extinct 1973	
Seton-Steuart of Allanton	1815	Seton-Steuart	extinct 1930	
Seymour of High Mount and Friery Park	1809	Seymour, Culme-Seymour	extant	
Seymour of the Army	1869	Seymour	extinct 1949	
Shakerley of Somerford Park	1838	Shakerley	extant	
Shakespeare of Lakenham	1942	Shakespeare	extant	
Sharp of Heckmondwike	1920	Sharp	extant	
Sharp of Maidstone	1922	Sharp	extant	
Shaw of Bushy Park	1821	Shaw	extant	
Shaw of Kilmarnock	1809	Shaw	extinct 1843	Lord Mayor of London; first Baronet obtained a new patent in 1813 (see below); this creation became extinct in 1868
Shaw of Kilmarnock	1813	Shaw	extinct 1868	Lord Mayor of London; the first Baronet had already been created a Baronet in 1809, which title became extinct in 1843
Shaw of Wolverhampton	1908	Shaw	extinct 1942	
Sheaffe of Boston	1813	Sheaffe	extinct 1851	
Shelley-Sidney of Penshurst	1818	Shelley-Sidney, Sidney	extant	second Baronet created Baron de L'Isle and Dudley in 1835; the sixth Baron was created Viscount De L'Isle in 1956 and also inherited the Shelley Baronetcy of Castle Goring in 1965
Shelley of Castle Goring	1806	Shelley, Shelley-Rolls, Sidney	extant	inherited by the Viscount De L'Isle in 1956
Sheppard of Thornton Hall	1809	Sheppard	extinct 1848	
Shepperson of Upwood	1945	Shepperson	extinct 1949	
Shiffner of Coombe	1818	Shiffner	extant	
Silvester of Yardley	1815	Silvester	extinct 1822	first Baronet obtained a new patent in 1822, which creation became extinct in 1828
Silvester of Yardley	1822	Silvester	extinct 1828	first Baronet had already been created a Baronet in 1815, which creation became extinct in 1822
Simeon of Grazeley	1815	Simeon	extant	
Simpson of Bradley Hall	1935	Simpson	extinct 1981	
Simpson of Strathavon and Edinburgh	1866	Simpson	extinct 1924	
Sitwell of Renishaw	1808	Sitwell	extant	
Skinner of Chelsea	1912	Skinner	extant	
Slade of Maunsell Grange	1831	Slade	extant	
Sleight of Weelsby Hall	1920	Sleight	extant	
Smiley of Alton	1903	Smiley	extant	
Smith of Aliwal	1846	Smith	extinct 1860	
Smith of Birkenhead	1918	Smith	extinct 1985	first Baronet created Earl of Birkenhead in 1922
Smith of Colwyn Bay	1912	Smith	extant	first Baronet created Baron Colwyn in 1917
Smith of Crowmallie	1945	Smith	extant	
Smith of Eardistown	1809	Smith	dormant	fifth Baronet died 2000
Smith of Jamaica	1838	Smith, Smith-Gordon	dormant	fourth Baronet died 1976 - under review
Smith of Keighley	1947	Smith, Bracewell-Smith	extant	Lord Mayor of London
Smith of Kidderminster	1920	Smith	extinct 1961	
Smith of Pickering	1821	Smith	extinct 1837	
Smith of Stratford Place	1897	Smith	extant	
Smith of Tring Park	1804	Smith, Hamilton-Spencer-Smith	extant	
Smyth of Ashton Court	1859	Smyth	extinct 1901	
Smyth of Teignmouth	1956	Smyth	extant	
Snadden of Coldock	1955	Snadden	extinct 1959	
Southby of Burford	1937	Southby	extant	
Spearman of Hanwell	1840	Spearman	extant	
Spears of Warfield	1953	Spears	extinct 1974	
Spencer-Nairn of Monimail	1933	Spencer-Nairn	extant	
Speyer of Grosvenor Street	1906	Speyer	extinct 1932	
Spicer of Lancaster Gate	1906	Spicer	extant	
Sprot of Garnkirk	1918	Sprot	extinct 1929	
St Aubyn of St Michael's Mount	1866	St Aubyn	extant	second Baronet created Baron St Levan in 1887
St Paul of Ewart Park	1813	St Paul	extinct 1891	
Stafford of Rockingham	1914	Stafford, Stafford-King-Harman	extinct 1987	
Stamer of Beauchamp	1809	Stamer	extant	Lord Mayor of Dublin
Stanhope of Stanwell	1807	Stanhope	extinct 1952	third Baronet succeeded as Earl of Chesterfield in 1883
Stanier of Peplow Hall	1917	Stanier	extant	
Starkey of Norwood Park	1935	Starkey	extant	
Steel of Murieston	1903	Steel	extinct 1904	Lord Provost of Edinburgh
Stephen of de Vere Gardens	1891	Stephen	extinct 1987	
Stephen of Montreal	1886	Stephen	extinct 1921	first Baronet created Baron Mount Stephen in 1891
Stephenson of Hassop Hall	1936	Stephenson	dormant	second Baronet died 1982
Stern of Chertsey	1922	Stern	extinct 1933	
Stern of Strawberry Hill	1905	Stern	extinct 1984	first Baronet created Baron Michelham in 1905
Stevenson of Clevedon	1914	Stevenson	extinct 1944	Lord Provost of Glasgow
Stevenson of Walton Heath	1917	Stevenson	extinct 1926	first Baronet created Baron Stevenson in 1924
Stewart-Clark of Dundas	1918	Stewart-Clark	extant	
Stewart of Athenree	1803	Stewart	extant	
Stewart of Balgownie	1920	Stewart	extant	Lord Provost of Glasgow
Stewart of Fingask	1920	Stewart	extant	
Stewart of South Kensington	1881	Stewart	extinct 1951	
Stewart of Stewartby	1937	Stewart	extant ?	
Stewart of Strathgarry	1960	Stewart	extant	
Stockdale of Hoddington	1960	Stockdale	extant	first Baronet created the Lord Mayor of London
Stockenström of Maas Ström	1840	Stockenström	extinct 1957	
Stoker of Hatch Street	1911	Stoker	extinct 1912	
Stokes of Lensfield Cottage	1889	Stokes	extinct 1916	
Storey of Settrington	1960	Storey	extant	first Baronet created a life peer as Baron Buckton in 1966, which title became extinct in 1978
Stott of Stanton	1920	Stott	extant	
Stracey of Rackheath Park	1818	Stracey	extant	
Strachey of Sutton Court	1801	Strachey	dormant	fourth Baronet created Baron Strachie in 1911, which title became extinct in 1971; fifth Baronet died 1973
Strang-Steel of Philiphaugh	1938	Strang-Steel	extant	
Stronge of Tynan	1803	Stronge	dormant	Dormant. 8th Bt died 1981.
Stuart-Menteth of New Cumnock	1838	Stuart-Menteth	extant	
Stuart-Taylor of Kennington	1917	Stuart-Taylor	extant	President of the Royal College of Physicians
Stuart of Oxford	1841	Stuart	extinct 1915	
Stucley of Affeton Castle and Hartland Abbey	1859	Stucley	extant	
Studd of Netheravon	1929	Studd	extant	Lord Mayor of London
Studholme of Perridge	1956	Studholme	extant	
Sturdee of the Falkland Islands	1916	Sturdee	extinct 1970	
Sullivan of Garryduff	1881	Sullivan	extinct 1937	Master of the Rolls in Ireland
Sullivan of Thames Ditton	1804	Sullivan	extant	
Summers of Sholton	1952	Summers	extinct 1993	
Sutherland of Dunstanburgh Castle	1921	Sutherland	extant	
Sutton of Beckenham	1922	Sutton	extinct 1934	
Sutton of Castle House	1919	Sutton	extinct 1947	
Sutton of Moulsey	1806	Sutton	extinct 1813	
Schwann, later Swann of Princes Gardens	1906	Schwann, Swann	extant	
Sykes of Cheadle	1918	Sykes	extinct 1950	
Sykes of Kingsknowes	1921	Sykes	extant	
Synge of Kiltrough	1801	Synge	extant	
