= Robert Bickersteth =

Robert Bickersteth may refer to:

- Robert Bickersteth (bishop) (1816–1884), Bishop of Ripon
- Robert Bickersteth (MP) (1847–1916), Liberal MP, son of the above
