= Scottish volunteers in the Spanish Civil War =

Scottish Volunteers in the Spanish Civil War comprised 23% of the estimated 2,400 men and women who travelled from Great Britain to serve in the International Brigades in the Spanish Civil War. Along with the 549 military volunteers, extensive funds and support for Republican Spain were raised through a nationwide grass-roots Aid for Spain movement; per capita, Scotland's contributions were among the most substantial foreign aid offered to the Republic over the period of 1936–1939.

== Background ==
The majority of the Scottish men and women who supported the Spanish Republic were affiliated with socialist, communist and trade-unionist entities. Scottish life in the 1930s was characterised by high levels of unemployment, threatened redundancies and living standards which had resulted in the highest death rate in northern Europe Many volunteers had previously been involved in extensive labour struggles and protests against Oswald Mosely's British Union of Fascists, believing that left-wing politics offered an escape from poverty. In aiding the Spanish Republican government against the military coup orchestrated by General Francisco Franco in the summer of 1936, Scottish volunteers identified with the potential for social progressive change that Spain represented at the time. Concurrent with a background of political activism for many of the volunteers was the viewpoint that if Fascism went unchecked in Spain, it would soon spread to Great Britain. Recruitment was further boosted by individuals' disillusionment with the government in Westminster in signing the Non-Intervention Treaty on 4 August 1936 and with the initial support of non-intervention by both the National Labour Party and the Trades Union Congress.

== Support for the Spanish Second Republic ==
=== Medical Aid ===
The first organised group from Scotland to go into Spain was a medical unit. The Scottish Ambulance Unit, led by Fernanda Jacobsen and created by Daniel Macaulay Stevenson (the ex Lord Provost of Glasgow and the contemporary Chancellor of Glasgow University) in 1936, acted as a mobile medical service on first the Toledo front and later during the Siege of Madrid. Volunteer medics, drivers and nurses travelled to Spain independently, and worked both under battlefield conditions and in hospitals with a paucity of facilities and resources.

=== International Brigades ===
According to the most recent study, approximately 520 Scots volunteered to fight for the Spanish Republic as part of the International Brigades, with earlier estimates placing the figure between 437 and 549. The bulk of Scottish International Brigaders came from working-class backgrounds, and from the urban and industrialized areas of Aberdeen, Dundee, Edinburgh, Fife, Lanarkshire and Glasgow. Politically, just over half of the volunteers were affiliated with the Communist Party of Great Britain, while a much smaller number were affiliated with the Labour Party and other left-wing groups. About a fifth of the volunteers had been involved with the National Unemployed Workers' Movement.

No organised military recruitment process existed at the beginning, and few Scots travelled to Spain before the winter of 1936-7, when the Communist Party started organising parties of volunteers and paying their travel expenses, after which the number of Scottish volunteers rose markedly. The usual route was through Paris, evading the illegality of their actions through claiming that they were off to France for a weekend holiday before taking the train to the French border, and then travelled by foot over the Pyrenees into Spain.

Scottish International Brigaders chiefly saw service in Spain as part of the British Battalion, formed in January 1937 as part of the XVth International Brigade. They saw extended action first at the Battle of Jarama and later at Brunete; both battles saw high levels of Scottish casualties. International Brigaders captured by Franco's forces throughout the three-year conflict were either executed, repatriated back to Britain under threat of death upon re-entry, or held in Spanish prisons for the remainder of the war. Levels of desertion were relatively low and/or unreported, with the exception of the ‘Round Robin Deserters’ who returned to Scotland when confronted with the high casualties at the Jarama front, and who were subsequently pilloried for their actions by both the press and their peers. The Ebro offensive and the victory at Sandesco in 1938 both gave hope to the Republican armies, however, the three days of fighting at Sierra Lavell resulted in heavy Scottish casualties. In September 1938, republican prime minister Juan Negrin announced to the League of Nations that all foreign volunteers were to be discharged and repatriated, and Scottish military participation in the Spanish Civil War ended with a parade through the streets of Barcelona before the International Brigades were disbanded.

While the International Brigaders were met widespread local appreciation upon their return to Scotland, the official view was considerably more frosty, with the Foreign Office requesting that the volunteers reimburse the government for the funds (3 pound, 19.3d) per head that had been required to pay their passage home from Spain. Ex-Brigaders could find it difficult to enlist in the Royal Air Force and Royal Navy, although by mid-1940, as the urgency of Britain's situation grew clear, these restrictions were relaxed. Even then, particularly for those heavily involved in the Communist Party, it could often be difficult to obtain overseas postings or promotions and many former volunteers were subject to surveillance in civilian and military life for years afterwards.

The last Scottish International Brigade veteran, Steve Fullerton, died in 2008.

=== Aid for Spain ===
In Scotland, the creation of the Aid for Spain movement worked to raise both funds and awareness of the Republican movement (Gray, 103). Events such as concerts, film showings and political meetings became a regular feature of daily life. Joint aid boards were established in order to coordinate fund-raising efforts; these became aggregated in February 1938 under the Scottish Joint Committee for Spanish Relief. While an attempt to create a national support movement through uniting the CPGB, the ILP and the Socialist League wing of the Labour Party proved unsuccessful, local activity remained strong: at the Glasgow May Day Rally of 1937, 15,000 people turned out to march under the banner of ‘Solidarity with Spain’ while Dundonians in that same year raised enough money to buy and send an ambulance to the Republican front.

A food ship carrying 100 tons of food for those under siege in Spain was chartered and sent by a collaborative venture from the Edinburgh and Glasgow Trades Councils, while in Dundee, the Basque Children's Committee was created in order to provide an accommodation for children from the Basque region who had been evacuated to southern England in 1937. 25 children eventually travelled to Scotland to reside at Mall Park in Montrose, and 200 refugee children were taken in by the Co-operative Society in Rothesay. After the war, aid continued in the form of offers of accommodation, transport and finances for Spanish refugees who had been displaced by the war.

== Support for the Nationalist faction ==
While the British Union of Fascists rarely found a stronghold in Scotland, the population of Scotland was not uniformely pro-Republican either. Opponents to the Republic fell primarily into one of two categories: they either supported Franco and Falangist ideologies, or they opposed the Republicans on the grounds of anti-communism and the atrocities perpetuated by republican forces upon Christians and the Catholic Church in Spain. Papers such as the Daily Mail and the Daily Express often functioned as anti-Republican propaganda, as did (to a lesser extent) the Glasgow Evening Express. Support for the Nationalists came predominantly from local BUF branches and from aristocracy such as Patrick Boyle, 8th Earl of Glasgow, who held long-standing military ties. Captain Archibald Maule Ramsay, the Scottish Unionist MP for Peebles, formed the United Christian Front, whose manifesto alleged that Franco's forces were engaged in fighting the Anti-Christ in Spain, while Major-General Sir Walter Maxwell-Scott formed the Scottish Friends of National Spain, whose first meeting is notable for denying that the attack on Guernica was air-based, and resulting in a riot with pro-Republican protestors.

== Recognition and memorials ==
The Spanish Civil War has become an emerging topic for historians in Spain and in countries which housed significant numbers of International Brigaders. In Scotland, the International Brigaders are chiefly recognized now for articulating at the time that the Spanish Civil War was effectively the opening salvo of the Second World War. Public interest is also a visible phenomenon. Extensive commemoration began in 1996 for the 60th anniversary and memorial plaques, pamphlets and exhibitions were produced in Glasgow, Edinburgh, Dundee and Aberdeen by local Trades Councils, remaining International Brigaders and their relatives. In 2006, a day-long symposium at the National Library of Scotland sold out weeks in advance, while STV produced a two-part documentary of previously unseen archival footage, interviews, and modern commemorative activity in 2009's The Scots Who Fought Franco, and William Maley's play "From Calton to Catalonia" has been performed regularly in Glasgow theatres since its publication in 1990. Monuments recognizing the Scottish volunteers can be found in each of Scotland's major cities.

The renowned Scottish Gaelic poet Sorley Maclean had strong sympathies with the Republicans. Much of his earlier poetry focuses on the war, such as "Cornford" about British poets John Cornford and Julian Bell and the Spanish writer Federico García Lorca, who all died as a result of the war. In "An Roghainn" ("The Choice"), the poet expresses disappointment about his decision to stay in Scotland. This was put to a tune and is sung on the album by North Uist singer Julie Fowlis.
