= Alexander Stanier =

British Army officer

Brigadier Sir Alexander Stanier Bt DSO* MC
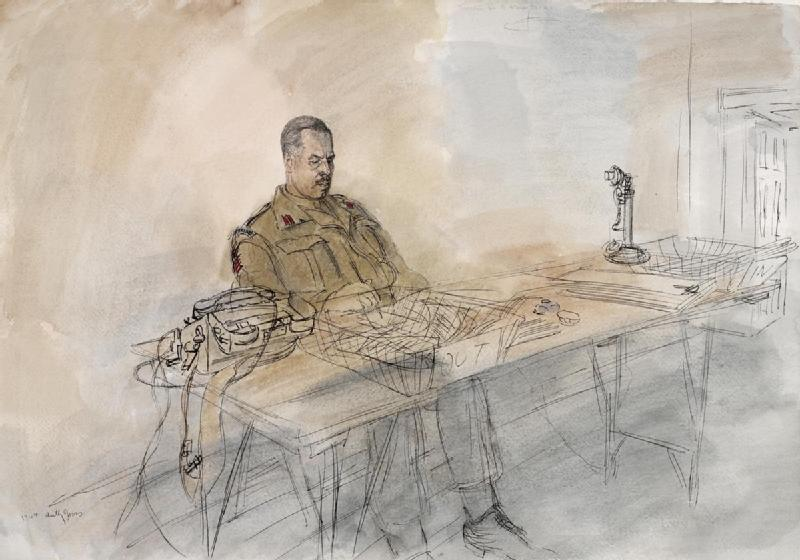
- Born: 31 January 1899; Market Drayton, Shropshire, England
- Died: 10 January 1995 (aged 95)
- Military career
- Allegiance: United Kingdom
- Branch: British Army
- Service years: 1917–1948
- Rank: Brigadier
- Nickname: "Sammy"
- Service number: 13863
- Unit: Welsh Guards
- Commands: 69th Infantry Brigade; 231st Infantry Brigade; 183rd Infantry Brigade; 3rd Parachute Brigade; 223rd Independent Infantry Brigade; 2nd Battalion, Welsh Guards
- Conflicts: First World War; Second World War
- Awards: Distinguished Service Order & Bar; Military Cross; Commander of the Order of Leopold II (Belgium); Croix de Guerre (Belgium); Silver Star (United States); Legion of Honour (France)

Brigadier Sir Alexander Beville Gibbons Stanier, 2nd Baronet, DSO & Bar, MC (31 January 1899 – 10 January 1995) was a British Army officer who fought in the First and Second World Wars, particularly distinguished for his actions at Boulogne in 1940, on D-Day in 1944, and in the Rhineland in 1944.

== Early life ==
Stanier was born on 31 January 1899, the eldest son of Beville Stanier of Peplow Hall in Shropshire. His father was elected Member of Parliament for Newport, Shropshire, in 1908, and was created a Baronet by David Lloyd George in 1917 for organising Sugar beet production during the First World War. In that year, his son Alexander, who had been educated at Summer Fields and Eton, passed through the Royal Military College at Sandhurst as a wartime cadet and was commissioned into the newly raised Welsh Guards on 21 December.

== First World War ==
In his year with the 1st Battalion of the Welsh Guards on the Western Front, Stanier displayed aptitude for the mobile warfare that followed the crumbling of the German defences. He was awarded the Military Cross (MC) (dated 2 April 1919) for his actions during the Second Battle of Cambrai, a month before the Armistice. His citation reads as follows:

For conspicuous gallantry and able leadership at St. Vaast on 11 October 1918. He rallied his platoon under heavy fire, and after personally reconnoiting (sic) the ground in front, led his men forward 200 yards to a good fir[ing] position. His good leadership and prompt action prevented casualties and gained valuable ground.

== Between the wars ==
Stanier decided to pursue a military career when the war ended, and he continued in the Army rather than manage the family estates when his father died in 1921 and he succeeded to the baronetcy as Sir Alexander Stanier. He was promoted to lieutenant on 21 June 1919. He served with the 1st Battalion, Welsh Guards in Germany, Egypt and Gibraltar, being the battalion adjutant in 1923–26, with a promotion to captain on 1 October 1924. From 1927 to 1930 he was military secretary to the governor of Gibraltar, successively serving General Sir Charles Monro and General Sir Alexander Godley.

He relinquished this assignment in January 1930 and was promoted to major on 1 October 1932 and to lieutenant-colonel on 18 May 1939.

== Second World War ==
=== Boulogne ===
On the outbreak of the Second World War, Stanier was given the task of raising a second battalion of the Welsh Guards. In May 1940, when it became clear that the Battle of France was lost and that the British Expeditionary Force would have to be evacuated, 2nd Welsh Guards and 2nd Irish Guards were hastily sent (as 20th Independent Infantry Brigade) to Boulogne to cover the withdrawal of British troops through that port. This was a hazardous operation and could easily have led to the destruction or capture of the force, but Stanier made his dispositions soundly, and although badly mauled his battalion was successfully evacuated by the Royal Navy while destroyers engaged German tanks on the quay. Stanier was awarded his first Distinguished Service Order for his bravery and leadership during this two-day operation.

=== Home defence ===
Stanier was given the temporary rank of brigadier and assigned command of a new home defence brigade, the 223rd Independent Infantry Brigade, which he commanded and trained from its formation on 18 October 1940 until it was converted into the 3rd Parachute Brigade on 7 November 1942. He continued in command during the conversion period until 8 December, when he handed over to Brigadier Gerald Lathbury.

On 17 February 1943 Stanier took command of the 183rd Infantry Brigade forming part of 61st Infantry Division, a second line Territorial Army (TA) formation also deployed in a home defence role. At one point during these years of training, Stanier lost an eye when a soldier dropped a primed grenade by mistake. Luckily, the doctors did not downgrade him medically, because he was selected for a key role in the forthcoming Normandy landings. He was promoted to colonel on 31 December 1943.

=== Arromanches ===
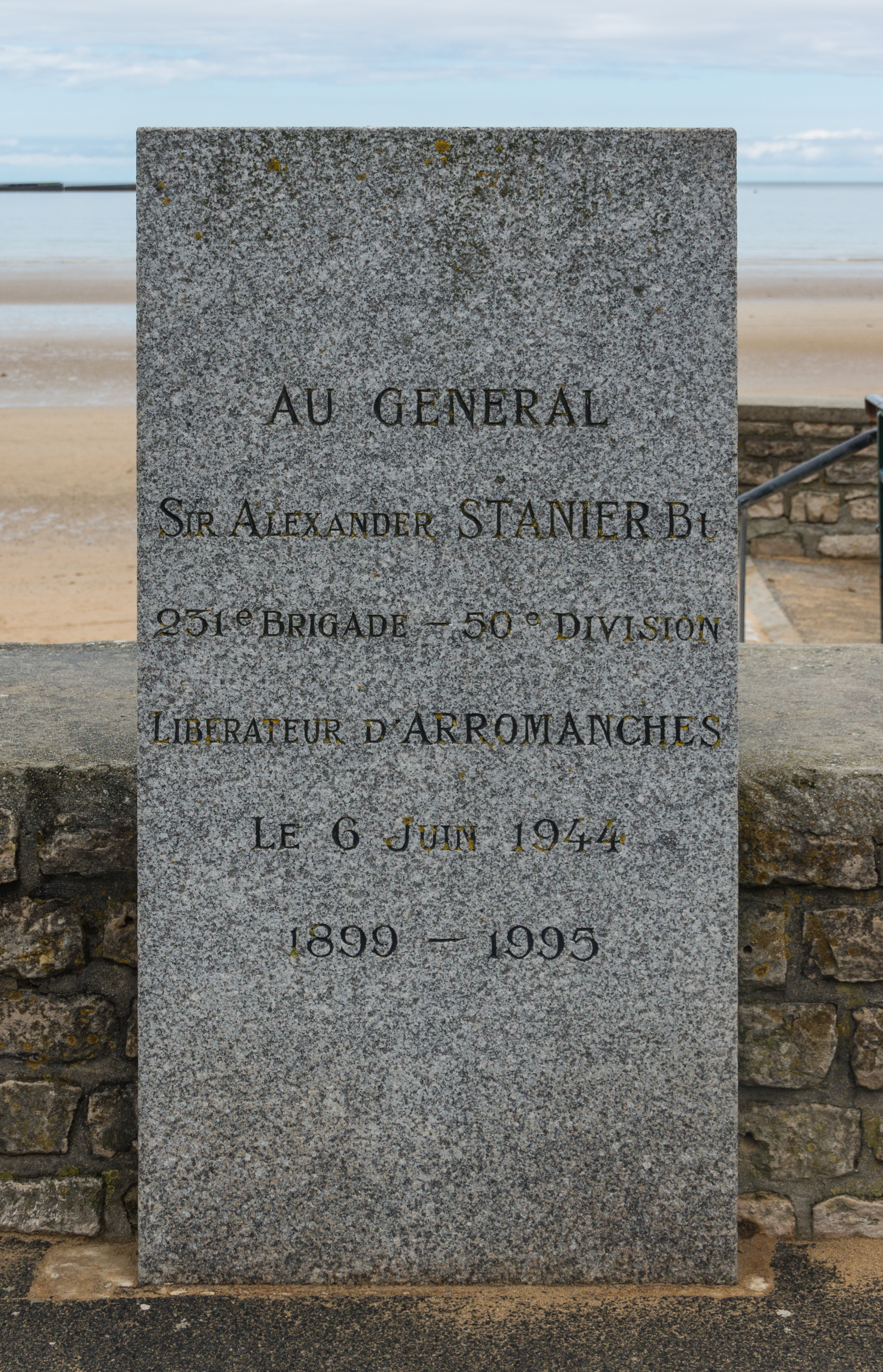
Memorial to Brigadier Stanier at Arromanches.

On 23 February 1944 Stanier took command of the 231st Infantry Brigade. The brigade was composed of three Regular Army battalions from Southern England that had formed part of the garrison of Malta all through the siege of 1940–42. They had then become an independent brigade group for the amphibious operation against Sicily (Operation Husky). Now they were to use that experience to spearhead the assault landings on D-Day.

The 231st Brigade was one of three (the others being the 69th and 151st) which formed part of the 50th (Northumbrian) Infantry Division, another TA formation, then commanded by Major General Douglas Graham, who had recently taken command. Stanier's 231st Brigade were tasked with capturing 'Jig' Beach, the westernmost section of Gold Beach. The coast here is low-lying and sandy, but with soft patches of clay on the foreshore, and soggy grassland inland, both of which would cause heavy vehicles to become bogged down. The beach was defended with beach obstacles and covered by fire from the German strongpoints at Asnelles sur Mer and le Hamel. Once ashore, the brigade was to push westwards along the coast to capture Arromanches-les-Bains, the planned site of the artificial Mulberry harbour that was crucial to the invasion plan.

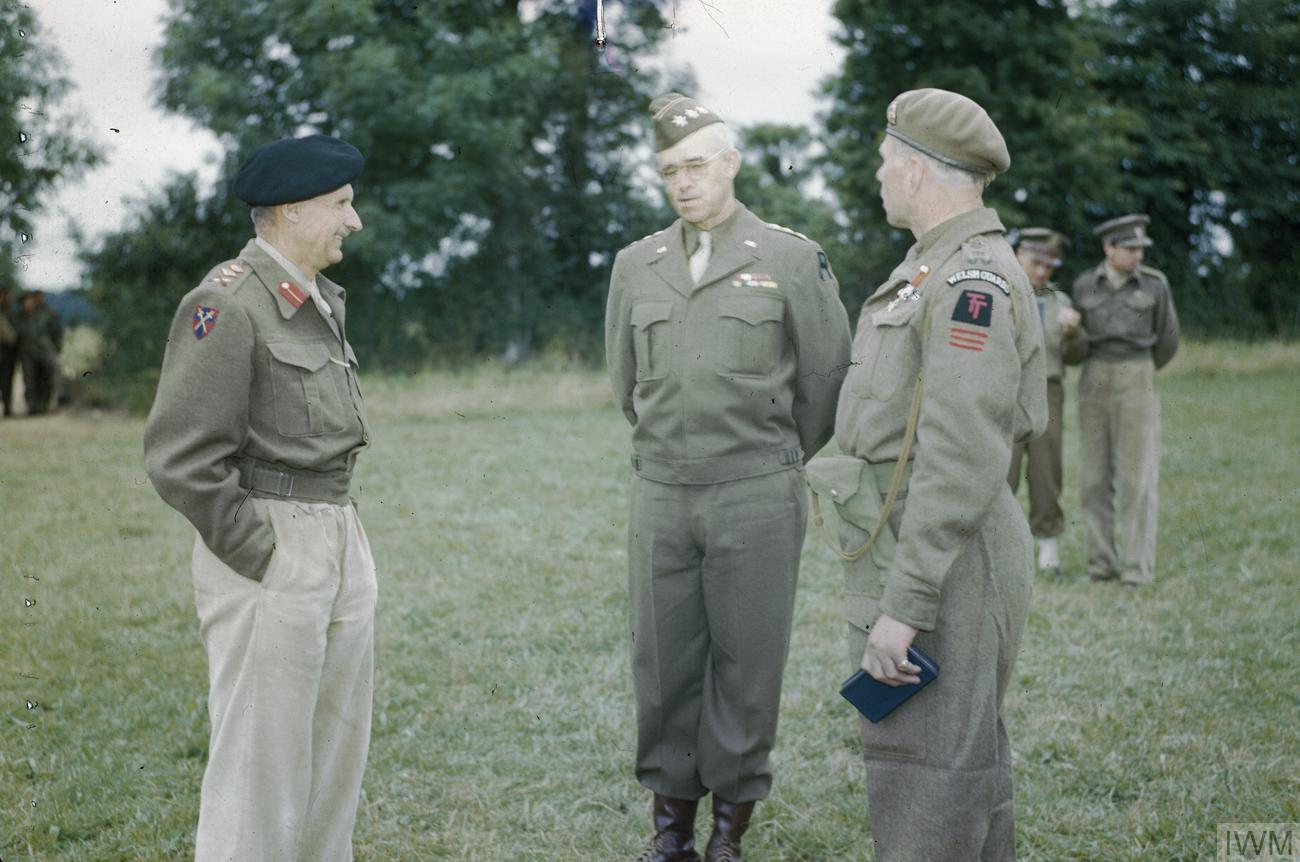
General Sir Bernard Montgomery with the U.S. First Army commander, Lieutenant General Omar Bradley (centre), and Stanier at Montgomery's HQ in Normandy. Stanier had just received the Silver Star from Bradley.

The plan began to break down from the beginning. Bad weather and enemy fire delayed the amphibious DD tanks and Royal Marines Armoured Support Group tanks, so the first wave of infantry landed at 07.25 without any support. Two control vessels were hit during the run-in, which meant that the planned artillery shoot on le Hamel did not happen, and an attack by Royal Air Force (RAF) Typhoons had failed to suppress its garrison. The leading companies of the 1st Battalion, Hampshire Regiment lost their senior officers, wireless sets and artillery observers, and were unable to call down supporting fire, but when the rest of the battalion arrived 20 minutes later they organised an infantry attack on the le Hamel position. On their left the 1st Battalion, Dorset Regiment had better luck, and with the help of flail tanks of the Westminster Dragoons began to clear beach exits and move inland.

At about 08.15, the brigade's reserve battalion, the 2nd Devonshire Regiment, began landing, closely followed by No. 47 (Royal Marine) Commando and then Stanier's HQ. The Commandos lost a number of men and vital equipment during the landing, but with a wireless set borrowed from brigade HQ, they set off westwards to make contact with the US troops at Omaha Beach, while Stanier organised an attack against le Hamel, supported by 147th Field Regiment, Royal Artillery. By nightfall, both le Hamel and Arromanches were in British hands: the 231st Brigade had taken the Arromanches radar station and the German artillery battery was abandoned without firing a shot after being shelled by the cruiser HMS Emerald (D66). Stanier had also been able to send the Dorsets to help 8th Armoured Brigade take Loucelles from the 12th SS Panzer Division Hitlerjugend.

After the war, Stanier was treated as a hero by the liberated people of Asnelles and Arromanches, who named a town square after him. He attended the 40th and 50th D-Day anniversary celebrations, and was a leading instigator of the Arromanches museum. In 1988, he was awarded the Legion of Honour for his outstanding services to Anglo-French relations.

=== North-West Europe ===
After D-Day, Stanier led his brigade in all of the 50th Division's operations for the rest of 1944. On 14 June, the brigade captured la Senaudière during Operation Perch, and after weeks of fighting in the bocage it headed the division's attack on Caumont on 30 July during the break-out from the Normandy beachhead. By late August the 50th Division was supporting the British armoured divisions in their thrust across the River Seine towards the River Somme and the Belgian frontier. On 3 September the 231st Brigade, under the command of the Guards Armoured Division, helped to liberate Brussels.

The 50th Division had a minor role in Operation Market Garden: on 17 September Stanier's 2nd Dorsets actually supported the Irish Guards Group at the beginning of the Guards Armoured Division's attack up the road towards the airborne troops' drop zones on the way to Arnhem, but as the operation progressed the division was left to protect the narrow corridor behind the advancing tanks. After the failure of Market Garden, the 50th Division was left to defend the captured area beyond the River Waal against determined German counter-attacks in early October 1944. Stanier was later awarded a Bar to his DSO for his actions during the autumn of bitter fighting in the Rhine valley.

By now the British Second Army (under whose command the 50th Division was serving) was suffering an acute manpower shortage, and as the junior English formation in the theatre, the 50th Division was chosen to be broken to provide drafts to other divisions. On 29 October it moved back into Belgium, from which the headquarters and cadres of the skeleton division returned to the United Kingdom to reform as a training division. Stanier's brigade became a reserve formation. Stanier left on 14 February 1945 to take command of another reserve brigade (the 69th) briefly, before reverting to the rank of Colonel to command the Welsh Guards with the remit to prepare for demobilisation and postwar reorganisation.

== Postwar ==
Stanier was awarded a number of foreign decorations for his wartime service, including the Belgian Order of Leopold II and Croix de Guerre (with palms), and the US Silver Star. After commanding the Welsh Guards in the early postwar years, Stanier retired from the Army on 2 May 1948 with the honorary rank of brigadier.

Although Peplow Hall had been sold in the 1920s, Stanier returned in retirement to the family tradition of farming and local politics in Shropshire. He became a county councillor in 1950, serving for eight years, and was High Sheriff of Shropshire and Deputy Lieutenant for the county in 1951. Stanier was county president of St John Ambulance from 1950 to 1960. He was also chairman of the governors for Adams Grammar School in Wem for a number of years.

== Social and family life ==
His father's career gave Stanier contacts with leading politicians of the day and with the British royal family. He was a close friend of the Duke of Windsor, and also with the Romanian and Greek Royal families. King George II of Greece became godfather to Stanier's son.

On 21 July 1927 Stanier married Dorothy Gladys, daughter of Brigadier-General Douglas Miller of Shotover Park, Wheatley, Oxfordshire. They had two children:

- Sylvia Mary Finola Stanier, 9 May 1928 – 12 October 2019.
- Sir Beville Douglas Stanier, 3rd Baronet, born 20 April 1934, educated at Eton and served in the Welsh Guards.

Sir Alexander Stanier died on 10 January 1995.

== Bibliography ==
- Major L. F. Ellis, "History of the Second World War, United Kingdom Military Series: Victory in the West", Vol I: "The Battle of Normandy", London: HM Stationery Office, 1962/Uckfield: Naval & Military, 2004, ISBN 1-845740-58-0.
- Major L. F. Ellis, "History of the Second World War, United Kingdom Military Series: Victory in the West", Vol II: "The Defeat of Germany", London: HM Stationery Office, 1968/Uckfield: Naval & Military, 2004, ISBN 1-845740-59-9.
- Joslen, H. F. (2003) [1960]. Orders of Battle: Second World War, 1939–1945. Uckfield, East Sussex: Naval and Military Press. ISBN 978-1-84342-474-1.

Baronetage of the United Kingdom
Preceded by Beville Stanier	Baronet (of Peplow Hall); 1921 – 1995	Succeeded by Beville Douglas Stanier
