= William Kenyon-Slaney =

British politician

The Right Honourable William Kenyon-Slaney PC
- Kenyon-Slaney in 1906

Member of Parliament for Newport (Shropshire)
- In office 1 July 1886 – 24 April 1908
- Preceded by: Robert Bickersteth
- Succeeded by: Beville Stanier

Personal details
- Born: William Slaney Kenyon; 24 August 1847 Rajkot, Gujarat, British India
- Died: 24 April 1908 (aged 60) Shifnal, Shropshire, England
- Resting place: St Andrew's Parish Churchyard, Ryton
- Party: Conservative
- Spouse: Mabel Selina Bridgeman (m. 1887)
- Children: Sybil; Robert
Association football career
- Position: Forward
Senior career*
| Years | Team | Apps | (Gls) |
- Oxford University
| ?–1873 | Wanderers | | |
| 1875–1876 | Old Etonians | | |
International career
| 1873 | England | 1 | (2) |
- * Club domestic league appearances and goals
- Cricket career

Cricket information
- Batting: Right-handed

Domestic team information
- Years: Team
- 1869 – 1880: Marylebone Cricket Club

Career statistics
| Competition | FC |
|---|---|
| Matches | 11 |
| Runs scored | 145 |
| Batting average | 10.35 |
| 100s/50s | 0/0 |
| Top score | 34 |
| Balls bowled | – |
| Wickets | – |
| Bowling average | – |
| 5 wickets in innings | – |
| 10 wickets in match | – |
| Best bowling | – |
| Catches/stumpings | 2/– |
- Source: Cricinfo

William Slaney Kenyon-Slaney PC (24 August 1847 – 24 April 1908) was an English sportsman, soldier and politician.

== Early life ==
Kenyon-Slaney was born on 24 August 1847 in Rajkot in Gujarat in British India. He was the son of Captain William Kenyon of the 2nd Bombay Cavalry and Frances Catherine Slaney, daughter of Robert Aglionby Slaney of Hatton Grange near Shifnal, Shropshire. Upon the death of Robert Slaney in 1862 the Kenyon family inherited the Slaney family estate of Hatton Grange and the Kenyon family name was changed to Kenyon-Slaney.

Kenyon-Slaney was educated at Eton College and briefly at Christ Church, Oxford, where he matriculated in 1865. In November 1867, he left Oxford and received a commission into the 3rd battalion of the Grenadier Guards.

== Career ==
Kenyon-Slaney was a noted sportsman and played first-class cricket for the Marylebone Cricket Club (MCC), as well as playing at county level for Shropshire between 1865 and 1879. He was also a keen association football player playing for Wanderers and was selected to play for England against Scotland in the second ever football international on 8 March 1873, where he scored two goals. Kenyon-Slaney became the first player to score in an international football match as the first international between the two nations in November the previous year had been a goalless draw.

He also took part for the Wanderers on the winning side in the 1873 FA Cup Final and on the losing side for the Old Etonians in the drawn first match of the 1875 Final and both matches of the 1876 Final.

In 1882 under the command of Sir Garnet Wolseley he took part in the Battle of Tel el-Kebir during the Urabi Revolt and was decorated for his efforts. In 1887 he was promoted to colonel and placed on half pay. He fully retired from the military in 1892.

After unsuccessfully contesting the Wellington division of Shropshire in the 1885 general election, Kenyon-Slaney was in 1886 elected to Parliament to represent the Newport division of Shropshire for the Conservative Party which he represented until his death in 1908.

== Personal life ==
On 22 February 1887, he married Lady Mabel Selina Bridgeman (1855–1933), daughter of Orlando Bridgeman, 3rd Earl of Bradford and the former Hon. Selina Weld-Forester (a daughter of the 1st Baron Forester), Together, they had two children:

- Sybil Agnes Kenyon-Slaney (1888–1970), who served as Lady-in-Waiting to The Princess Royal between 1923 and 1947.
- Robert Orlando Rodolph Kenyon-Slaney (1892–1965), who was High Sheriff of Shropshire in 1935; he married Lady Mary Cecilia Rhodesia Hamilton, a daughter of James Hamilton, 3rd Duke of Abercorn and Lady Rosalind Bingham, in 1917. They divorced in 1930, and he married Nesta Forestier-Walker, a daughter of Sir George Forestier-Walker, 3rd Baronet and Georgina Emily Chamberlain, in 1931.

Kenyon-Slaney died from an attack of gout on 24 April 1908. He was buried at St Andrew's Parish Churchyard, Ryton, Shropshire.

== See also ==
- List of England international footballers born outside England
- List of English cricket and football players

Parliament of the United Kingdom
| Preceded by Robert Bickersteth | Member of Parliament for Newport; 1886 – 1908 | Succeeded by Beville Stanier |
