= Fernanda Jacobsen =

Scottish humanitarian

Fernanda Jacobsen OBE was commandant of the Scottish Ambulance Unit (SAU) which provided humanitarian assistance in three convoys during the Spanish Civil War (1936–1939). She was appointed an Officer in the Order of the British Empire (OBE) for her work in Spain, which continued through the end of the war after the rest of the unit had returned home.

== Spanish Civil War ==
=== First Scottish Ambulance Unit ===
The Spanish Civil War broke out in July 1936 and Glasgow businessman Sir Daniel Macaulay Stevenson funded the creation of the Scottish Ambulance Unit to provide humanitarian help. Fernanda Jacobsen led the first unit of six ambulances and a lorry, with a crew of 19, which set out from Glasgow on 17 September 1936. Over the course of the war there were three such convoys, all led by Jacobsen.

In 1936 the ambulances helped transport the wounded during the retreat from Olias del Rey towards Illescas, Toledo. For their work on the front in Toledo, the SAU was nicknamed Los Brujos (The Wizards), but the unit lost seven crew, all returned to Scotland. Five of the seven were deported by British authorities, accused of looting, including stealing from dead soldiers. The convoy returned home in December 1936 and was praised by Anthony Eden. Jacobsen estimated that the SAU had treated 2,500 wounded and transported 1,000 evacuees.

=== Second and third convoys ===
In November 1936, Jacobsen had been able to persuade the Labour movement to provide some funding, over the objections of some in the Scottish Labour Party. In January 1937 a second convoy, again led by Jacobsen, travelled to Spain. The second SAU expedition focused its efforts on the capital, which was suffering from the bombardment of the Siege of Madrid. Their work was enthusiastically praised in Politica, a newspaper in Madrid. After months of working to evacuate the wounded and provide relief, under pressure from bombings, the second convoy returned in July, to be replaced by a third convoy in September.

In January 1938, Jacobsen complained that three volunteers who had been sent to join the second convoy were more concerned with promoting Communism and had even decorated one of the ambulances with a picture of Vladimir Lenin. The three had left the SAU to join the Spanish Medical Aid Committee and thereafter returned to Glasgow where they were making allegations about the SAU, causing donations to drop off. Jacobsen wanted to speak to Major-General Sir Walter Maxwell-Scott, founder of Scottish Friends of National Spain, to address the issue. Four members in all had left to join the Spanish Medical Aid Committee in March 1937 in opposition to Jacobsen's view that the SAU should remain in Madrid if it were to become surrounded—something Stevenson had instructed against—and complaining that she was not co-operating enough with government authorities.

At that time, the critical problem in Madrid was a lack of food. The possibility of evacuating Madrid was being considered, but Jacobsen was not sure if that would be possible. Conditions in Madrid continued to be very serious and in August 1938, after the other members of the third convoy had returned to Scotland in July, Jacobsen, who had remained behind, appealed for contributions in The Guardian, saying of the people there that "Weakened as they are by malnutrition, not to say starvation, without fuel, without the necessaries of life, the coming of winter is to many of them a sentence of death." The appeal was successful and Jacobsen was able to open two porridge canteens in January 1939 to provide food to the starving of Madrid. Jacobsen and her ambulance unit were visited by Joseph P. Kennedy Jr., whose father was then ambassador of the United States to the UK, in February. She continued to run the two canteens throughout the war but after the victory of Francisco Franco in April 1939 one of these was taken by the Falangist relief organisation Auxilio Social, to her fury. Her work continued beyond the end of the war, and she returned to Scotland in August 1939.

== Political views ==
Jacobsen was an active member of the Liberal Party and supported the Spanish Government. She was insistent that the work of the ambulance unit should be humanitarian, not political, and should help anyone who needed it, regardless of allegiance, but her approach caused opposition from some Communists and led to allegations from them that she was a Fascist sympathiser. It may be that she did use SAU vehicles to smuggle some Fascist supporters out of Madrid, and perceptions were not helped by the fact that Macauley Stevenson, the founder of the SAU, accepted the cross of the Order of the German Eagle, first class, awarded to him by Adolf Hitler in 1937 for work years earlier setting up student exchange programs between Scotland and Germany. In her Guardian appeal of 1938 the work of the SAU is described as being "to relieve the suffering and wounded, those who are fighting, those who, though not fighting are bombed all the same, those who are merely destitute and wretched through the war."

== Personal description ==
Sir H. V. Tewson, then Vice-Chairman of the Basque Children's Committee and later General Secretary of the Trades Union Congress, wrote in a memorandum of an interview with Jacobsen that she "struck me as being a shrewd and capable person, exceedingly enthusiastic in her work." Priscilla Scott-Ellis (daughter of Thomas Scott-Ellis, 8th Baron Howard de Walden and later wife of José Luis de Vilallonga) wrote in her diary that Jacobsen was "An incredible woman, small and square, with a huge bottom. She always dresses in a kilt, thick woollen stockings, brogues, a khaki jacket of military cut with thistles all over it, huge leather gauntlet gloves, a cape also with thistles, and, the crowning glory, a little black Scottish hat edged with tartan and with a large silver badge on it." An anonymous letter from "A Spaniard" in The Guardian, December 1938, noted that Jacobsen's Glengarry cap had become well-known and that her kilt was of Clan MacAulay tartan in honour of Sir Daniel Macaulay Stevenson.

== Recognition ==
Jacobsen was made an OBE in the May 1937 Coronation Honours for her continuing work with the Scottish Ambulance Service in Spain. She received gifts from many people in Spain and one of these, a tortoiseshell and paper hand fan, is displayed at the Kelvingrove Art Gallery and Museum in Glasgow. In 1961, Jacobsen ceremonially opened the University of Glasgow Stevenson Physical Education Building in 1961, which was named in honour of Sir Daniel Macaulay Stevenson.

== See also ==
- Scottish volunteers in the Spanish Civil War
