= Beville Stanier =

British politician

Belville Stanier

Member of Parliament for Newport, Shropshire
- In office 1908–1918
- Preceded by: William Kenyon-Slaney
- Succeeded by: Constituency abolished

Member of Parliament for Ludlow
- In office 1918–1921
- Preceded by: Rowland Hunt
- Succeeded by: Ivor Windsor-Clive

Personal details
- Born: 12 June 1867 Ambleside, Lancashire, England
- Died: 15 December 1921 (aged 54)
- Party: Unionist
- Spouse: Constance Gibbons (m. 1894)
- Children: 4, including Alexander
- Education: Royal Agricultural College
- Military career
- Branch: Territorial Reserve
- Rank: Captain
- Conflicts: World War I

Sir Beville Stanier, 1st Baronet (12 June 1867 – 15 December 1921), was a British politician and landowner.

== Biography ==
Stanier was born in Ambleside, Lancashire, in 1867, the son of Francis Stanier and Caroline Stanier, sister of General William Clive Justice (1835–1908). He was educated privately then studied at the Royal Agricultural College in Cirencester, and in 1894 married Constance Gibbons, daughter of the Reverend Benjamin Gibbons. They had four children, including Alexander Stanier, a prominent Army officer. Stanier farmed a 4,000-hectare estate at Peplow Hall, Shropshire, which had been purchased by his father in the 1870s, and in 1907 was President of the Shropshire Chamber of Agriculture

He entered public life in 1902, as a member of Shropshire County Council, holding this post until 1912, and in 1907 was also a member of Market Drayton Rural District Council. Following the death of the incumbent William Kenyon-Slaney, Stanier was elected as a Unionist Member of Parliament for Newport, Shropshire, in a 1908 by-election. He held the seat until the 1918 general election, when at same time the Newport constituency was abolished and he replaced the retiring Rowland Hunt in Ludlow. He remained the MP for Ludlow until his death, aged 54, in 1921. He was created a baronet in the 1917 Birthday Honours.

During the First World War, Stanier held the rank of captain in the Territorial Reserve, and served as the honorary secretary of the Shropshire Territorial Association, the body that administered military units raised in the county. At the start of the war in 1914, he took on the annual post of treasurer of the Royal Salop Infirmary in Shrewsbury when their preferred candidate had been mobilized to serve abroad. His baronetcy was conferred at recommendation of Prime Minister David Lloyd George for organising wartime sugar beet production.

Stanier was the deputy chairman of the North Staffordshire Railway and the Trent and Mersey Canal, a director of the Farmers' Land Purchase Company and Home Grown Sugar. He was also chairman of the British Sugar Beet Growers' Society and a governor of Harper Adams Agricultural College, and until a few years before his death was proprietor of the Shrewsbury Chronicle as well as the Newport and Market Drayton Advertiser newspapers. He was a keen field sportsman, who shot big game in the British Colonies, adding to a taxidermy collection at Peplow Hall that was begun by his father.

Stanier sold the Peplow estate early in 1921, when he moved to The Citadel at Hawkstone Park, where he died later that year. He was buried at nearby Hodnet parish church. Lady Constance Stanier died in 1948.

Parliament of the United Kingdom
Preceded by William Kenyon-Slaney	Member of Parliament for Newport, Shropshire; 1908–1918	Constituency abolished
Preceded by Rowland Hunt	Member of Parliament for Ludlow; 1918–1921	Succeeded by Ivor Windsor-Clive
Baronetage of the United Kingdom
New creation	Baronet of Peplow Hall; 1917–1921	Succeeded by Alexander Stanier
