= Alexander Stevenson (Scottish politician) =

Sir Alexander Stewart Stevenson JP DL (9 April 1860 – 24 May 1936) was a Scottish councillor and a lay preacher.

== Life ==
Alexander Stevenson was born on 9 April 1860 at Dalry, Ayrshire, Scotland. His family moved and he was educated at Grange School, Bo'ness, in West Lothian. He became a jeweller and watchmaker and entered Edinburgh Town Council as a Liberal in 1900. He was Convener of the Electricity Committee 1904–1906 and 1909–1915; Magistrate 1906–1909; City Treasurer 1922–1925; and Lord Provost 1926–1929.

He was created a Knight Bachelor on 16 February 1928 at Buckingham Palace. In 1929 he was awarded an honorary LLD by the University of Edinburgh at the same ceremony as the German theologian Albert Schweitzer was also awarded an honorary degree. On 28 November 1929 he was appointed Deputy Lieutenant of the City and County of the City of Edinburgh.

With his father James Stevenson (1824–1887) having been a missionary with the Scottish Coast Mission it was natural that he was a lay-preacher with the Grassmarket Mission in the Leamington Terrace Church in Edinburgh, the first Scottish United Church, which later became the Bruntsfield Church.

Twice capped as a Scottish international bowls player, he was part of Rink 3 in the first ever international competition between England, Scotland, Ireland and Wales. This took place on 13th, 14th, and 15 July 1903, on the Crystal Palace and Wandsworth Greens, London. Although tied on points, England beat Scotland on shots.

He died in Edinburgh on 24 May 1936.

== Legacy ==
A number of streets in Edinburgh were named after him in the area which he represented on the council:

- Stevenson Road (10 September 1926)
- Stevenson Avenue (5 May 1927)
- Stevenson Drive (21 October 1927)
- Stevenson Terrace (18 October 1934)
- Stevenson Grove (29 April 1937)

== Political Relatives ==
- John Keith McBroom Laird (1907-1985) Canadian Senator - 1st cousin, twice removed
- James Stevenson, 1st Baron Stevenson (1873-1926) Member of House of Lords - Nephew
- Stewart Stevenson (1946- ) Member of the Scottish Parliament - Great Nephew
