= John Keith McBroom Laird =

Canadian politician

The Honourable John Keith McBroom Laird

Canadian Senator from Ontario
- In office 1967–1982
- Appointed by: Lester B. Pearson

Personal details
- Born: January 12, 1907 Blenheim, Ontario, Canada
- Died: November 12, 1985 (aged 78)
- Party: Liberal
- Committees: Chair, Standing Committee on Internal Economy, Budgets and Administration (1974-1979)

John Keith McBroom Laird (12 January 1907 – 12 November 1985) was a Canadian author, barrister, and solicitor. He was a member of the Canadian Liberal Party, a well-known tax lawyer in Windsor, and a law partner of Paul Martin, Sr., who was the father of Prime Minister Paul Martin.

== Political career ==
He served as Senator for Windsor, Ontario in the Federal Parliament from 6 April 1967 until 12 January 1982.

== Personal life ==
Laird was born in Blenheim, Ontario, Canada.

== Political relatives ==
- Sir Alexander Stevenson (1860–1936) Edinburgh Lord Provost - 1st cousin, twice removed
- Lord James Stevenson (1873–1926) Member of House of Lords - 2nd cousin, once removed
- Stewart Stevenson (born 1946) Member of the Scottish Parliament - 3rd cousin
