= 1908 Newport by-election =

UK Parliamentary by-election

The 1908 Newport (Shropshire) by-election was held on 14 May 1908. The by-election was held due to the death of the incumbent Conservative MP, William Kenyon-Slaney. It was won by the Conservative candidate Beville Stanier.

Newport by-election, 1908
Party	Candidate	Votes	%	±%
Conservative	Beville Stanier	5,328	54.9	+4.0
Liberal	Francis Neilson	4,377	45.1	−4.0
Majority		951	9.8	+8.0
Turnout		9,705	89.9	+1.5
Conservative hold		Swing	+4.0	
