= Asnelles =

- Commune
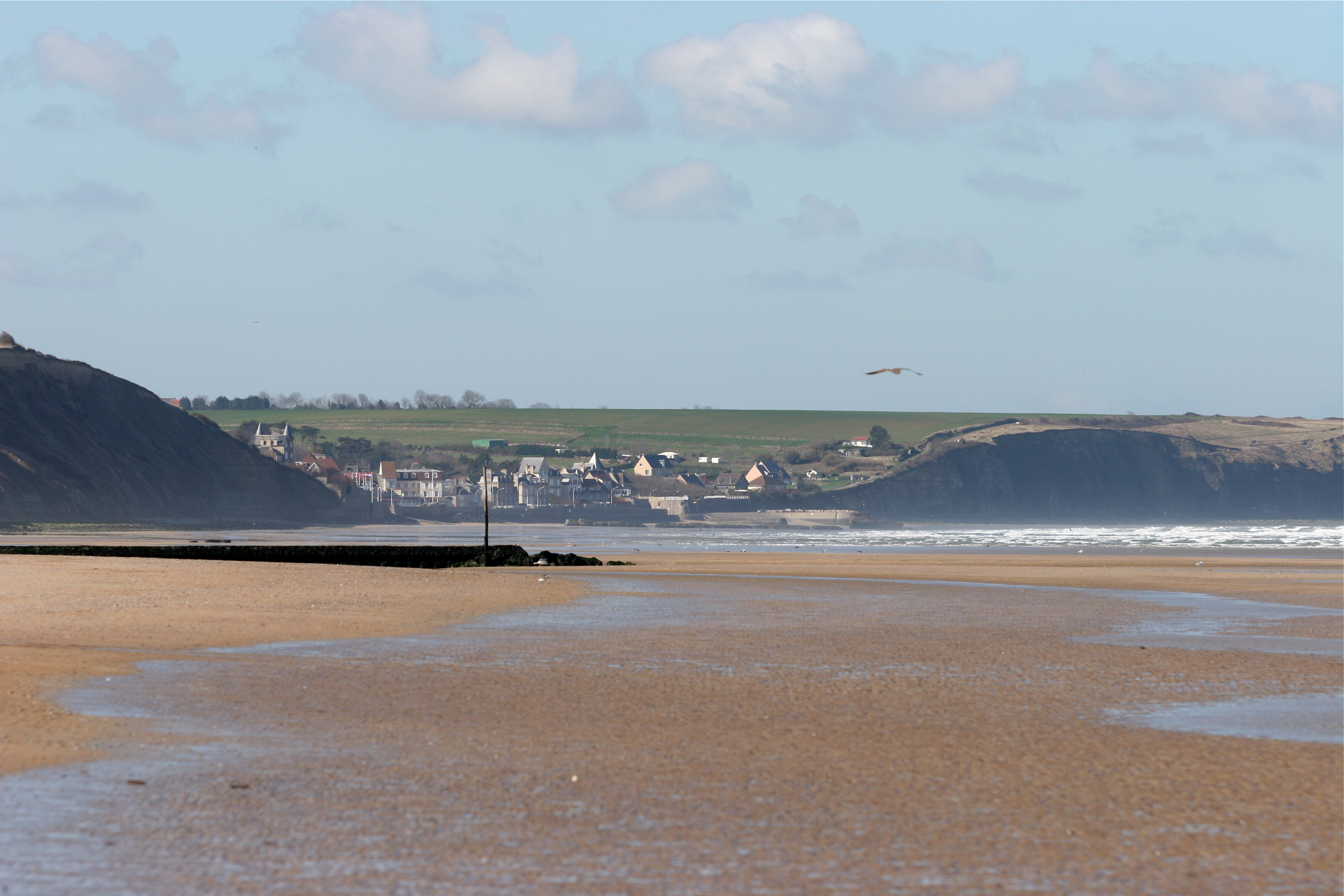
- View of the beach

- Coat of arms
- Location of Asnelles
- Location within France Location within Normandy
- Coordinates: 49°20′18″N 0°34′58″W
- Country: France
- Region: Normandy
- Department: Calvados
- Arrondissement: Bayeux
- Canton: Courseulles-sur-Mer
- Intercommunality: CC Seulles Terre Mer

Government
  - Mayor (2020–2026): Alain Scribe
- Area^{1}: 2.52 km^{2} (0.97 sq mi)
- Elevation: 6 m (20 ft)
- Highest elevation: 21 m (69 ft)
- Lowest elevation: 1 m (3.3 ft)
- Population (2023): 642
  - Density: 255/km^{2} (660/sq mi)
- Time zone: UTC+01:00 (CET)
  - Summer (DST): UTC+02:00 (CEST)
- INSEE/Postal code: 14022 /14960
- ^{1} French Land Register data, which excludes lakes, ponds, glaciers > 1 km^{2} (0.386 sq mi or 247 acres) and river estuaries.

Asnelles (French pronunciation: [anɛl]) is a commune in the Calvados department in the Normandy region of north-western France.

== Geography ==
Asnelles is located at the seaside some 13 km north-east of Bayeux and 10 west of Courseulles-sur-Mer. Access to the commune is by the D514 road from Saint-Côme-de-Fresné in the west passing through the town and continuing to Ver-sur-Mer in the east. The D65 road from Arromanches to Meuvaines passes through the south of the commune. The D65A links the D514 to the D65. A large part of the commune is residential with the sea shore fully urban but some 50% of the commune is farmland.

The Gronde river passes through the heart of the commune from south to north emptying into the English Channel.

== History ==
Tradition says that William the Conqueror, to escape his pursuers and after having taken refuge at the house of Baron Hubert de Ryes, regained his ducal castle by following small sunken pathways including one that now bears the name of Sente au Bâtard (Sente the Bastard). This footpath is difficult in places and it crosses the Gronde, bypassing part of the village, and leads to old farmhouses and old stone houses at Creully.

The name Asnelles (from the Latin asinellas meaning "little donkeys") appears for the first time in an official document at the end of the 12th century when work began on the early church dedicated to St. Martin. At that time a market for donkeys stood in the field opposite the church near the public square "planître". The coastline was then a large swamp which often caused fevers: people would implore the protection of Saint Honorine in a small chapel built on the ruins of a Gallo-Roman Villa which would be located near the modern cemetery.

Until the end of the 17th century there was a small harbour at the mouth of the Gronde called Port Heurtault which had nearly 2,000 boat movements per year of boats involved in coastal shipping or Cabotage. The port was silted up by a storm, so that the Amirauté Court or Maritime Court, which was created in 1554 at Asnelles, was transferred to Bayeux. During the 18th century, Asnelles was the seat of a Captainerie (Official residence of the officer of the port) and a coastal militia was responsible for monitoring the sea and reporting the approach of any English ship.

In the middle of the 19th century the village underwent major changes. Under the leadership of the Mayor, Dr. Théodore Labbey, significant work was undertaken including: the draining of marshes, the construction of a Levee, and many large houses - some of which remain today. Asnelles becomes Asnelles-la-Belle-Plage, a name given by many swimmers at the beach which took the appearance of a "small Trouville", according to the newspapers of the time, with its casino and its up-market hotels. The beach resort was served by the Chemins de fer du Calvados (Railways of Calvados) from 1899 to 1932. The construction of a Preventorium for children with tuberculosis who had a parent working at the SNCF was imposed on the commune in 1926. Until the eve of the Second World War it accommodated more than 1,500 boys and girls.

On D-Day 6 June 1944, British soldiers landed at Asnelles: the 231st Infantry Brigade was commanded by General Sir Alexander Stanier. The village was liberated in the afternoon with heavy losses mainly due to a 77 mm cannon which covered all the beach on the eastern side. On 10 June the Advanced Landing Ground (ALG) "ALG B-1" was operational at Asnelles-sur-Mer off Gold Beach, the first Allied airfield on the continent, operating Supermarine Spitfires.

Immediately after the landing the construction of the Mulberry harbour at Arromanches began of which the eastern part was at Asnelles consisting of the Phoenix caissons which enclosed the port on the eastern side starting from the commune beach.

The spokesman of General de Gaulle, who was one of the "Voices of France", Maurice Schumann also landed at Asnelles. He now is buried in the nearby cemetery of Calvary. The village recovered slowly from the D-Day operations: many large houses were severely damaged or destroyed: the Levee and the holds suffered greatly and many roads had to be rebuilt. There were however no civilian casualties reported.

Today, economic activity in Asnelles is mainly tourism with many second homes, camping, a leisure park, cottages, and family homes.

=== Heraldry ===
Arms of Asnelles	Blazon: Azure, a bark of Gules issuant from dexter, sailed in Argent and sailing on a rough Ocean in base, at sinister chief a mullet of Or radiant towards base.

== Administration ==
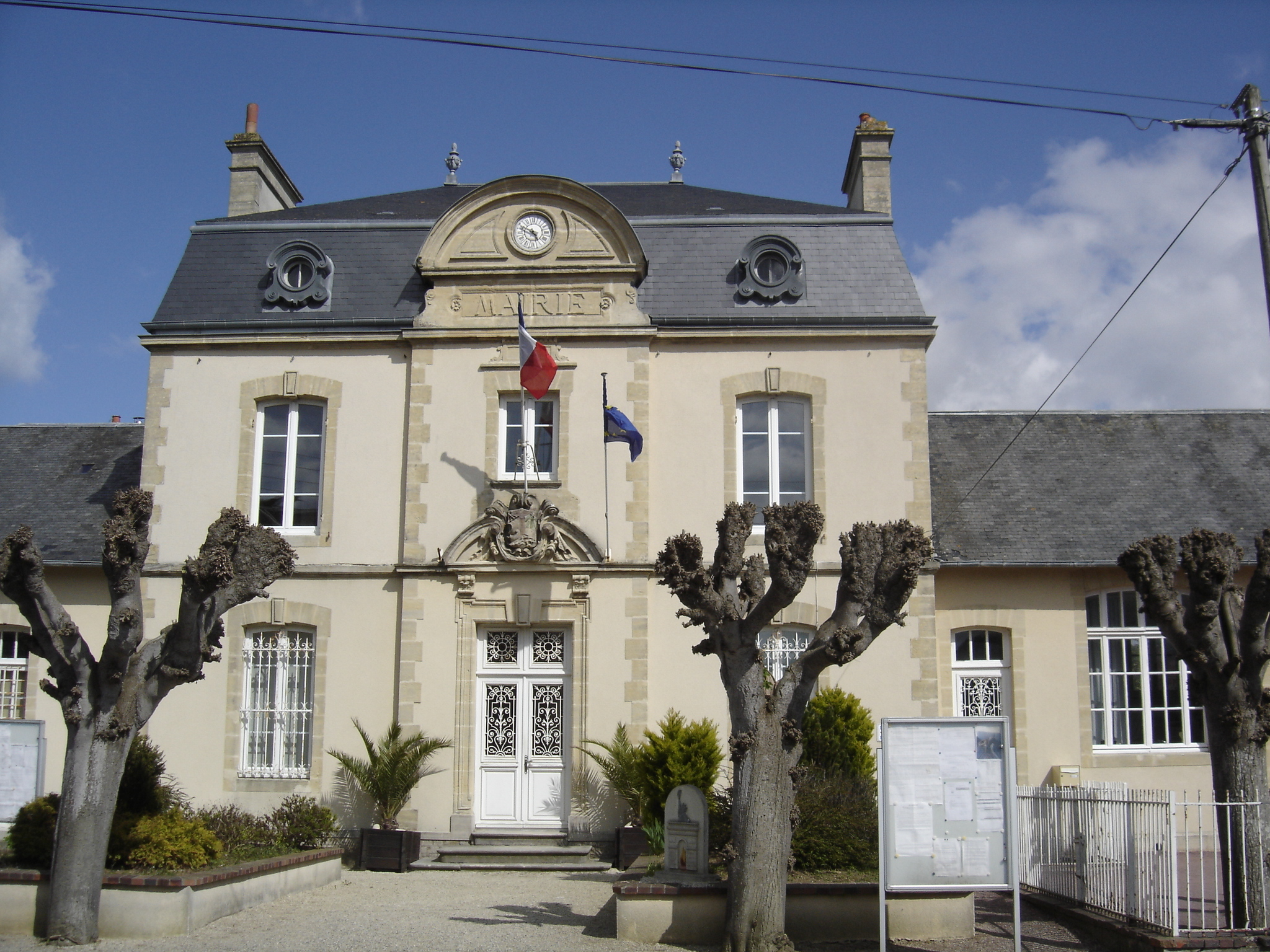
The Town Hall

List of Successive Mayors

From	To	Name	Party	Position
	2001	Emmanuel Deneffle		
2001	2001	Jean-Pierre Malo		Chemical Engineer
2001	2026	Alain Scribe		Retired marketing consultant

The municipal council is composed of 15 members with 4 deputy mayors.

=== Twinning ===
Asnelles has twinning associations with:

- Charmouth (United Kingdom) since 1985.

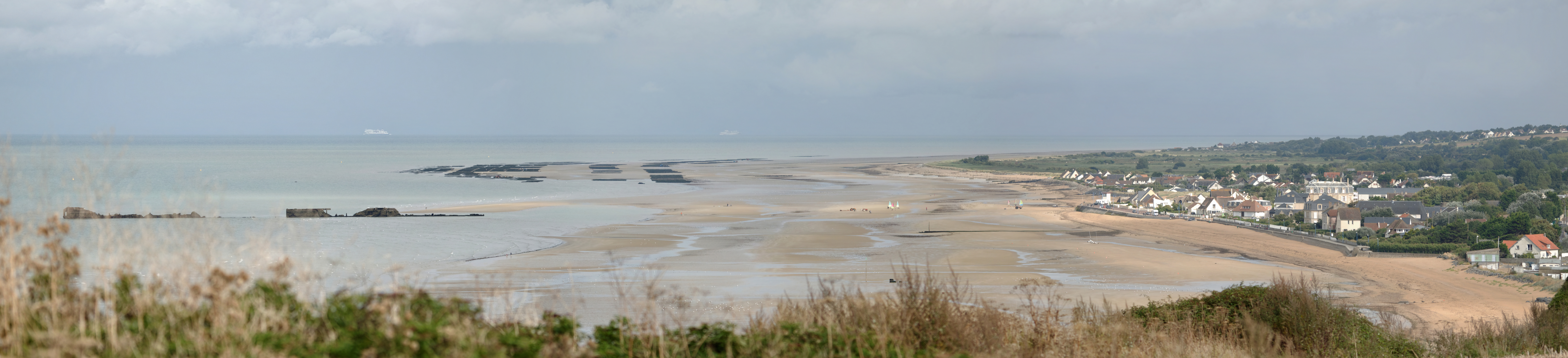
Panoramic view of Asnelles

== Demography ==
The inhabitants of the commune are known as Asnellois or Asnelloises in French.

Historical population

Year	Pop.	±% p.a.
1793	407	—
1821	408	+0.01%
1846	448	+0.37%
1872	414	−0.30%
1901	407	−0.06%
1926	243	−2.04%
1946	323	+1.43%
1962	303	−0.40%
1968	267	−2.09%

Year	Pop.	±% p.a.
1975	284	+0.89%
1982	334	+2.34%
1990	478	+4.58%
1999	571	+1.99%
2007	588	+0.37%
2012	589	+0.03%
2017	595	+0.20%
2023	642	+1.28%

Source: EHESS and INSEE

== Economy ==
Asnelles is a beach resort located on the Côte de Nacre. It has a beautiful sandy beach which is adjacent to the Arromanches beach. It also has a land sailing club. Asnelle is located on the Circuit of the landing beaches in Normandy. The commune has created a hiking trail called La Sente au Bâtard in honour of William the Conqueror.

== Culture and heritage ==
=== Civil heritage ===
Asnelles has many buildings and structures that are classified as historical monuments as well as other points of interest that are not registered. They are:

- Farmhouse at 19 Rue de la Cavée (1782)
- Lavoir (Public laundry) at Rue du Débarquement (19th century)
- Chateau at 1 Rue du Débarquement (18th century)
- Maison le Mesnil at 2 Rue du Débarquement (18th century)
- House at 12-14 Rue de l'Eglise (17th century)
- Farmhouse at 36 Rue de l'Eglise (19th century)
- Abri Sainte-Thérèse House at 8 Rue de l'Eglise (19th century)
- House at 12 Rue du Front de Mar (1945)
- Villa Cosson (Les Tourelles) at 15 Route de la Libération (19th century)
- Villa Neptune at 17 Route de la Libération (19th century)
- Villa les Tamaris (Centre Fernand Leconte) at 21 Route de la Libération (19th century)
- Villa Carrée at 23 Route de la Libération (1874)
- Stone Bridge at Rue Paul Hélaine (1846)
- House at 2 Rue des Pérelles (19th century)
- Fire Station at Rue de Southampton (1873)
- Commerce House at 17 Rue de Southampton (19th century)
- Château d'Asnelles at 42 Rue de Southampton (19th century)
- House at 53 Rue de Southampton (1958)
- Beach defence battery (1942)
- Tithe Barn (14th century)
- Town Hall, Post Office, and Primary School (19th century)
- Village (12th-19th centuries)
- Houses and Hotels (16th - 20th century)
- Phoenix Caissons (offshore), were used for building Levees and jetties for the Mulberry harbour after the landings and for Bunkers on the coast.
- Sente au Bâtard (walking path) (William the Conqueror passed there according to legend).
- The Biscuit Factory famous for their Shortbread of Asnelles
- La Gronde river
- Seaweed beach
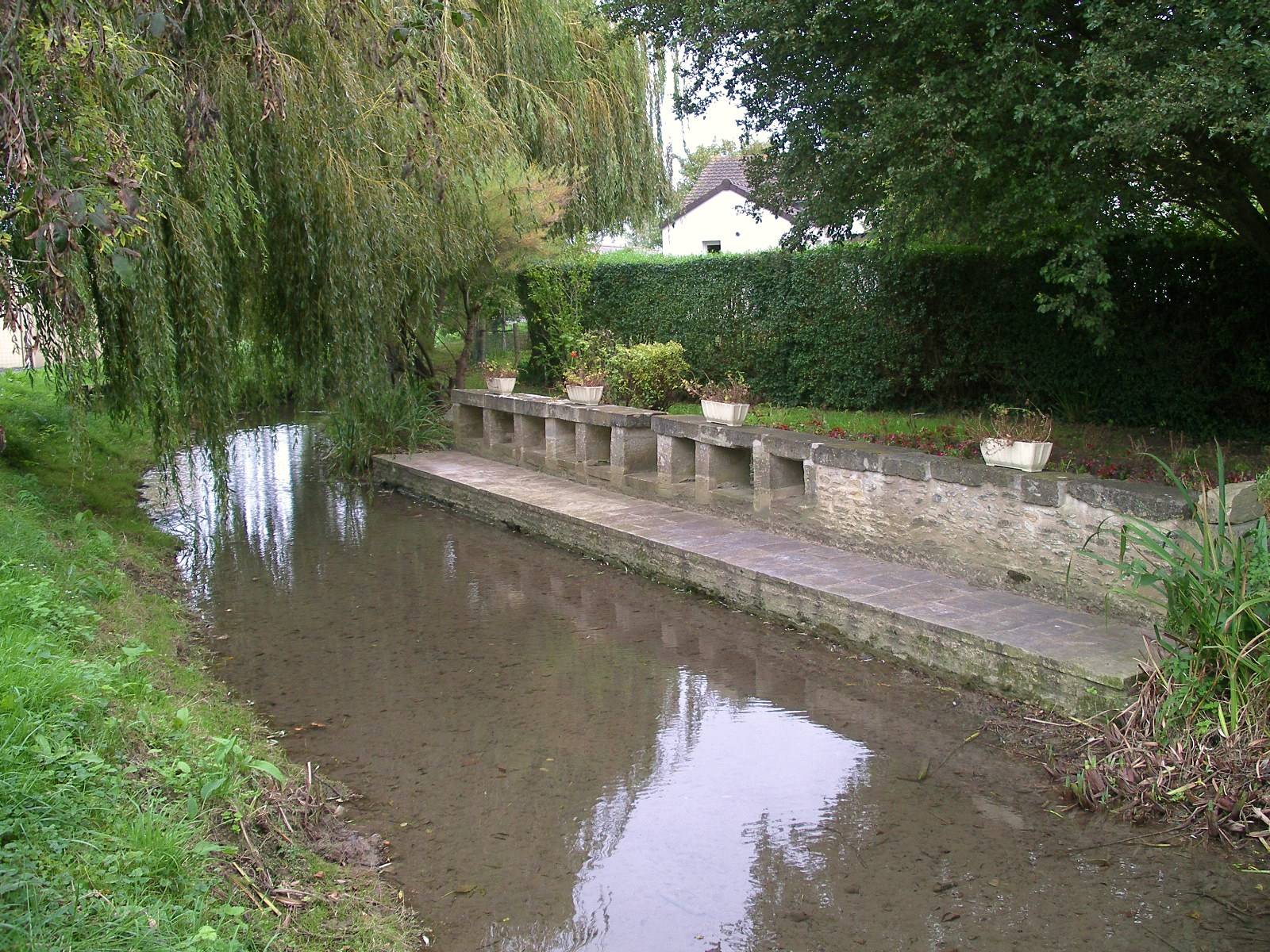
The Lavoir (Public laundry)

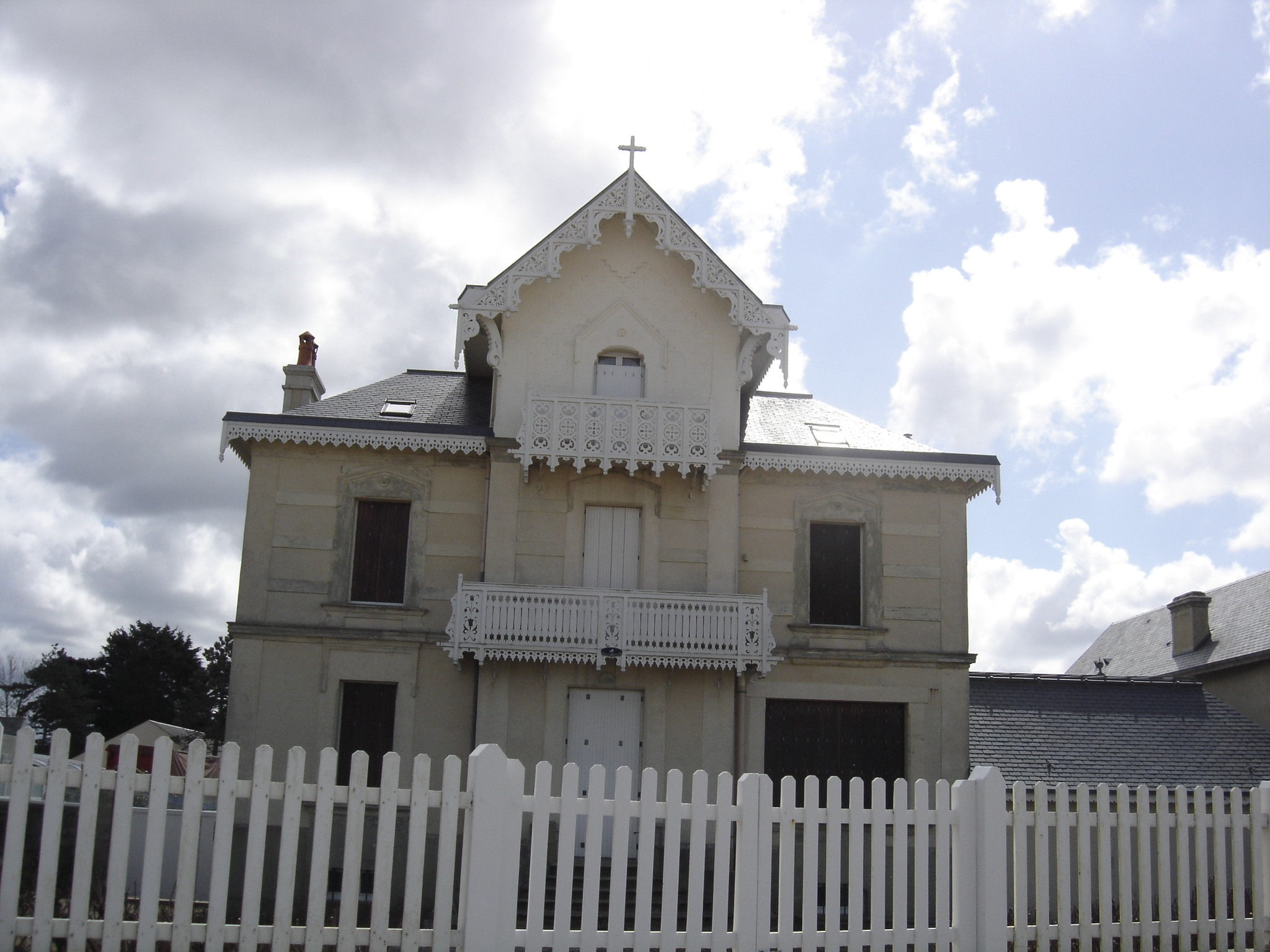
Villa Neptune

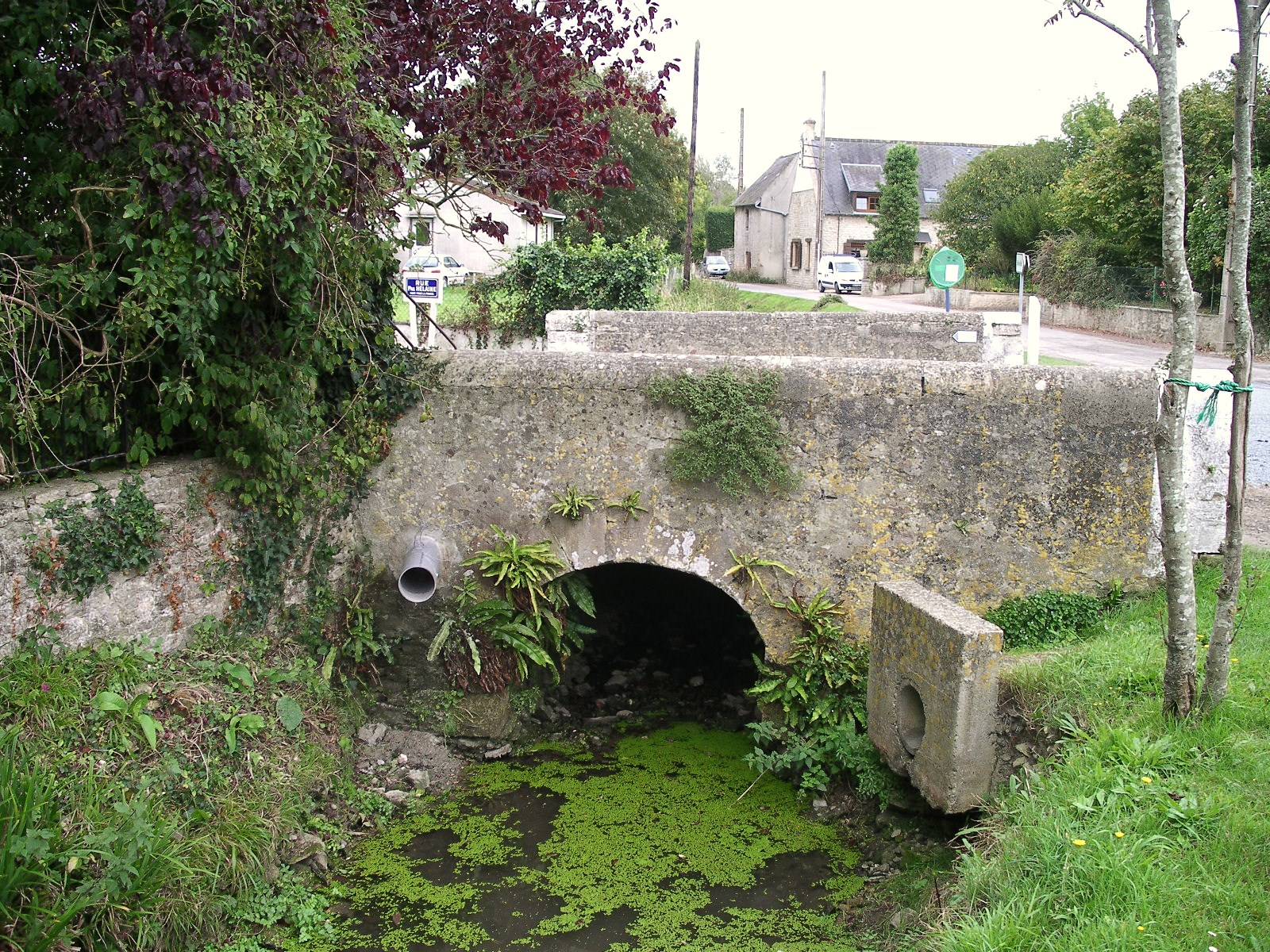
The Stone Bridge

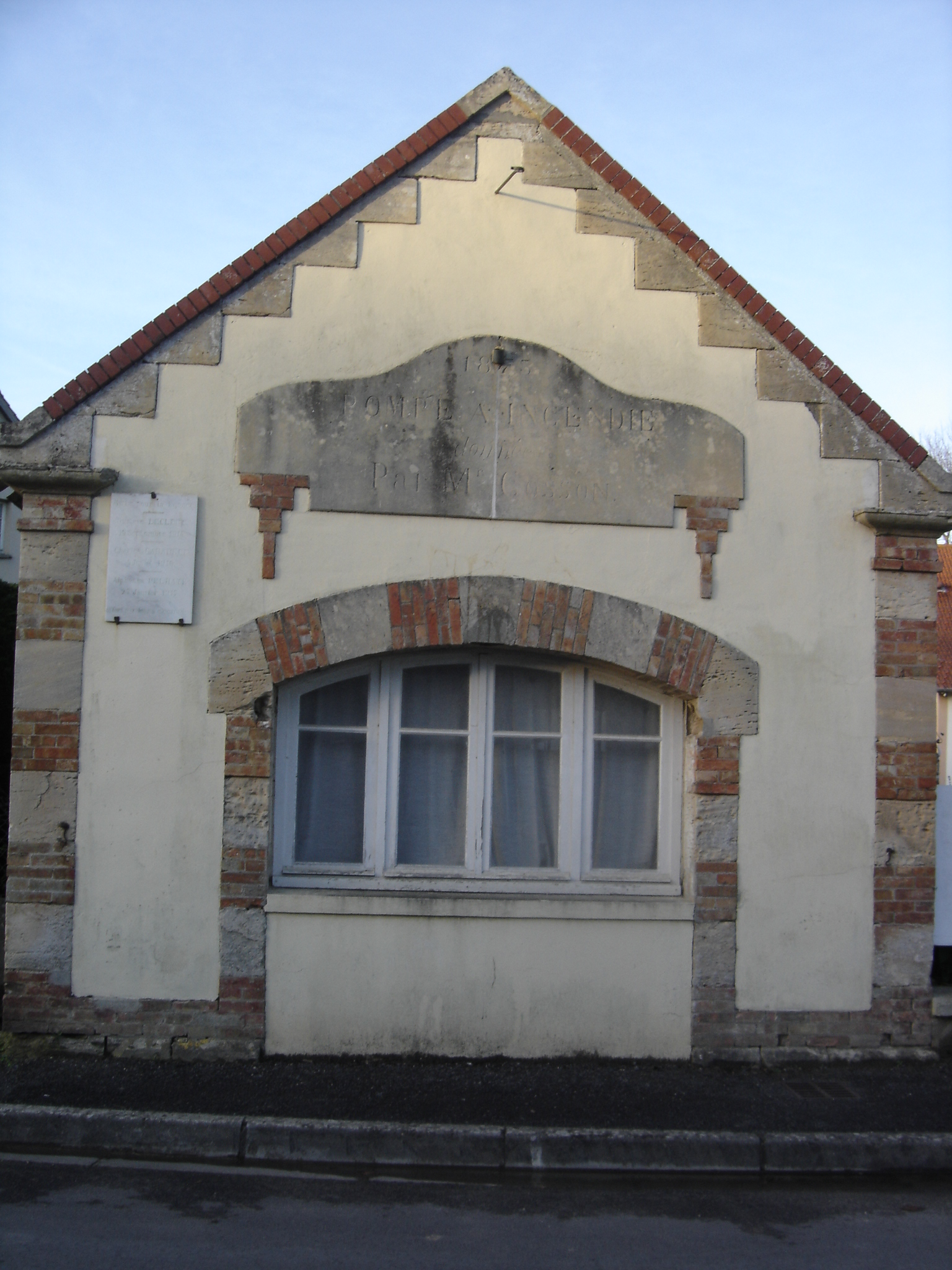
The Fire Station

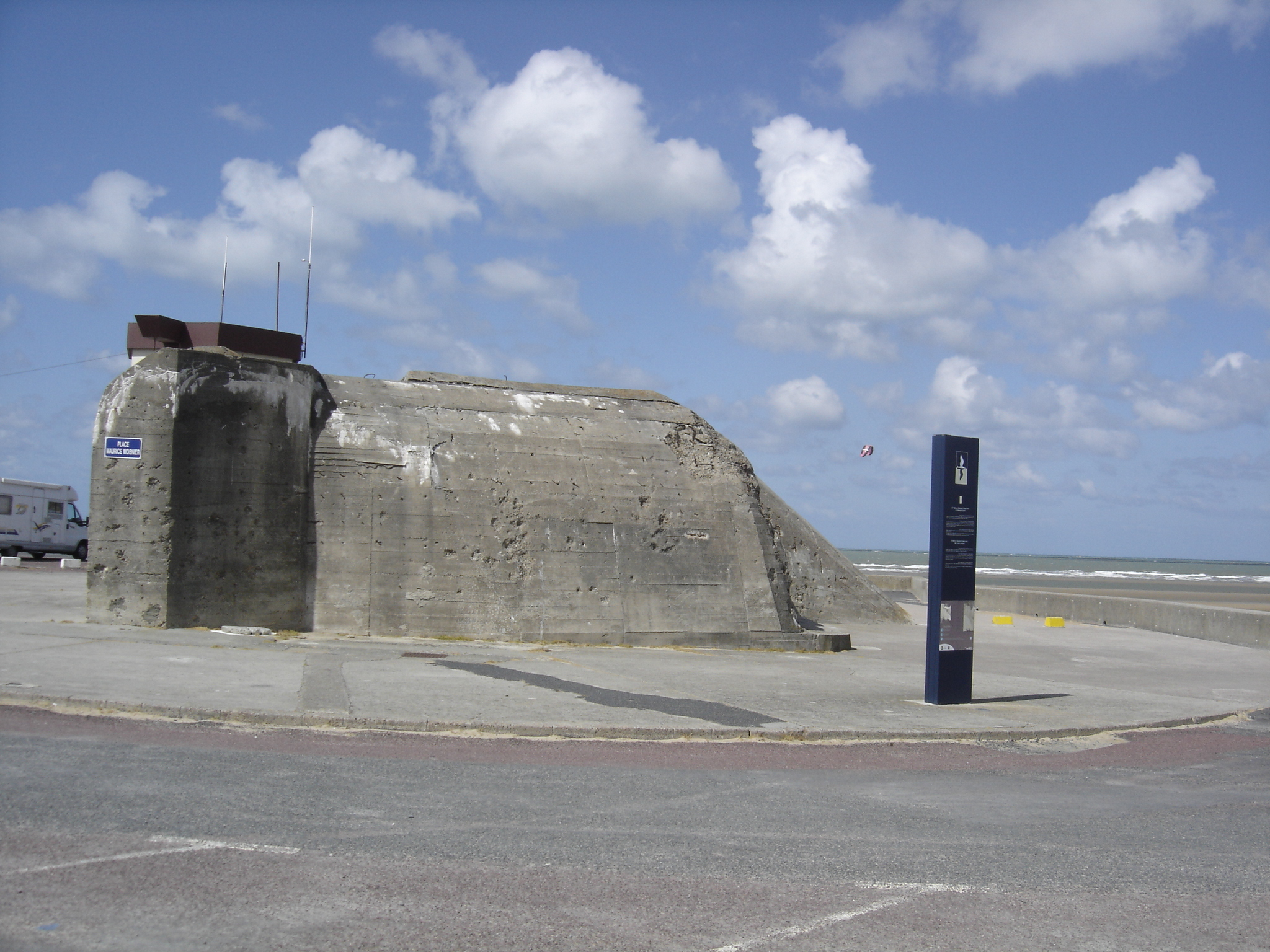
The Beach defence battery

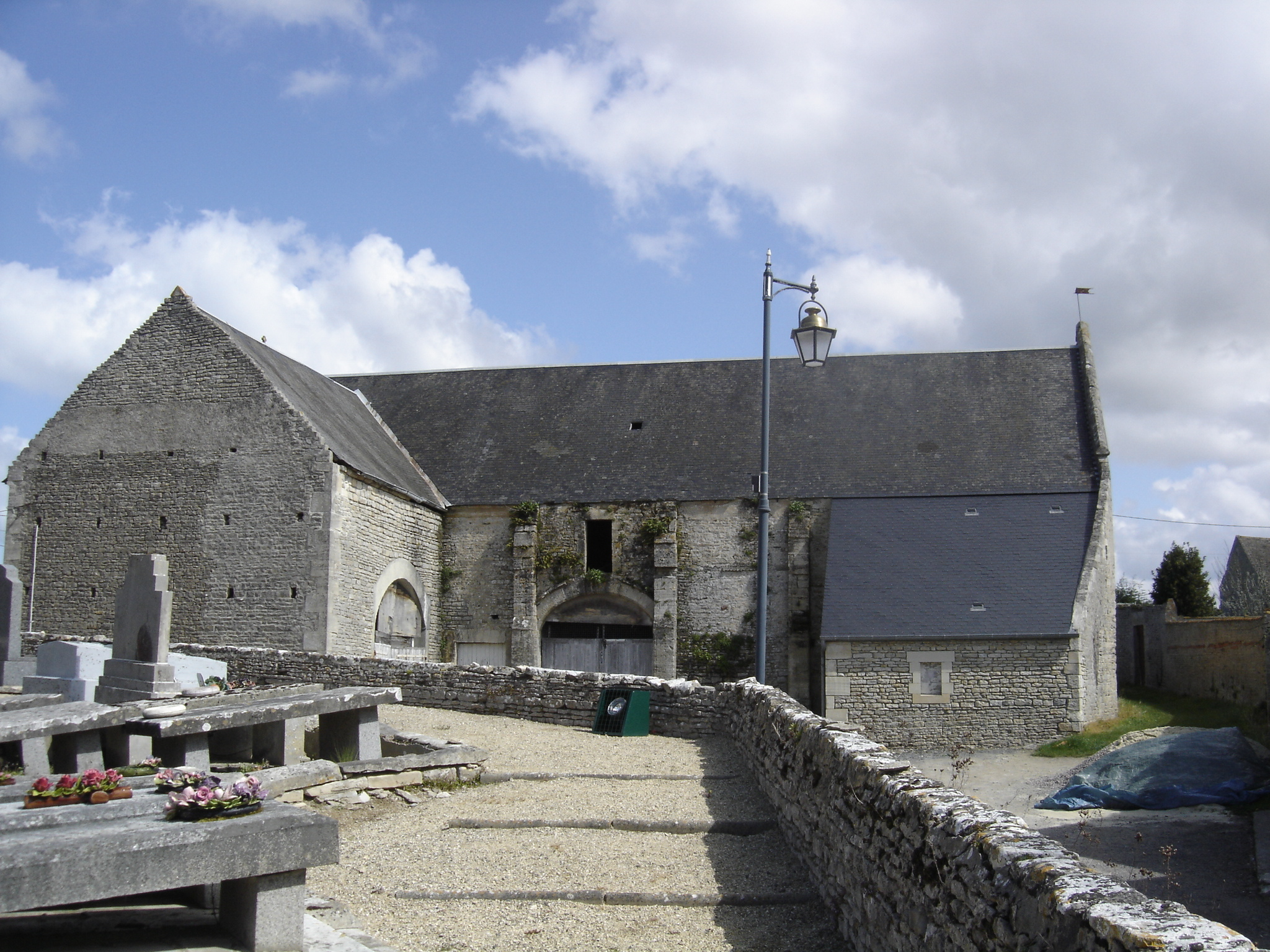
The tithe barn

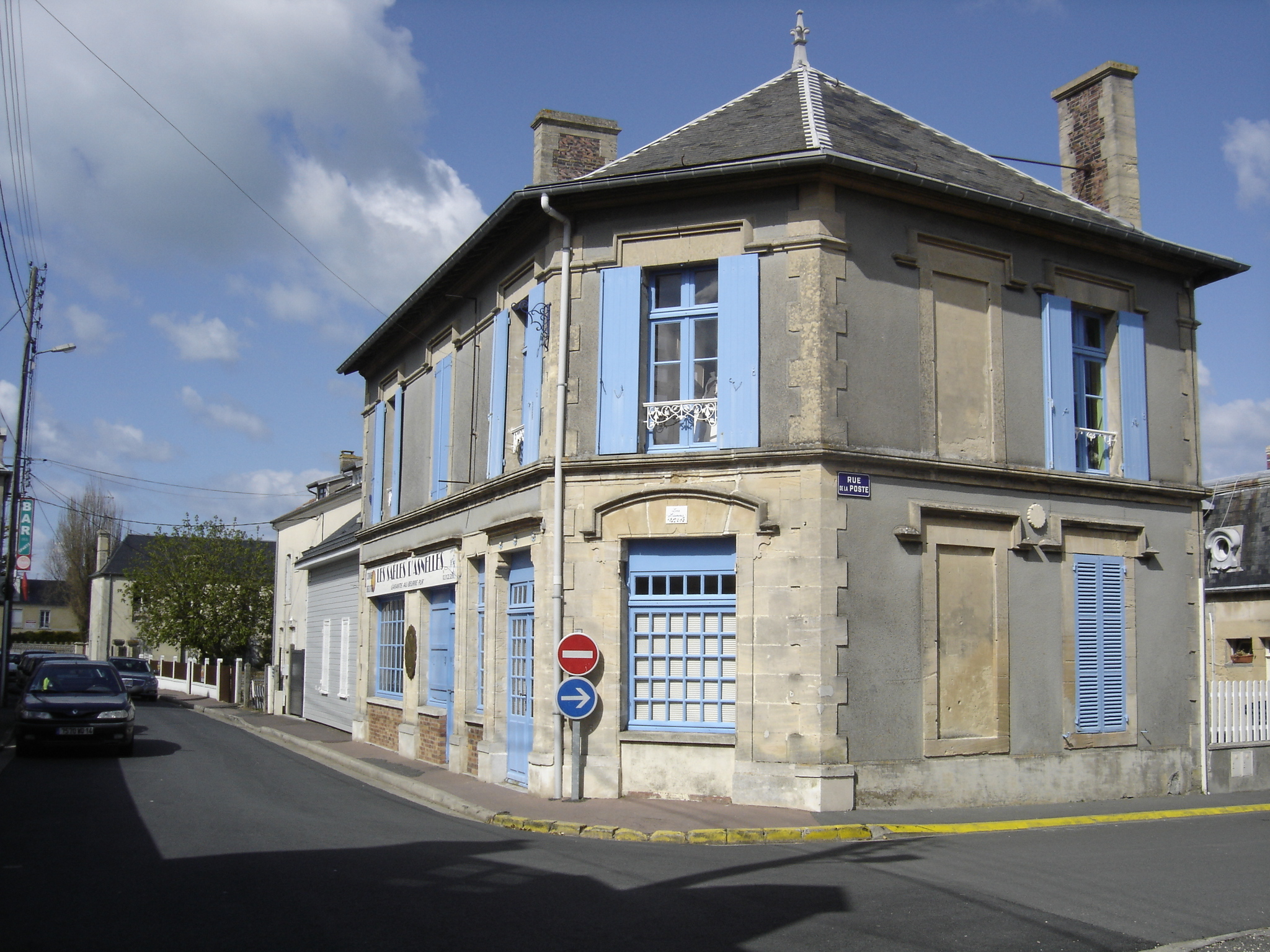
The Biscuit Factory

=== Religious heritage ===
A number of religious buildings and structures have been registered as historical monuments. These are:

- Presbytery (18th century)
- Monumental Cross at Rue de Southampton (19th century)
- Parish Church of Saint-Martin (12th century)

The Church of Saint Martin contains many items which are registered as historical objects. These are:

- A Chasuble (ornamented in gold) (19th century)
- 2 Copes (ornamented in rose) (19th century)
- A Cope (ornamented in rose) (19th century)
- A Cope (ornamented in violet) (19th century)
- 2 Candlesticks (torches) (18th & 19th centuries)
- 2 Candelabra (19th century)
- A Candlestick (torch) (19th century)
- A Ciborium for the sick (19th & 20th centuries)
- 2 Ciboriums (19th & 20th centuries)
- A Ciborium (19th century)
- A Paten (19th century)
- 4 Altar Candlesticks (19th century)
- 3 Chalices with patens (19th century)
- A Chalice with paten (19th century)
- A Chalice with paten (19th century)
- A Chalice (19th century)
- A Statue: Saint Pierre (19th century)
- A Statue: Notre-Dame des flots (17th century)
- 2 Altars, Retables, and Tabernacles (Secondary Altars) (19th century)
- A Painting: Annunciation (18th century)
- A Retable (18th century)
- The Main Altar with Retable (17th & 19th centuries)
- A Stained glass window (20th century)
- A Stained glass window: Notre-Dame des flots (1931)
- A Hagiographic Stained glass window: Charity of Saint Martin (19th century)
- A Figurative Stained glass window: Bon Pasteur (19th century)
- 7 Allegorical Stained glass windows (20th century)
- The Furniture in the Church of Saint-Martin
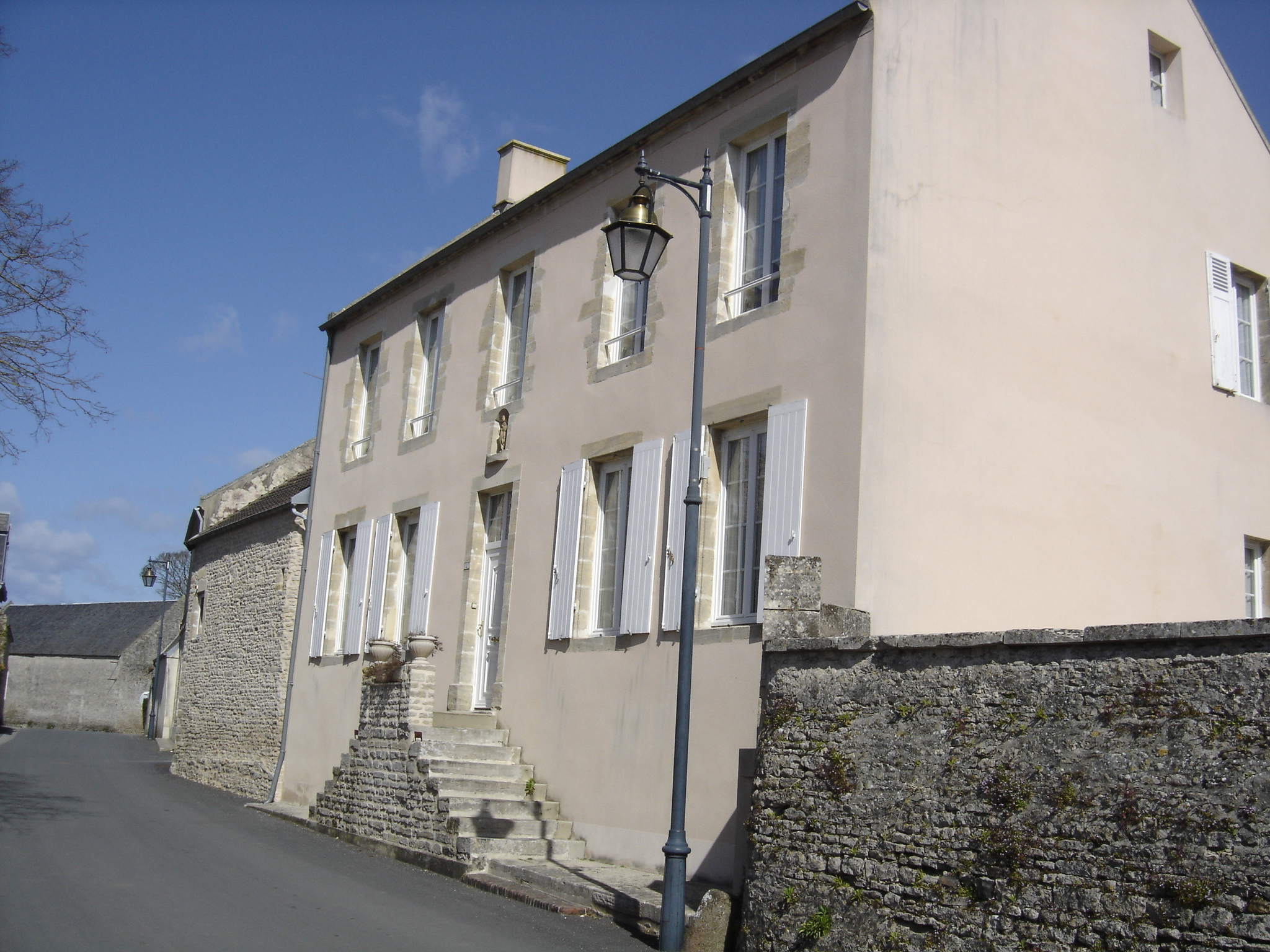
The Presbytery

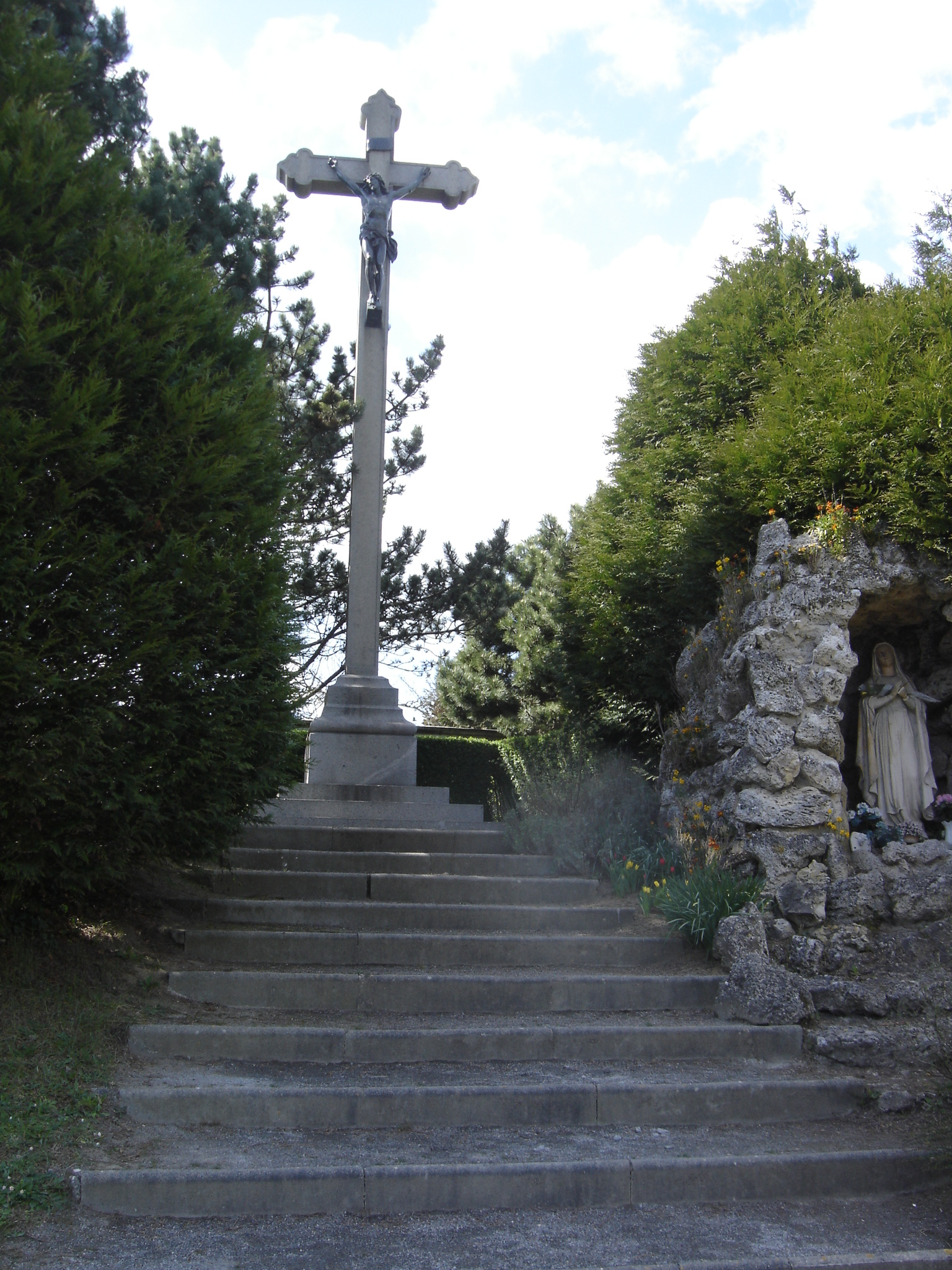
The Monumental cross

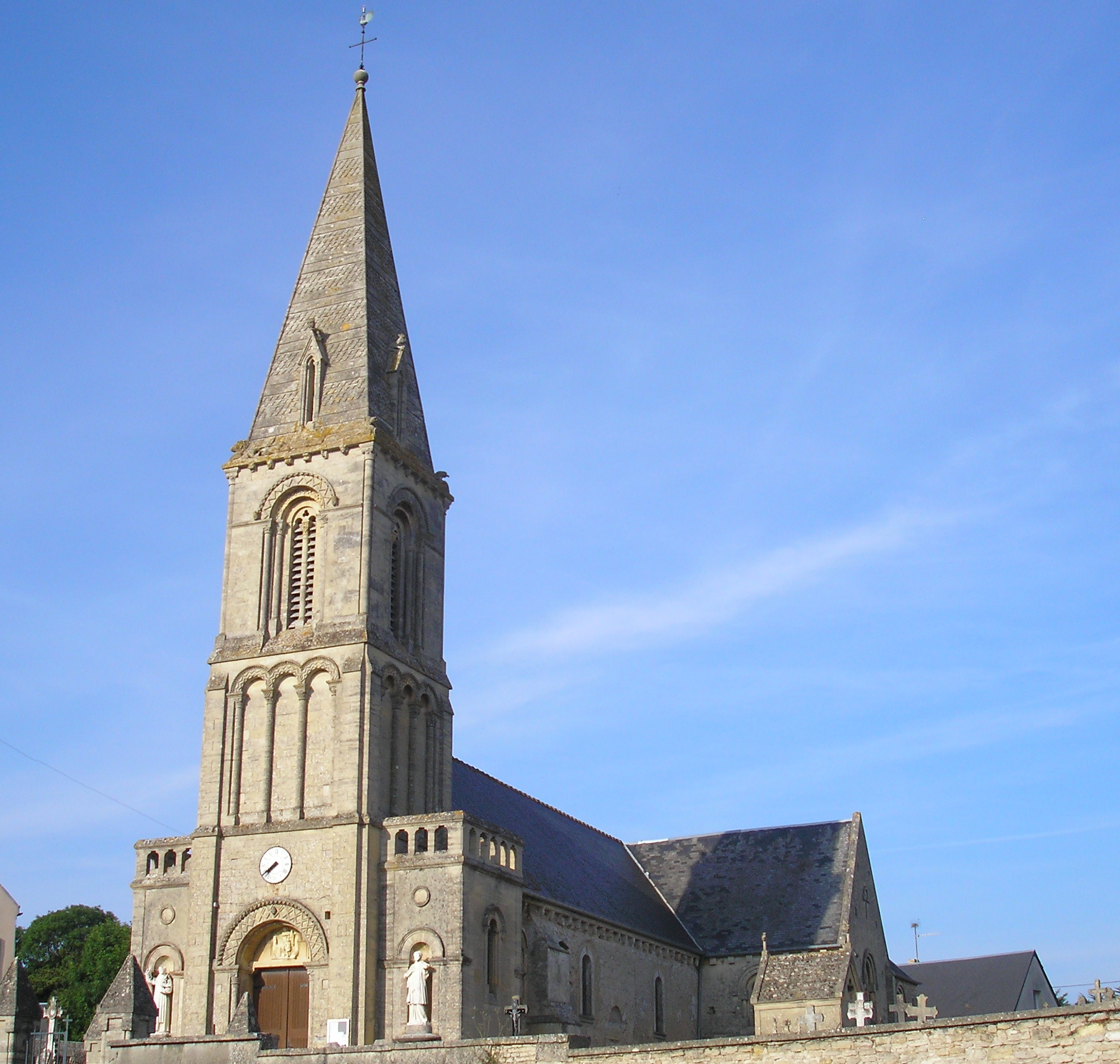
The Church of Saint-Martin

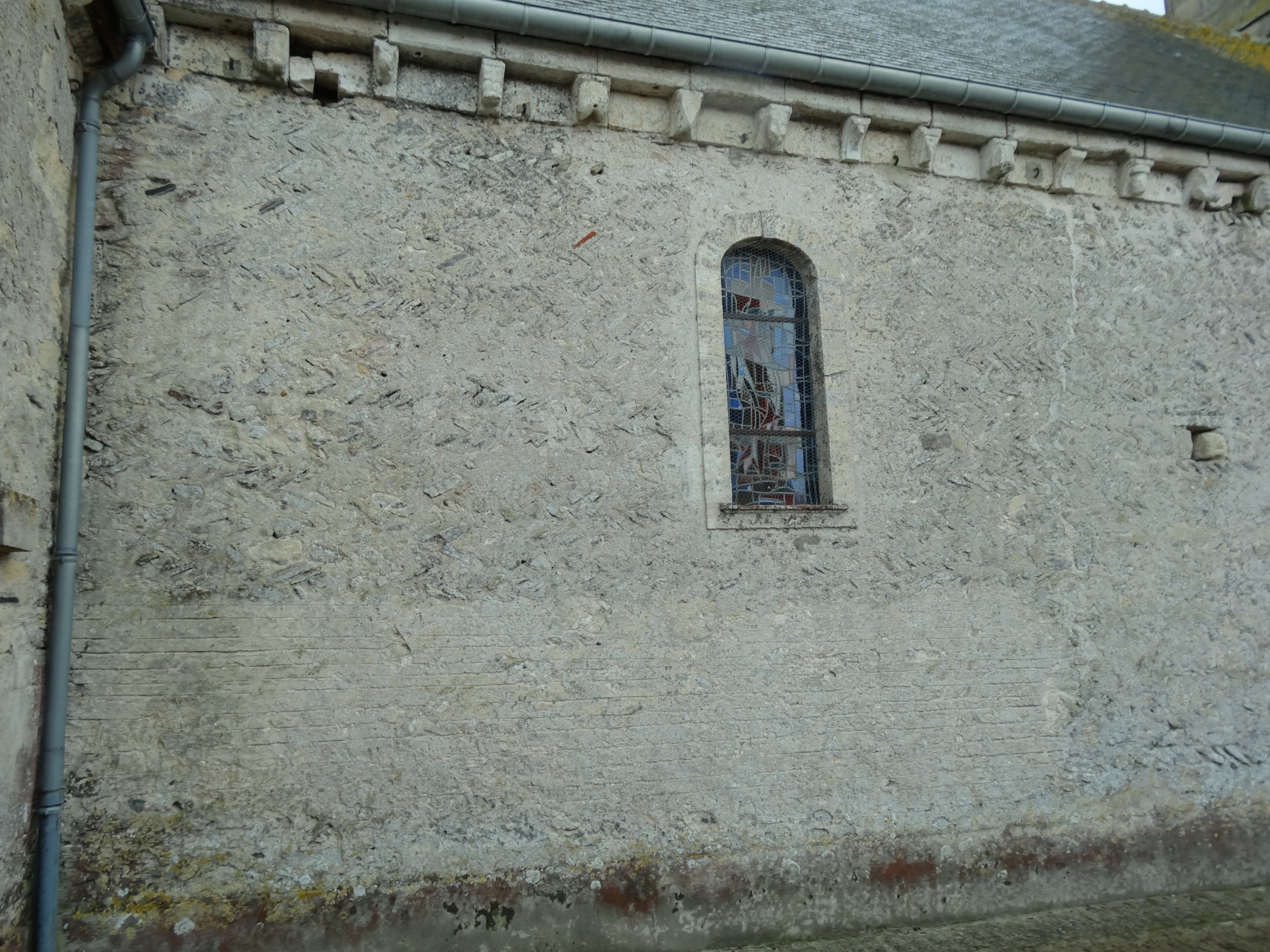
North side of the Church

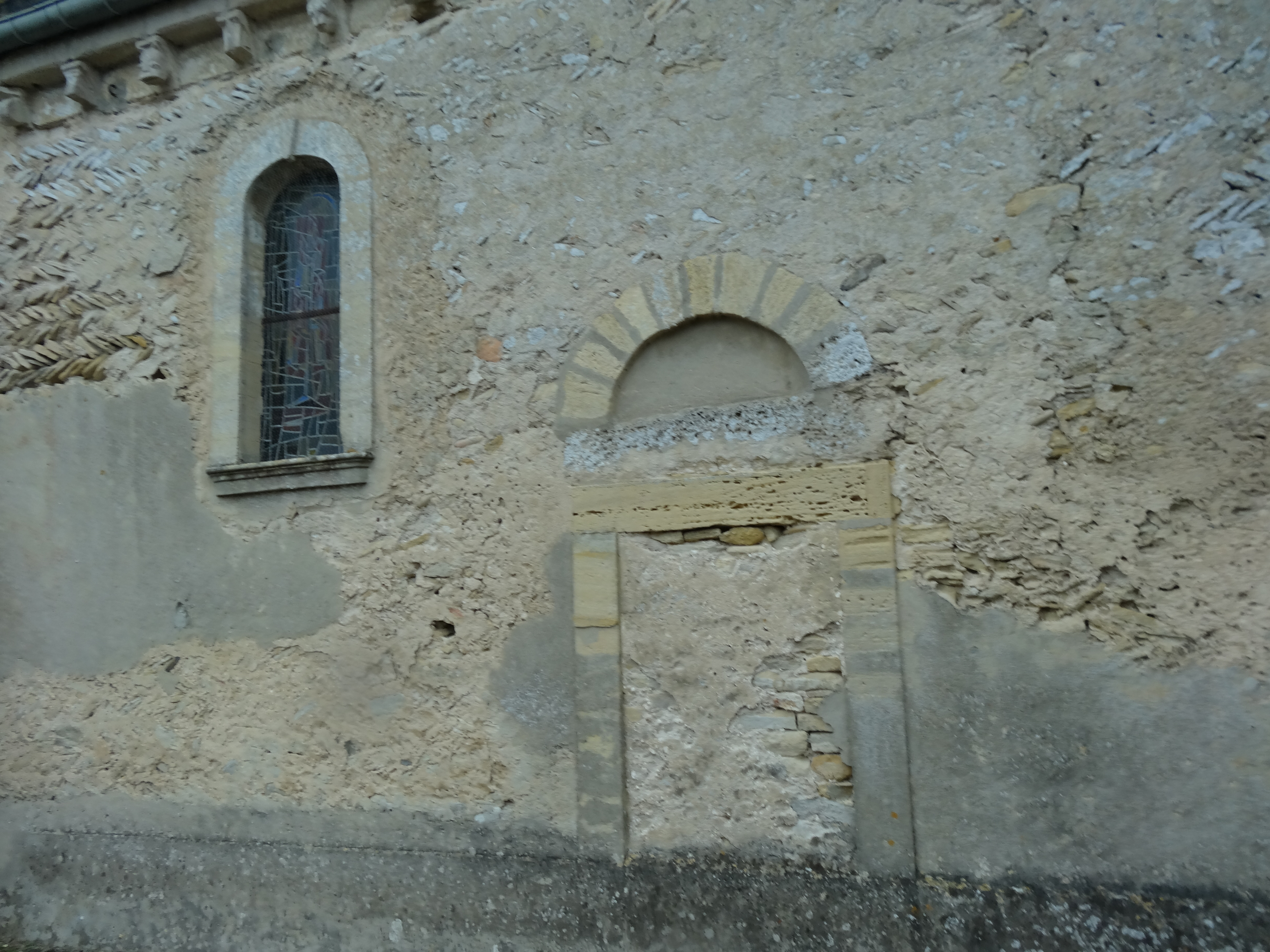
South side of the Church

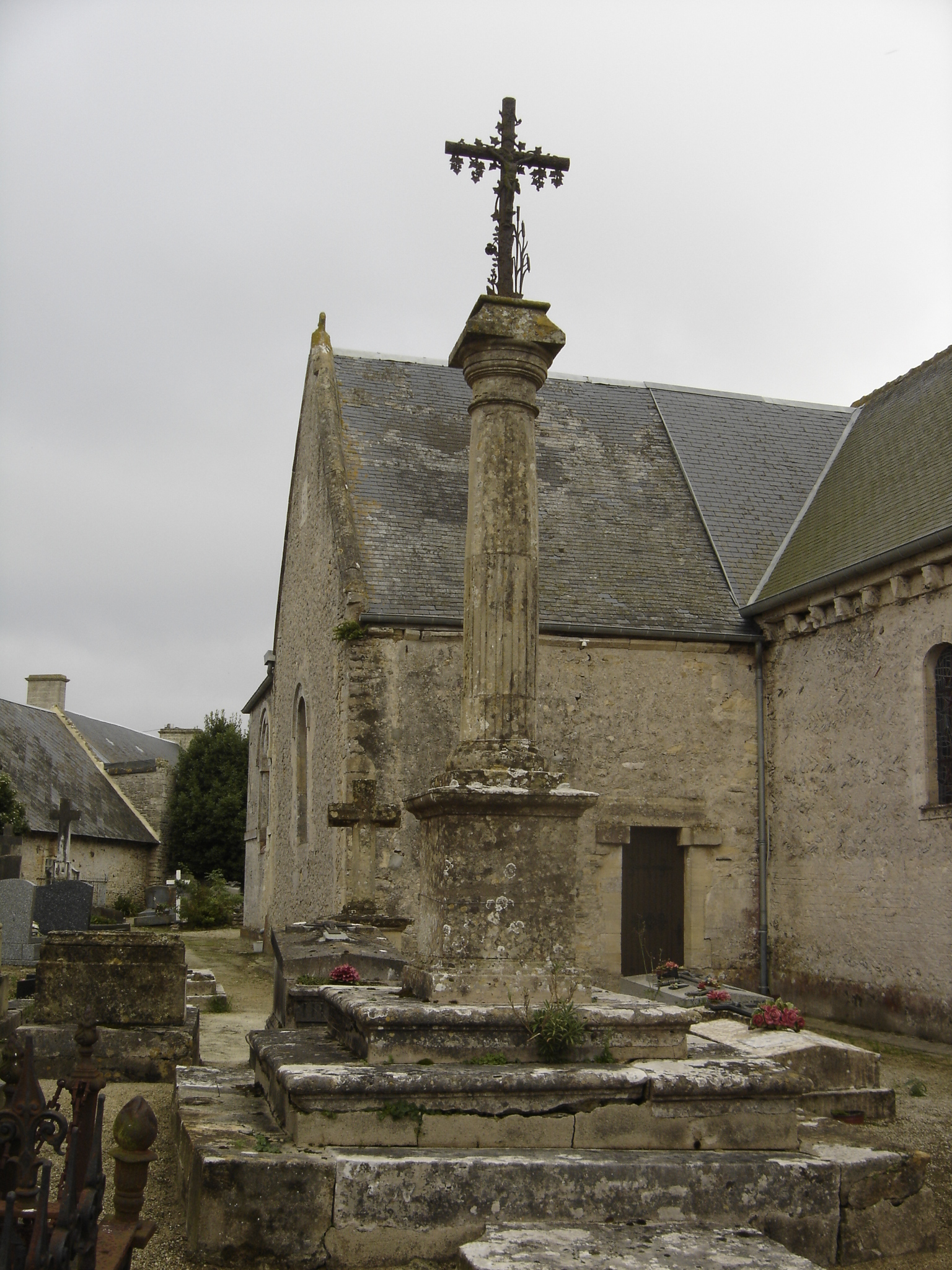
A Cross in the church cemetery

== Events ==
The Festival of the Sea takes place on 15 August every two years in odd years.

== Notable people linked to the commune ==
- Maurice Schumann (1911–1998), Companion of the Liberation, politician and journalist, is buried in the new municipal cemetery of Asnelles.
- Théodore Labbey (1804–1873), Mayor of Asnelles under the French Second Empire and author of the first book on the history of the commune: Asnelles, paintings and memories, 1865.
- Chigouesnel, magistrate, author of the monumental New History of Bayeux, 1867.
- Jean Elivaire (1824 at Courseulles to 1862 at Courseulles), architect of some resort villas in the Côte de Nacre, a hotel on the street on the waterfront

== Bibliography ==
- Labbey (Théodore), Asnelles, paintings and memories, Typographie Saint-Ange Duvant, Bayeux, 1865. (in French)
- Chanterenne (H. de), Analysis of old parish registers - Asnelles-sur-mer, Meuvaines, Henri Delesques, Caen, 1912. (in French)
- Pouchain (Gérard), Asnelles and its history, photography by Pierre Touraine, Imprimerie La Renaissance du Bessin, Bayeux, 1973. (in French)
- Pouchain (Gérard), Asnelles-la-Belle-Plage in postcards, Imprimerie Lebrun, Caen, 1979. (in French)
- Pouchain (Gérard), Asnelles-sur-Mer, preface by Alain Garnavault and Gilbert Rameaux, photography by Pierre Touraine, La Renaissance du Bessin, Bayeux, 1990. (in French)
- Ducouret (Bernard), Villas of Arromanches-les-Bains, Asnelles, Tracy-sur-Mer, Ver-sur-Mer, Itineraries of heritage, 1993. (in French)
- Pouchain (Gérard), Asnelles-la-Belle-Plage and its surroundings, preface by Frédéric Gavard, Éditions Charles Corlet, Condé-sur-Noireau, 1997. (in French)
- Le Bessin, Churches of the heart, "Saint-Martin d'Asnelles", A.D.T.L.B., 1997. (in French)
- Pouchain (Gérard), The Church of Saint-Martin of Asnelles, preface by Monseigneur Pierre Pican, Bishop of Bayeux and Lisieux, Éditions Charles Corlet, Condé-sur-Noireau, 1999. (in French)
- Pouchain (Gérard), Sea bathing and thermalism in Normandy, Birth of sea bathing at Asnelles, Acts of the 36th congress of Historical and Archaeological societies of Normandy, Annales de Normandie, Caen, 2002. (in French)
- Saunders (Tim), Gold beach - Jig, Jig sector and west - June 1944, Leo Cooper, 2002.
- Pouchain (Gérard), 100 Postcards of Asnelles during the Belle Époque, Éditions Charles Corlet, Condé-sur-Noireau, 2003. (in French)
- Hargrove (Charles), Asnelles, 6 June 1944, preface by Admiral Brac de La Perrière, Collection Histoires normandes, Esther Flon Éditions, Lisieux, 2004. (in French)
- Benamou (Jean-Pierre), Gold beach, Collection Memory 1944, OREP Éditions, 2004.
- Trew (Simon), Gold beach, Sutton publishing, 2004.
- Cormier (Antoine) and Vermont (Bertrand), It was then a town by the sea, Les Sablés d'Asnelles, Les Tourelles, 2004. (in French)
- Meigh (Harry J), My memories of the campaign in Normandy, June 1944, (s.n.), (s.d.).
- Pouchain (Gérard), Asnelles in the Press (1808–1873), 2005; Asnelles in the Press (1874–1892), 2006; Asnelles in the Press (1893–1901), 2007, La Renaissance du Bessin, Bayeux, Asnelles in the Press (1902–1921), 2008; Asnelles in the Press (1922–1937), 2009; Asnelles in the Press (1938–1957), Diamen, Bayeux. (in French)
- Pouchain (Gérard), Asnelles the beautiful beach (1894–1896), photography by Philibert Bonvillain, Diamen, Bayeux, 2008. (in French)
- Pouchain (Gérard), The Marcia C. Day, [Les Tamaris, Les Tourelles, Les Sablés d'Asnelles], Diamen, Bayeux, 2008. (in French)
- Pouchain (Gérard), 6 June 1944, Asnelles - Le Hamel, (Les Tamaris, Les Tourelles, Les Sablés d'Asnelles), Diamen, Bayeux, 2010. (in French)
- Pouchain (Gérard), Maurice Schumann - Asnelles and Bayeux, places of Liberty and Fidelity (6 June 1944 – 13 February 1998), 2011, Diamen, Bayeux. (in French)
- Le Trait d'union (Parish journal), 1932-1937 and 1948-1958. (in French)
- La Belle Plage (School journal), 1949-1964. (in French)
- Asnelles Informations (Municipal journal), 1983-1993. (in French)
- Asnelles Infos (Municipal journal), 1995-2000. (in French)
- Asnelles Nouvelles (Municipal journal), depuis 2001. (in French)
- La Renaissance Le Bessin - Côte de Nacre, Asnelles à la loupe, 2 August 2005. (in French)
- Ducouret (Bernard) and Perrein (Christian), Topographic Inventory of Asnelles, Base Mérimée (Ministry of Culture website), 1990. (in French)

== See also ==
- Communes of the Calvados department

=== External links ===
- Asnelles on the Community of communes website (in French)
- The Twinning site between Asnelles and Charmouth
- Tourist Office of Asnelles
- Asnelles on Géoportail, National Geographic Institute (IGN) website (in French)
- Asnelles on the 1750 Cassini Map
