= Samuel baronets =

Set index for Samuel baronets

There have been four baronetcies created for people with the surname Samuel, all in the Baronetage of the United Kingdom. As of 2026 two of the titles are extant.

- Samuel baronets of Nevern Square (1898)
- Samuel baronets of The Mote and Portland Place (1903): see Viscount Bearsted
- Samuel baronets of Chelwood Vachery (1912): see Sir Stuart Montagu Samuel, 1st Baronet (1856–1926)
- Samuel baronets of Mancroft (1932): see Baron Mancroft

== See also ==
- Viscount Samuel
- Baron Swaythling
