= Stanier baronets =

Baronetcy in the Baronetage of the United Kingdom

Arms of Stanier: or on a pile azure ten escallops, four, three, two and one of the field

The Stanier Baronetcy, of Peplow Hall in Hodnet in the County of Shropshire, is a title in the Baronetage of the United Kingdom. It was created on 16 July 1917 for Beville Stanier, Conservative Member of Parliament for Newport and Ludlow and local newspaper proprietor. His son, the second Baronet, was a Brigadier in the Welsh Guards and a member of the Shropshire County Council.

As of 2007 the title is held by the latter's son, the third Baronet, who succeeded in 1995. He inherited Shotover Park in Oxfordshire from his late uncle Sir John Miller, Crown Equerry, and he was friends with Queen Elizabeth II. He got engaged in 2009, at the age of 75, to Nerena Stephenson, née Villiers, granddaughter of the 6th Earl of Clarendon. He is a Conservative district councillor for Great Horwood on Aylesbury Vale District Council.

== Stanier baronets, of Peplow Hall (1917) ==
- Sir Beville Stanier, 1st Baronet (1867–1921)
- Brigadier Sir Alexander Beville Gibbons Stanier, 2nd Baronet (1899–1995)
- Sir Beville Douglas Stanier, 3rd Baronet (born 1934)

The heir apparent to the baronetcy is the 3rd Baronet's only son, Alexander James Sinnott Stanier (born 1970)
