= Stevenson baronets =

Extinct baronetcy in the Baronetage of the United Kingdom

There have been two baronetcies created for persons with the surname Stevenson, both in the Baronetage of the United Kingdom. Both creations are extinct.

The Stevenson Baronetcy, of Cleveden, Kelvinside, in the County of the City of Glasgow, was created in the Baronetage of the United Kingdom on 22 July 1914 for the Scottish businessman, politician and philanthropist Daniel Macaulay Stephenson. The title became extinct on his death in 1944. The artist Robert Macaulay Stevenson was the younger brother of the first Baronet.

The Stevenson Baronetcy, of Walton Heath in the Parish of Walton-on-the-Hill in the County of Surrey, was created in the Baronetage of the United Kingdom on 21 February 1917. For more information on this creation, see James Stevenson, 1st Baron Stevenson.

== Stevenson baronets, of Cleveden (1914) ==
- Sir Daniel Macaulay Stevenson, 1st Baronet (1851–1944)

== Stevenson baronets, of Walton Heath (1917) ==
- see James Stevenson, 1st Baron Stevenson
