= Robert Bickersteth (bishop) =

The Right Reverend Robert Bickersteth FRS
- Bishop of Ripon
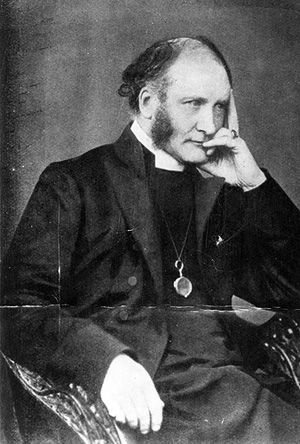
- Installed: 1857
- Term ended: 1884
- Predecessor: Charles Thomas Longley
- Successor: William Boyd Carpenter

Orders
- Ordination: 1845

Personal details
- Born: 24 August 1816 London, England
- Died: 15 April 1884 (aged 67)
- Buried: Ripon Cathedral
- Denomination: Anglican
- Spouse: Elizabeth Garde (m.1846)
- Children: Robert
- Education: Queens' College, Cambridge

The Rt Rev Robert Bickersteth FRS (24 August 1816 – 15 April 1884) was the Anglican Bishop of Ripon in the mid 19th century.

== Life ==
Robert Bickersteth was born into an ecclesiastical family, the son of Rev. John Bickersteth, sometime Rector of Sapcote. His brother Edward was a Dean of Lichfield. His uncle was Edward was also a priest and Edward Bickersteth, Bishop of Exeter was his cousin. Another uncle, a prominent barrister, was raised to the peerage as Baron Langdale. He was educated at Queens' College, Cambridge. Ordained in 1845, his first post was as a curate to his father. After a further curacy in Reading he became Rector of St John's, Clapham and then of St Giles in the Fields. Between 1854 and 1857 he was a canon at Salisbury Cathedral when he was elevated to the episcopate as the Bishop of Ripon, a post he held until his death.

He was elected a Fellow of the Royal Society in 1858.

His son, also named Robert Bickersteth, was a Liberal MP.

He consecrated the church of St Thomas the Apostle, Killinghall on 29 July 1880.

== Works ==
- The Social Effects of the Reformation (1859)
- Romanism in its relation to the second coming of Christ (1854)
- The Gifts of the Kingdom. Being Lectures Delivered During Lent (1855)

== Arms ==
Coat of arms of Robert Bickersteth
Escutcheon Argent, a cross flory sable charged with five mullets or, on a chief azure three roses or.

== Notes ==
Church of England titles
Preceded by Charles Thomas Longley	Bishop of Ripon; 1857 – 1884	Succeeded by William Boyd Carpenter
