= Daniel Macaulay Stevenson =

Sir Daniel Macaulay Stevenson, Bt

Chancellor of the University of Glasgow
- In office 1934–1944

Personal details
- Born: 1 August 1851 Glasgow, Scotland
- Died: 11 July 1944 (aged 92)
- Profession: Politician and businessman

Sir Daniel Macaulay Stevenson, 1st Baronet (1 August 1851 – 11 July 1944), was a Scottish politician, businessman and philanthropist, and former Chancellor of the University of Glasgow. His brother was Robert Macaulay Stevenson, a painter associated with the Glasgow Boys.

== Biography ==
Born in Glasgow in 1851, Stevenson made his fortune in the shipbroking and coal exportation industries before being elected to the City Council as a Liberal in 1882. Whilst on the Council, he was responsible for the Sunday-opening of the City's museums and galleries in 1898, the establishment of free branch libraries in 1899 and the introduction of a municipal telephone service in 1900. He was elected Lord Provost of Glasgow from 1911 until 1914, at which point he was awarded an honorary LL.D. by the University of Glasgow, and was created a Baronet, of Cleveden, Kelvinside, in the County of the City of Glasgow. He unsuccessfully contested the Partick seat at the 1922 General Election. He received the Freedom of the City in 1929.

Stevenson devoted much of his time to charitable work, particularly improving international cohesion between young people following the Great War. He inaugurated the Stevenson Lectureship in Citizenship was in 1921, and the Stevenson Chair of Italian and the Stevenson Chair of Spanish (now the Stevenson Chair in Hispanic Studies) in 1924, and in 1942 presented two gifts of £60,000 (more than £1.7m today) to the Engineering Department, and to the university for exchange scholarships with European universities.

In 1936, Stevenson funded and established the Scottish Ambulance Unit led by Fernanda Jacobsen, which provided humanitarian assistance in Madrid during the Spanish Civil War.

In 1934, Stevenson was elected chancellor of the university, a post he held until his death. Following his death, the trustees of his estate donated significant sums to assist the construction of a physical recreation building at the university in 1960, now named the Stevenson Building, and for the establishment of the Stevenson Chair of French Language and Literature in 1966.

Academic offices
Preceded by Sir Donald MacAlister	Chancellor of the University of Glasgow; 1934 to 1944	Succeeded by The Lord Boyd-Orr
Baronetage of the United Kingdom
New creation	Baronet (of Clevedon); 1914–1944	Extinct
