= Robert Bickersteth (MP) =

English administrator and Liberal politician

Robert Bickersteth (24 June 1847 – 10 July 1916) was an English administrator and Liberal politician.

Bickersteth was the son of Robert Bickersteth, Bishop of Ripon, and his wife, Elizabeth Garde of Co. Cork. He was educated at Eton, and at Corpus Christi College, Oxford (B.A. 1869). He was an inspector of factories between 1873 and 1880. From 1880 to 1885, he was private secretary to Lord Kimberly who was Secretary of State for the Colonies from 1880 to 1882, and Secretary of State for India from 1882 to 1885. He was a major in the Middlesex Yeomanry Cavalry.

In the 1885 general election, Bickersteth was elected member of parliament for Newport, Shropshire. He contested Leicester in the 1886 general election as a Liberal Unionist, but lost. He was an unpaid Secretary at India Office from February 1886.

Bickersteth married Lady Lavinia Louisa Bertie daughter of Montagu Bertie, 6th Earl of Abingdon in 1883.

Parliament of the United Kingdom
Preceded by see North Shropshire constituency South Shropshire constituency	Member of Parliament for Newport; New constituency 1885 – 1886	Succeeded by William Kenyon-Slaney
