= James Stevenson, 1st Baron Stevenson =

British businessman and civil servant

Portrait by Solomon Joseph Solomon, 1923

James Stevenson, 1st Baron Stevenson, GCMG (2 April 1873 – 10 June 1926), known as Sir James Stevenson, Bt, between 1917 and 1924, was a British businessman and civil servant.

== Education ==
Stevenson was educated at the Kilmarnock Academy. It would appear that his education there was interrupted – perhaps because his parents had had to withdraw him due to an inability to pay school fees – for when he enrolled in 1887 he had a previous admission number.

== Career ==
Stevenson joined the Johnnie Walker whisky blending company in 1888, working his way up to become its joint Managing Director. He is credited with having come up with the company's advertising slogan 'Born in 1820 – still going strong'. During the First World War he was appointed to a senior position in the Ministry of Munitions and in return for his service was created a Baronet, of Walton Heath in the Parish of Walton-on-the-Hill in the County of Surrey, on 11 April 1917. After the war he continued in government service and from 1921 he worked as a personal adviser to Winston Churchill, then Secretary of State for the Colonies. Immediately after the First World War he was responsible for the Stevenson Plan, which was an effort by the UK government to stabilise low rubber prices after a world glut of rubber.

Stevenson was appointed a Knight Grand Cross of the Order of St Michael and St George (GCMG) in the 1922 New Year Honours.

Stevenson later chaired the Standing Committee responsible for the British Empire Exhibition (1924–25). London's Wembley Stadium had been built as a temporary home for the exhibition, but Scotsman Stevenson fought successfully to prevent its demolition and it continued as an English national stadium into the 21st Century. He was raised to the peerage as Baron Stevenson, of Holmbury in the County of Surrey, on 7 May 1924, during the first premiership of Ramsay MacDonald. He was the first person from Kilmarnock to be elevated to the peerage.

== Writings ==
According to his obituary, in 1912 he published a novel, The Kiss of Chance (published by Eveleigh Nash, London, pp. 301), under the pseudonym Roland Dunster. A second novel was An Incurable Disease which The Strand Magazine says was illustrated by Septimus Edwin Scott.

== Personal life ==
Lord Stevenson died on 10 June 1926, aged 53, when the baronetcy and barony became extinct.

== Political relatives ==
- John Keith McBroom Laird (1907–1985) Canadian Senator – 2nd cousin, once removed
- Sir Alexander Stewart Stevenson (1860–1936) Edinburgh Lord Provost – uncle
- Stewart Stevenson (1946– ) Member of the Scottish Parliament (2001–2021), Minister for Transport, Infrastructure and Climate Change (2007–2010), Minister for Environment and Climate Change (2011–2012) – 1st cousin, once removed

Peerage of the United Kingdom
New creation	Baron Stevenson; 1924–1926	Extinct
Baronetage of the United Kingdom
New creation	Baronet (of Walton Heath); 1917–1926	Extinct
