= Samuel baronets of Nevern Square (1898) =

Escutcheon of the Samuel baronets of Nevern Square

The Samuel baronetcy, of Nevern Square, St Mary Abbots parish, Kensington, in the County of London, was created in the Baronetage of the United Kingdom on 8 March 1898 for Saul Samuel, Agent-General for New South Wales in the United Kingdom.

== Samuel baronets, of Nevern Square (1898) ==
- Sir Saul Samuel, 1st Baronet (1820–1900)
- Sir Edward Levien Samuel, 2nd Baronet (1868–1937)
- Sir Edward Louis Samuel, 3rd Baronet (1896–1961)
- Sir John Oliver Cecil Samuel, 4th Baronet (1916–1962)
- Sir John Michael Glen Samuel, 5th Baronet (born 1944)

The heir apparent is the present holder's son Anthony John Fulton Samuel (born 1972).

== Notes ==
Baronetage of the United Kingdom
Preceded by Ellis-Nanney baronets	Samuel baronets of Nevern Square; 8 March 1898	Succeeded by Durning-Lawrence baronets
