= Newport (Shropshire) (constituency) =

Parliamentary constituency in the United Kingdom, 1885–1918

Newport
- Former county constituency for the House of Commons

1885–1918
- Seats: one
- Created from: North Shropshire

Newport is a former United Kingdom Parliamentary constituency for the town of Newport, Shropshire. It was a constituency of the House of Commons of the Parliament of the United Kingdom from 1885 to 1918. It elected one Member of Parliament.

== Members of Parliament ==
Election	Member	Party
1885	Robert Bickersteth	Liberal
1886	Robert Bickersteth	Liberal Unionist
1886	William Kenyon-Slaney	Conservative
1908 b-e	Beville Stanier	Conservative
1918	constituency abolished	

== Elections ==
=== Elections in the 1880s ===
General election 1885: Newport (Shropshire)
Party	Candidate	Votes	%	±%
Liberal	Robert Bickersteth	4,694	52.0	
Conservative	George Bridgeman, Viscount Newport	4,333	48.0	
Majority		361	4.0	
Turnout		9,027	84.9	
Registered electors		10,636		
Liberal win (new seat)				

General election 1886: Newport (Shropshire)
Party	Candidate	Votes	%	±%
Conservative	William Kenyon-Slaney	4,460	60.7	+12.7
Liberal	Clement Higgins	2,884	39.3	−12.7
Majority		1,576	21.4	N/A
Turnout		7,344	69.0	−15.9
Registered electors		10,636		
Conservative gain from Liberal		Swing	+12.7	

=== Elections in the 1890s ===
General election 1892: Newport (Shropshire)
Party	Candidate	Votes	%	±%
Conservative	William Kenyon-Slaney	4,815	57.7	−3.0
Liberal	William Heath Lander	3,530	42.3	+3.0
Majority		1,285	15.4	−6.0
Turnout		8,345	73.6	+4.6
Registered electors		11,337		
Conservative hold		Swing	−3.0	

General election 1895: Newport (Shropshire)
Party	Candidate	Votes	%	±%
Conservative	William Kenyon-Slaney	Unopposed		
Conservative hold				

=== Elections in the 1900s ===
General election 1900: Newport (Shropshire)
Party	Candidate	Votes	%	±%
Conservative	William Kenyon-Slaney	Unopposed		
Conservative hold				

Kenyon-Slaney

General election 1906: Newport (Shropshire)
Party	Candidate	Votes	%	±%
Conservative	William Kenyon-Slaney	4,853	50.9	N/A
Liberal	Francis Neilson	4,677	49.1	New
Majority		176	1.8	N/A
Turnout		9,530	88.4	N/A
Registered electors		10,777		
Conservative hold		Swing	N/A	

1908 Newport by-election
Party	Candidate	Votes	%	±%
Conservative	Beville Stanier	5,328	54.9	+4.0
Liberal	Francis Neilson	4,377	45.1	−4.0
Majority		951	9.8	+8.0
Turnout		9,705	89.9	+1.5
Registered electors		10,791		
Conservative hold		Swing	+4.0	

=== Elections in the 1910s ===
General election January 1910: Newport (Shropshire)
Party	Candidate	Votes	%	±%
Conservative	Beville Stanier	5,570	56.3	+5.4
Liberal	William Edward Moulsdale	4,324	43.7	−5.4
Majority		1,246	12.6	+10.8
Turnout		9,894	90.9	+2.5
Registered electors		10,886		
Conservative hold		Swing	+5.4	

General election December 1910: Newport (Shropshire)
Party	Candidate	Votes	%	±%
Conservative	Beville Stanier	Unopposed		
Conservative hold				

== See also ==
- Parliamentary constituencies in Shropshire#Historical constituencies
- List of former United Kingdom Parliament constituencies
- Unreformed House of Commons
