= Foxe =

Foxe is an Irish and English surname, a variant of Fox. Notable people with the surname include:

- Charles Foxe (1516–1590), English politician
- Cyrinda Foxe (1952–2002), American actress
- Earle Foxe (1891–1973), American actor
- Edmund Foxe (by 1515 – 1550), English politician
- Edward Foxe (c. 1496 – 1538), English churchman
- Fanne Foxe (1936–2021), Argentine-American stripper
- Hayden Foxe (born 1977), Australian footballer
- John Foxe (1517–1587), English historian and martyrologist
  - Foxe's Book of Martyrs, his major work
- John Foxe (MP) (died 1586), English politician
- John Foxe (neuroscientist) (born 1967), Irish neuroscientist
- Kevin Foxe (fl. from 1982), American director and producer
- Luke Foxe (1586–1635), Arctic explorer
- Richard Foxe (c. 1448–1528), English churchman
- Samuel Foxe (1560–1630), English diarist and politician
- Tom Foxe (1937–2000), Irish politician
- William Foxe (1479/80 – 1554), English politician

== Fictional characters ==
- Luke Fox (character), in DC Comics
