= Richard Langford =

Richard Langford may refer to:

- Richard Langford (MP for Wells) (fl. 1419), MP for Wells, Somerset
- Richard Langford (MP for Ludlow) (died 1580), MP for Ludlow, Shropshire
- Richard Langford (priest), Welsh Anglican priest
- Richard Langford, character in Two and a Half Deaths

== See also ==
- Rick Langford, American baseball pitcher
