= George Windsor-Clive =

George Windsor-Clive may refer to:

- George Windsor-Clive (politician, born 1835) (1835–1918), MP for Ludlow 1860–1885
- George Windsor-Clive (politician, born 1878) (1878–1968), MP for Ludlow 1923–1945, son of above

== See also ==
- George Windsor (disambiguation)
- George Clive (disambiguation)
