= William Vane, 3rd Duke of Cleveland =

British politician (1792–1864)

His Grace The Duke of Cleveland

Member of Parliament for Ludlow
- In office 1852–1857 Serving with Robert Windsor Clive, Percy Egerton Herbert
- Preceded by: Henry Salwey; Henry Bayley Clive
- Succeeded by: Beriah Botfield; Percy Egerton Herbert

Member of Parliament for St Ives
- In office 1846–1852
- Preceded by: William Tyringham Praed
- Succeeded by: Robert Laffan

Member of Parliament for County Durham
- In office 1815–1831 Serving with John Lambton, William Russell
- Preceded by: Viscount Barnard; John Lambton
- Succeeded by: Sir Hedworth Williamson, Bt; William Russell

Member of Parliament for Winchelsea
- In office 1812–1815 Serving with Calverley Bewicke
- Preceded by: Sir Oswald Mosley, Bt; Calverley Bewicke
- Succeeded by: Henry Brougham; Calverley Bewicke

Personal details
- Born: William John Frederick Vane; 3 April 1792
- Died: 6 September 1864 (aged 72)
- Spouse: Lady Grace Caroline Lowther (m. 1815)
- Relations: Harry Powlett, 6th Duke of Bolton (grandfather); Henry Vane, 2nd Duke of Cleveland (brother); Harry Powlett, 4th Duke of Cleveland (brother)
- Parent(s): William Vane, 1st Duke of Cleveland; Lady Katherine Powlett
- Education: Brasenose College, Oxford

William John Frederick Vane, 3rd Duke of Cleveland (3 April 1792 – 6 September 1864), styled The Hon. William Vane from 1792 to 1813, The Hon. William Powlett from 1813 to 1827 and Lord William Powlett from 1827 to 1864, was a British politician.

== Early life ==
Vane was the second son of William Vane, 1st Duke of Cleveland and his first wife, Katherine, the second daughter and coheiress of Harry Powlett, 6th Duke of Bolton.

Vane was educated at Brasenose College, Oxford.

== Career ==
He was Member of Parliament for Winchelsea from 1812 to 1815, for County Durham from 1815 to 1831, for St Ives from 1846 to 1852, and for Ludlow from 1852 to 1857. On 3 July 1815 at St James's Church, Piccadilly, he married Lady Grace Caroline Lowther (1792–1883), the fifth daughter of William Lowther, 1st Earl of Lonsdale.

After inheriting the estate of his maternal grandmother, the Dowager Duchess of Bolton in 1809, he changed his surname to Powlett, under the terms of her will, by Royal Licence in 1813. On inheriting the dukedom of Cleveland from his childless brother Henry in 1864, he resumed the surname of Vane.

== Personal life ==
On 3 July 1815, Vane married Lady Grace Caroline Lowther (d. 1883), a daughter of William Lowther, 1st Earl of Lonsdale. Late in life, he lived at Harewood House, at Cheapside, in Berkshire.

Like his elder brother Henry, William also died childless and his titles passed to their younger brother, Harry, who took the name of Powlett shortly after.

Parliament of the United Kingdom
Preceded by Sir Oswald Mosley, Bt; Calverley Bewicke	Member of Parliament for Winchelsea; 1812–1815; With: Calverley Bewicke	Succeeded by Henry Brougham; Calverley Bewicke
Preceded by Viscount Barnard; John Lambton	Member of Parliament for County Durham; 1815–1831; With: John Lambton 1815–1828; William Russell 1828–1831	Succeeded by Sir Hedworth Williamson, Bt; William Russell
Preceded by William Tyringham Praed	Member of Parliament for St Ives; 1846–1852	Succeeded by Robert Laffan
Preceded by Henry Salwey; Henry Bayley Clive	Member of Parliament for Ludlow; 1852–1857; With: Robert Windsor Clive 1852–1854; Percy Egerton Herbert 1854–1857	Succeeded by Beriah Botfield; Percy Egerton Herbert
Peerage of the United Kingdom
Preceded by Henry Vane	Duke of Cleveland; 1864	Succeeded by Harry Vane
