= Newcastle, Shropshire =

Village in Shropshire, England

Coordinates: 52.434°N 3.107°W

Newcastle
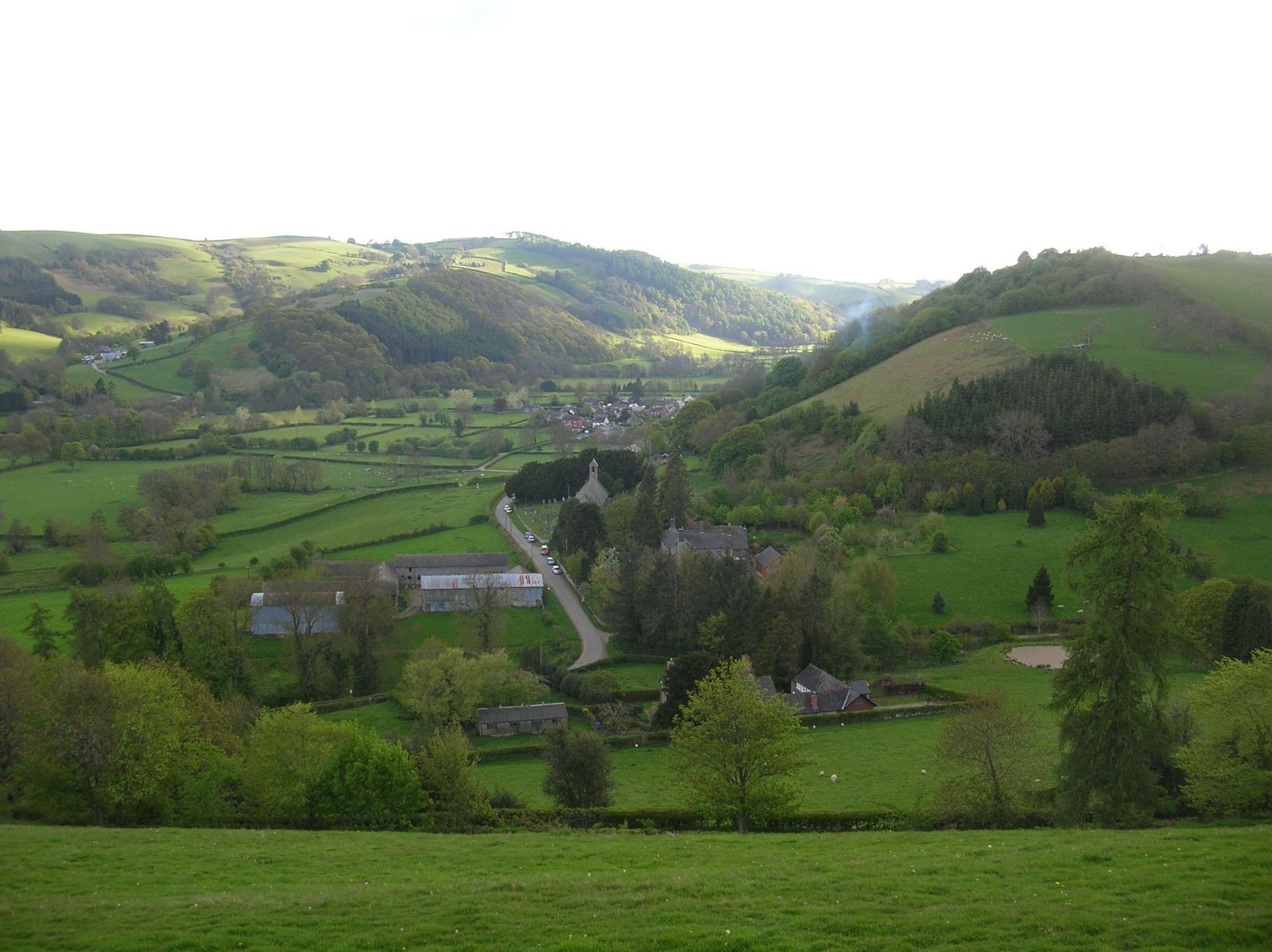
- A view over the village of Newcastle taken from the Offa's Dyke Path

- Location within Shropshire
- Population: 319 (2011)
- OS grid reference: SO247823
- Civil parish: Newcastle on Clun
- Unitary authority: Shropshire
- Ceremonial county: Shropshire
- Region: West Midlands
- Country: England
- Sovereign state: United Kingdom
- Post town: CRAVEN ARMS
- Postcode district: SY7
- Dialling code: 01588
- Police: West Mercia
- Fire: Shropshire
- Ambulance: West Midlands
- UK Parliament: Ludlow

Newcastle (also known as Newcastle-on-Clun) is a village in the rural south west of Shropshire, England. It lies at the confluence of the River Clun and the Folly Brook, 3 miles west of the small town of Clun. The B4368 runs through the village, on its way between Craven Arms in Shropshire to Newtown in Powys.

The village has a community hall, a campsite (Clun Valley Camping, now permanently closed), a church and a pub (the "Crown Inn").

== Parish ==
Newcastle on Clun is a civil parish which covers the village and surrounding countryside, reaching the border with Wales to the north. It is part of the remote and very rural Clun Forest, part of the Shropshire Hills AONB. Offa's Dyke and Offa's Dyke Path run through the area. The parish forms part of the Clun electoral division of Shropshire Council. In 2011 the parish had a population of 319.

== Church ==
The Church of England parish church, dedicated to St John the Evangelist, was built by Shrewsbury architect Edward Haycock, Sr. in 1848. As a memorial to the First World War, electric lighting was installed in the building. The churchyard contains war graves of a soldier of World War I and another of World War II.

== Newcastle A.F.C. ==
An association football club exists in the village, called Newcastle A.F.C. or Newcastle Football Club, whose home ground is the Mill Field, situated to the southwest of the village between the B-road and the Folly Brook. They were founded in 1975. Despite being based in England they play in the Montgomeryshire Amateur Football League (part of the Welsh football league system). Another Shropshire village, also in the southwest of Shropshire, also previously had a team playing in the same league: Bucknell.

== See also ==
- Listed buildings in Newcastle on Clun
