= Edward Calcott Pryce =

British Solicitor and politician

Captain Edward Calcott Pryce CBE (1885 – 20 October 1972), was a British Solicitor and Liberal Party politician.

== Background ==
Pryce was the son of David Pryce, of Guilsfield. He was educated at Welshpool and Aberystwyth. In 1911 he married Sylvia Middleton of Arbroath, Scotland. He was awarded the OBE in 1940 and the CBE in 1957.

== Professional career ==
Pryce qualified as a solicitor in 1909. He served in the European War of 1914–18, and the War of 1939–45. In 1954 he was appointed the Sheriff, of the City of London. In 1956 he was appointed the High Sheriff of Montgomeryshire.

== Political career ==
Pryce unsuccessfully contested the 1910 London County Council election as a Progressive Party candidate in Hackney North. He was National Liberal candidate for the Ludlow division of Shropshire at the 1922 General Election. After that election, when the 1923 Ludlow by-election occurred, following the mood around the country, the National Liberals and Liberals in Ludlow united behind his candidature and he ran as a united Liberal candidate. Although he finished a strong second, he did not run for election again.

=== Electoral record ===
1910 London County Council: Hackney North
Party	Candidate	Votes	%	±%
Municipal Reform	George Jones	5,133	28.4	
Municipal Reform	Oscar Emanuel Warburg	5,042	27.9	
Progressive	Edward Calcott Pryce	3,970	21.9	
Progressive	John Bussey	3,953	21.8	
Majority		1,072	5.9	
Municipal Reform hold		Swing		

1922 General Election: Ludlow
Party	Candidate	Votes	%	±%
Unionist	Ivor Miles Windsor-Clive	11,785	66.4	
National Liberal	Edward Calcott Pryce	5,979	33.7	
Majority		5,808	32.6	
Turnout			71.6	
Unionist hold		Swing		

1923 Ludlow by-election
Party	Candidate	Votes	%	±%
Unionist	George Windsor-Clive	9,956	55.0	−11.4
Liberal	Edward Calcott Pryce	6,740	37.2	+3.5
Labour	Percy Frederick Pollard	1,420	7.8	n/a
Majority			17.8	−14.8
Turnout			73.0	+1.4
Unionist hold		Swing	-7.5	
