= William Leveson-Gower =

William Leveson-Gower may refer to:

- Sir William Leveson-Gower, 4th Baronet (c. 1647–1691)
- William Leveson-Gower (died 1756) (c. 1696–1756), British Tory politician, MP for Staffordshire 1720–1756
- William Leveson-Gower, 4th Earl Granville (1880–1953)

== See also ==
- William Gower, MP
