= 1903 Ludlow by-election =

UK parliamentary by-election

Ludlow by-election, 1903
| ← 1900 | 22 December 1903 | 1906 → |
| Candidate | Rowland Hunt | Frederic Horne |
| Party | Liberal Unionist | Liberal |
| Popular vote | 4,393 | 3,423 |
| Percentage | 56.2% | 43.8% |
MP before election
Robert Jasper More
Liberal Unionist
Subsequent MP
Rowland Hunt
Liberal Unionist

The 1903 Ludlow by-election was a Parliamentary by-election held on 22 December 1903. The constituency returned one Member of Parliament (MP) to the House of Commons of the United Kingdom, elected by the first past the post voting system.

== Vacancy ==
Robert Jasper More had been Liberal Unionist MP for the seat of Ludlow since the 1892 General Election. He died on 25 November 1903 at the age of 67.

== Electoral history ==
The seat had been Liberal Unionist since they gained it in 1886. They held the seat at the last election, unopposed. The last occasion a Liberal had stood was in 1892 when the Unionists won easily;

More

General election 1892: Ludlow
| Party | Candidate | Votes | % | ±% |
|---|---|---|---|---|
| Liberal Unionist | Robert Jasper More | 5,965 | 73.5 | N/A |
| Liberal | F Sydney Morris | 2,146 | 26.5 | New |
| Majority | | 3,819 | 47.0 | N/A |
| Turnout | | 8.111 | 71.9 | N/A |
| Liberal Unionist hold | | Swing | N/A | |

== Candidates ==
- The local Conservative Association selected 45 year-old Rowland Hunt as their candidate to defend the seat. Hunt was the son of Rowland Hunt, of Boreatton Hall, Baschurch, Shropshire and his wife Florence Marianne, daughter of Richard B. Humfrey, of Kibworth Hall, Leicestershire, and Stoke Albany House, Northamptonshire. The Hunts were one of the principal families of north Shropshire. His uncle George Ward Hunt was Chancellor of the Exchequer under Disraeli. Hunt was educated at Eton and Magdalene College, Cambridge. He served with the Lovat Scouts during the Second Boer War, and later became a Major in the City of London Yeomanry. In 1889, Hunt married Georgina Veronica Davidson, daughter of Colonel Duncan Davidson of Tulloch Castle in Dingwall. They had two sons and one daughter.
- The local Liberal Association selected 40 year-old Frederic Horne as their candidate to gain the seat. He had not stood for parliament before. After leaving Adams Grammar School, in Newport, Shropshire he studied farming in Shropshire. He farmed at Shifnal

== Campaign ==
Polling Day was fixed for the 22 December, just 27 days after the previous MP died.

== Result ==
The Liberal Unionist Party held the seat.

Ludlow by-election, 1903
| Party | Candidate | Votes | % | ±% |
|---|---|---|---|---|
| Liberal Unionist | Rowland Hunt | 4,393 | 56.2 | N/A |
| Liberal | Frederic Horne | 3,423 | 43.8 | New |
| Majority | | 970 | 12.4 | N/A |
| Turnout | | 7,816 | 75.3 | N/A |
| Liberal Unionist hold | | Swing | N/A | |

== Aftermath ==
At the following General Election the result was;

General election 1906: Ludlow
| Party | Candidate | Votes | % | ±% |
|---|---|---|---|---|
| Liberal Unionist | Rowland Hunt | 4,978 | 54.1 | −2.1 |
| Liberal | Frederic Horne | 4,218 | 45.9 | +2.1 |
| Majority | | 760 | 8.2 | −4.2 |
| Turnout | | 9,196 | 85.4 | +10.1 |
| Liberal Unionist hold | | Swing | -2.1 | |
