= Thomas Wheeler (MP) =

16th-century English politician

Thomas Wheeler (by 1513 – 1574), of Werrington, Staffordshire was an English politician.

He was a Member (MP) of the Parliament of England for Ludlow in 1539, 1545, March 1553 and October 1553.

Parliament of England
Preceded by William Foxe; John Cother	Member of Parliament for Ludlow; 1539; With: Charles Foxe	Succeeded by Charles Foxe; Edmund Foxe
Parliament of England
Preceded by Charles Foxe; Edmund Foxe	Member of Parliament for Ludlow; 1545; With: John Bradshaw	Succeeded by Robert Blount; Charles Foxe
Parliament of England
Preceded by Robert Blount; Charles Foxe	Member of Parliament for Ludlow; March 1553; With: Charles Foxe	Succeeded by Thomas Wheeler; John Passey
Parliament of England
Preceded by Thomas Wheeler; Charles Foxe	Member of Parliament for Ludlow; October 1553; With: John Passey	Succeeded by John Prise; Thomas Blashefield
