= 1923 Ludlow by-election =

UK parliamentary by-election

The 1923 Ludlow by-election was a parliamentary by-election for the British House of Commons constituency of Ludlow, Shropshire, on 19 April 1923.

== Vacancy ==
The by-election was caused by the succession to the peerage of the sitting Unionist MP, Ivor Windsor-Clive on 6 March 1923. He had been MP here since winning the seat in the January 1922 by-election.

== Election history ==
Conservative or Unionist candidates had won the seat at every election from 1903 onwards. The result at the last General election was;

1922 general election
Party	Candidate	Votes	%	±%
Unionist	Ivor Windsor-Clive	11,785	66.4	N/A
National Liberal	Edward Calcott Pryce	5,979	33.7	New
Majority		5,808	32.7	N/A
Turnout		17,764	71.6	N/A
Unionist hold		Swing		

== Candidates ==
The Unionist candidate was Lt-Col. George Windsor-Clive, a retired Army Officer. His father had sat for Ludlow in the 19th century. The Liberal candidate was Capt. Edward Calcott Pryce, a solicitor. He had been the National Liberal candidate at the last General Election. Following the mood around the country, the National Liberals and Liberals in Ludlow united behind his candidature. The Labour party chose to intervene in the contest and fielded Percy F. Pollard.

== Result ==
Despite the intervention of a Labour candidate, the Liberals managed to reduce the Unionist majority. The Labour candidate lost his deposit.

Ludlow by-election, 1923
Party	Candidate	Votes	%	±%
Unionist	George Windsor-Clive	9,956	55.0	−11.4
Liberal	Edward Calcott Pryce	6,740	37.2	+3.5
Labour	Percy F. Pollard	1,420	7.8	New
Majority		3,216	17.8	−14.9
Turnout		18,116	73.0	+1.4
Unionist hold		Swing	-7.5	

== Aftermath ==
Windsor-Clive continued as MP until retiring in 1945. The Unionists/Conservatives continued to hold the seat until 2001. The Liberal Party failed to capitalize on their strong showing and local unity by failing to run a candidate either in 1923 or 1924. Neither did Pryce stand for parliament again. The result at the following General election;

1923 general election
Party	Candidate	Votes	%	±%
Unionist	George Windsor-Clive	Unopposed	N/A	N/A
Unionist hold				

== See also ==
- List of United Kingdom by-elections
- United Kingdom by-election records
