= Henry Bayley Clive =

British Conservative politician

Member of Parliament for Ludlow
- In office 31 July 1847 – 9 July 1852 Serving with Henry Salwey
- Preceded by: James Ackers; Beriah Botfield
- Succeeded by: Robert Windsor-Clive; William Powlett

Personal details
- Born: 1800
- Died: 26 February 1870 (aged 69–70)
- Party: Conservative
- Parent: William Clive

Henry Bayley Clive (1800 – 26 February 1870) was a British Conservative politician.

Educated at Eton and at St John’s College, Cambridge, he was the fifth son of William Clive of Styche, and a cousin of Edward Clive, 1st Earl of Powis.

Clive was elected Conservative Member of Parliament for Ludlow at the 1847 general election and held the seat until 1852 when he did not seek re-election.

Parliament of the United Kingdom
Preceded by Beriah Botfield; James Ackers	Member of Parliament for Ludlow; 1847–1852; With: Henry Salwey	Succeeded by Robert Windsor-Clive; William Powlett
