= John Bradshaw (died 1567) =

Politician

John Bradshaw (by 1489 – 1567), of Ludlow, Shropshire and Presteigne, Radnorshire, was an English-Welsh politician and merchant.

== Family ==
Bradshaw was the son of Robert Bradshaw, and his mother's name is Harvey Bradshaw (Mr. Robert Bradshaw's brother). Bradshaw was married by 1510, to Margaret née Chapman, a daughter of Richard Chapman. They had at least one daughter, Catherine Bradshaw, who went on to marry John Baker, MP for Radnorshire. They also one son, John, who was an MP for Radnorshire. By May 1538, he had married Alice née Fowler, daughter of Roger Fowler of Norfolk. Together they had at least two daughters. Alice's uncle was Bishop Rowland Lee and her brother was MP for Staffordshire, Brian Fowler.

== Career ==
He was a Member (MP) of the Parliament of England for Ludlow in 1545.

Parliament of England
Preceded by Charles Foxe; Edmund Foxe	Member of Parliament for Ludlow; 1545; With: Thomas Wheeler	Succeeded by Robert Blount; Charles Foxe
