= Edward Romilly =

English cricketer & politician (1804-1870)

Edward Romilly (19 April 1804, London – 12 October 1870, Porthkerry, Glamorgan) was an English amateur cricketer who played from 1825 to 1831, and a Member of Parliament from 1832 to 1835. He was a Cambridge Apostle.

== Life ==
Edward Romilly was the third son of Sir Samuel Romilly. He was educated at King Edward VI School in Bury St Edmunds and entered Christ's College, Cambridge in 1822. In 1826, he migrated to Trinity Hall, and graduated LL.B. in 1828.

As a cricketer Romilly was mainly associated with Cambridge University Cricket Club and Marylebone Cricket Club (MCC), of which he was a member. He made 9 known appearances in important matches including one for the Gentlemen in 1827.

Standing as a Whig, he was elected at the 1832 general election as one of the two Members of Parliament (MP) for Ludlow, but was defeated at the 1835 general election.

Romilly was a member of the Board of Audit from 1837 to 1866, and its chairman from 1855 to 1865.

== Bibliography ==
- Arthur Haygarth, Scores & Biographies, Volume 1-2 (1744–1840), Lillywhite, 1862

Parliament of the United Kingdom
Preceded by Robert Clive; Viscount Clive	Member of Parliament for Ludlow; 1832 – 1835; With: Viscount Clive	Succeeded by Edmund Lechmere Charlton; Viscount Clive
