= Robert Windsor-Clive (MP) =

British politician

The Hon. Robert Windsor-Clive (24 May 1824 – 4 August 1859) was a British Conservative Party politician.

== Background ==
Windsor-Clive was the eldest son of Robert Clive, grandson of Edward Clive, 1st Earl of Powis, and great-grandson of Robert Clive, 1st Baron Clive ("Clive of India"). His mother was Lady Harriett Windsor, daughter of Other Windsor, 5th Earl of Plymouth. He was educated at Eton and St John's College, Cambridge. In 1855 the barony of Windsor was called out of abeyance in favour of his mother, who became the thirteenth Baroness Windsor in her own right. His younger brother George Windsor-Clive was also a politician.

== Career ==
Windsor-Clive entered Parliament for Ludlow at the 1852 general election, a seat he held until his resignation in January 1854 to contest a vacancy in Shropshire South. He was elected unopposed, and held the seat until his early death five years later.

He was commissioned Captain in the Worcestershire Yeomary in 1848, then succeeded his father in command as Lieutenant-Colonel in 1854, serving until his death.

== Family ==
Windsor-Clive married Lady Mary Selina Louisa Bridgeman, daughter of George Bridgeman, 2nd Earl of Bradford, in 1852. They had one son and three daughters. He died at 53 Lower Grosvenor Street, London, in August 1859, aged 35, and was buried at Bromfield Parish Church, near Ludlow. Lady Mary remained a widow until her death in July 1889. Their son Robert succeeded his grandmother as Baron Windsor in 1869. In 1905 the earldom of Plymouth was revived in his favour.

Parliament of the United Kingdom
Preceded by Henry Bayley Clive; Henry Salwey	Member of Parliament for Ludlow; 1852–1854; With: Lord William Powlett	Succeeded by Lord William Powlett; Percy Egerton Herbert
Preceded by Robert Clive; Viscount Newport	Member of Parliament for Shropshire South; 1854–1859; With: Viscount Newport	Succeeded by Viscount Newport; Sir Baldwin Leighton, Bt
