= Edward Herbert, 2nd Earl of Powis =

British peer and Tory politician

The Right Honourable The Earl of Powis KG
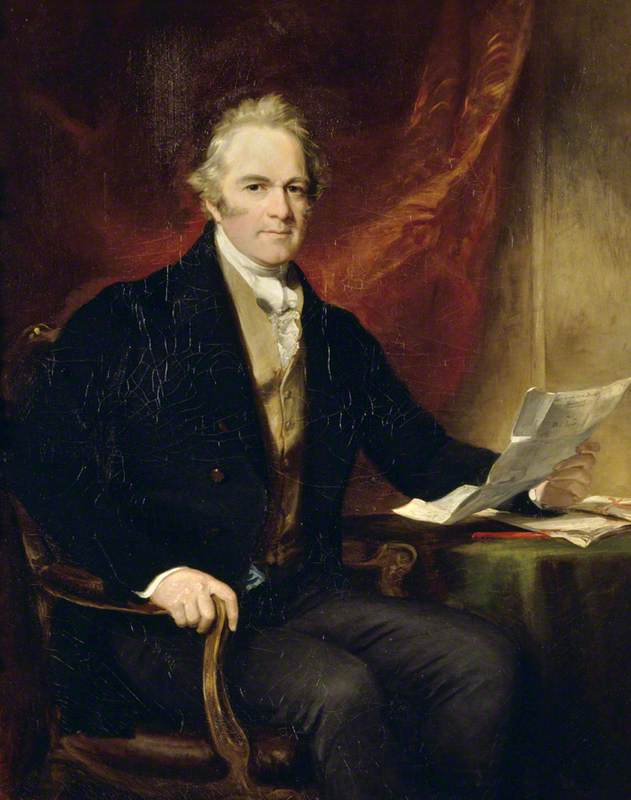
- Powis in 1845, portrait by Francis Grant

Lord Lieutenant of Montgomeryshire
- In office 1830–1848
- Monarchs: William IV; Victoria
- Preceded by: The Earl of Powis
- Succeeded by: The Lord Sudeley

Member of Parliament for Ludlow
- In office 1806–1839 Serving with: Robert Clive; Henry Clive; Robert Clive; Edward Romilly; Edmund Lechmere Charlton; Henry Salwey
- Preceded by: Richard Payne Knight; Robert Clive
- Succeeded by: Henry Salwey; Thomas Alcock

Personal details
- Born: 22 March 1785
- Died: 17 January 1848 (aged 62)
- Party: Tory
- Spouse: Lady Lucy Graham
- Children: Edward; Percy; George
- Parents: Edward Clive, 1st Earl of Powis; Lady Henrietta Herbert
- Education: University of Cambridge

Edward Herbert, 2nd Earl of Powis, KG (22 March 1785 – 17 January 1848), styled Viscount Clive between 1804 and 1839, was a British peer and Tory politician. He was the grandson of Clive of India.

== Early life ==
Edward was born on 22 March 1785, the son of Edward Clive, 1st Earl of Powis, and his wife, the former Lady Henrietta Herbert, daughter of Henry Herbert, 1st Earl of Powis. He was one of four children. His younger brother, Robert Henry Clive, was a noted politician. His elder sister, Henrietta, was the wife of Sir Watkin Williams-Wynn, 5th Baronet. His younger sister, Charlotte, was the wife of Hugh Percy, 3rd Duke of Northumberland, and she was famously the governess of the future Queen Victoria.

Edward was educated at Eton and St John's College, Cambridge, graduating as M.A. in 1806 and being awarded LL.D. by the same university in 1835. He also became an honorary D.C.L. from Oxford University in 1844, the year he also became a Knight of the Garter

=== Peerage and estates ===
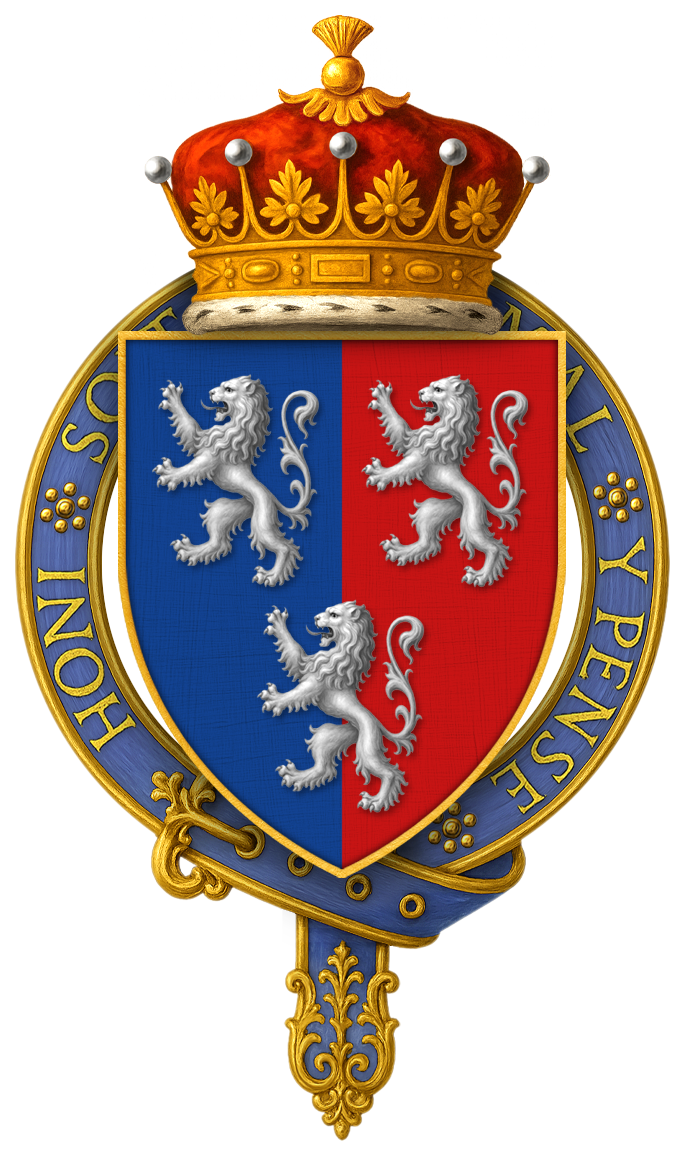
Garter-encircled arms of Edward Herbert, 2nd Earl of Powis, KG

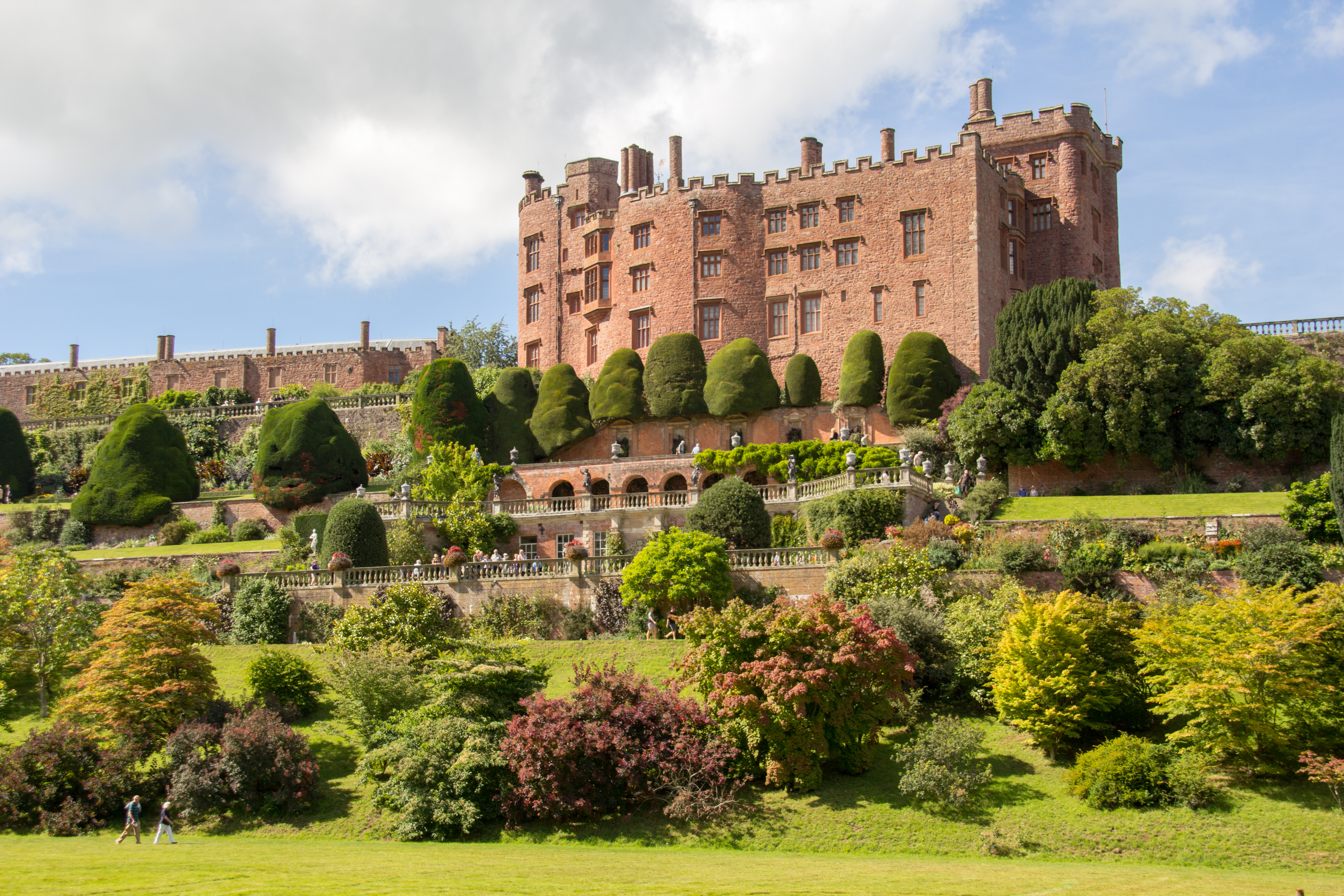
Powis Castle, Wales

After 1804, when his father was created Earl of Powis, he was known by the courtesy title of Viscount Clive, his father's second title. In 1806, he became a Member of Parliament for Ludlow, retaining the seat until he inherited the earldom and entered the House of Lords. He was also heir to his uncle George Herbert, 2nd Earl of Powis, who had died unmarried in 1801, and inherited the Powis Castle estates on condition that he assume the name and arms of Herbert only in lieu of those of Clive, which he did by Royal licence on 9 March 1807; other conditions were that he should settle his uncle's large gambling debts and that his father should leave the Clive estates to his younger son, Robert Henry Clive.

== Career ==
From 1806 to 1839, as Viscount Clive, he served in five successive parliaments as M.P. for Ludlow until succeeding to his father's Earldom, when he went up to the House of Lords.

On 29 November 1808 he was appointed Lieutenant-Colonel Commandant of the Eastern Montgomeryshire Local Militia, which existed until 1816. Powis also had long service in what became the Shropshire Yeomanry. In 1807 he was appointed major in command of a troop raised from Ludlow and Bishop's Castle towns, which merged into a larger South Shropshire Yeomanry Cavalry regiment in 1814. He continued under command within the new regiment, to which he succeeded as lieutenant-colonel in 1827. Succeeding his father as Lord-Lieutenant of Montgomeryshire in 1830, Powis played a leading role in the suppression of the Chartist riots of 1839, himself deploying four troops of his own regiment to disperse rioters from Newtown and apprehend some ringleaders while the Montgomeryshire Yeomanry were deployed in other parts of the same county. In addition to his yeomanry regiment, he was Colonel commanding the Royal Montgomeryshire Militia from 1846 to his death.

In 1812, as Viscount Clive, he served as treasurer of the Salop Infirmary in Shrewsbury.

The Earl was a bibliophile who built up by 1816 a book collection in Powis Castle sourced from travels in France, purchased partly from booksellers and partly from an auction of Empress Joséphine's library at Malmaison. He was elected to the Roxburghe Club in 1828 and became President in 1835, the year he sponsored their publication of The Lyvys of Seyntys (i.e. The Lives of Saints).

A defender of Church of England interests in Wales, in the Lords he led a successful opposition over 1843 to 1847 to a proposal to unite the sees of Bangor and St Asaph. He was ultimately appointed to a Royal Commission on English and Welsh bishoprics. A sum of £5,000 raised in testimonial to him was devoted to found the Powis Exhibitions to assist Welsh students at Oxford and Cambridge Universities intending to take holy orders.

In 1847, he stood for election as Chancellor of the University of Cambridge, but was defeated by only 117 votes by Albert, Prince Consort.

An encourager of canal building in Shropshire and into Montgomeryshire, he was at the time of his death Chairman of the Shropshire Union Railways and Canal Company.

== Personal life ==
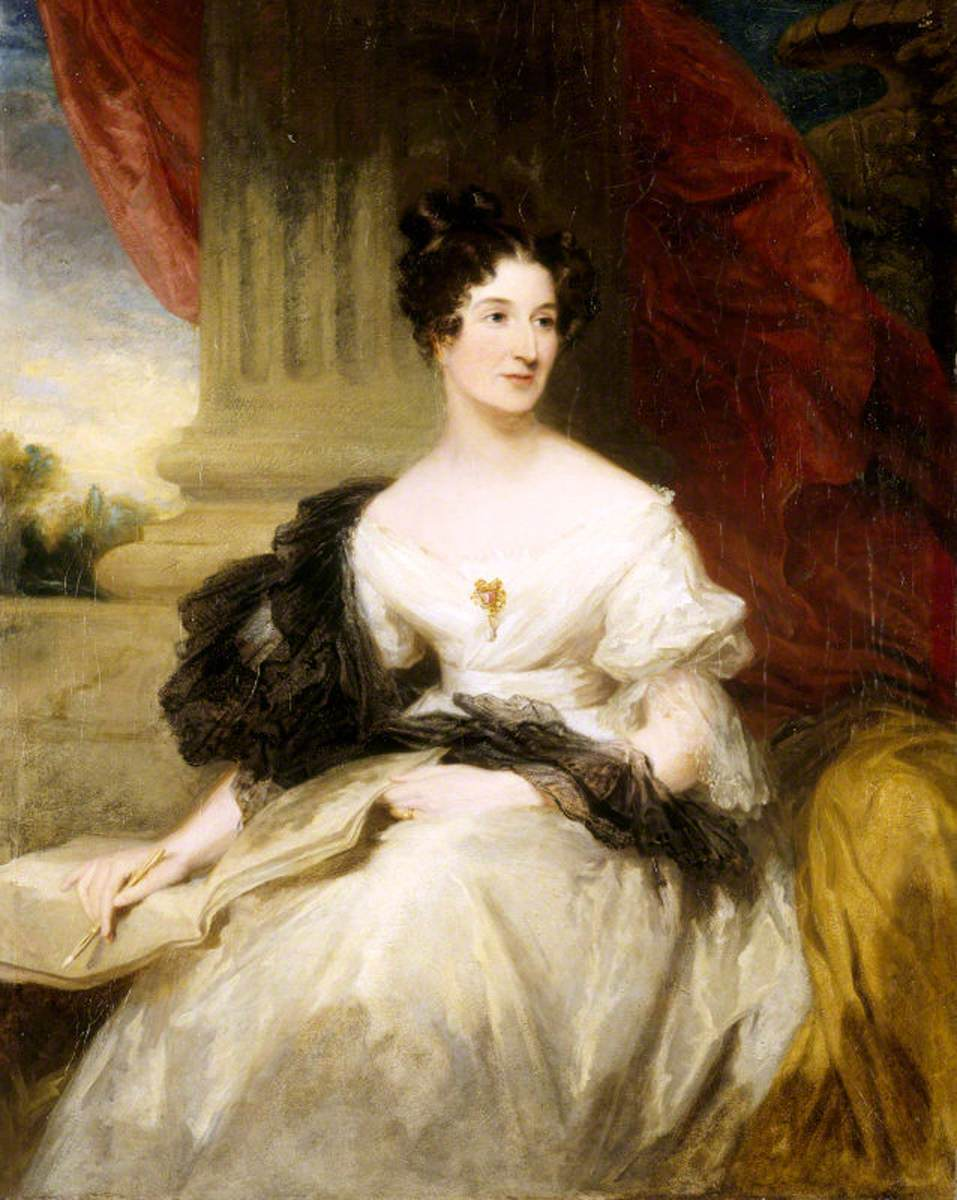
Lady Lucy Graham (1793–1875), Countess of Powis by Frederick Richard Say (1805-1868)

On 9 February 1818, Powis married Lady Lucy Graham, the daughter of James Graham, 3rd Duke of Montrose, and they had seven children, five boys and two girls:

- Edward Herbert, 3rd Earl of Powis (1818–1891), who died unmarried.
- Percy Egerton Herbert (1822–1876), who in 1860 married Lady Mary Petty-FitzMaurice, only child of Earl of Kerry, the eldest son of the 3rd Marquess of Lansdowne. They were the parents of the 4th Earl of Powis.
- George Herbert (1825–1894), who married Elizabeth Beatrice Sykes, fourth daughter of Sir Tatton Sykes, 4th Baronet, and Mary Anne Foulis (second daughter of Sir William Foulis, 7th Baronet), in 1863.
- Robert Charles Herbert (1827–1902), who married Anna Maria Cludde, only child and heiress of Edward Cludde and Catherine Harriett Cockburn (only daughter of Lt.-Gen. Sir William Cockburn, 6th Baronet), in 1854. He was the grandfather of the 5th and the 6th Earl of Powis.
- William Henry Herbert (1834–1909), who married Sybella Augusta Milbank, eldest daughter and coheiress of Mark William Vane Milbank (grandson of William Vane, 1st Duke of Cleveland) and Barbarina Sophia Farquhar (a daughter of Sir Thomas Farquhar, 2nd Baronet), in 1871.
- Lady Lucy Caroline Herbert (d. 1884), who married Frederick Calvert in 1865.
- Lady Charlotte Elizabeth Herbert (d. 1906), who married Hugh Montgomery in 1846.

The Earl of Powis died on 17 January 1848 at Powis Castle after being accidentally shot during a pheasant hunt by one of his sons, the Hon. George Herbert, later a clergyman and Dean of Hereford. He was buried at St Mary's Parish Church, Welshpool.

== Bibliography ==
- George E. Cokayne, The Complete Peerage, Vol X, St Catherine's Press, 1945.
- Craig, F. W. S. (1989) [1977]. British Parliamentary Election Results 1832–1885 (2nd ed.). Chichester: Parliamentary Research Services. p. 193. ISBN 0-900178-26-4.
- Gladstone, E.W. (1953). The Shropshire Yeomanry 1795–1945, The Story of a Volunteer Cavalry Regiment. The Whitethorn Press.
- Keeling-Roberts, Margaret (1981). In Retrospect: A Short History of The Royal Salop Infirmary. North Shropshire Printing Company. ISBN 0-9507849-0-7.
- Bryn Owen, History of the Welsh Militia and Volunteer Corps 1757–1908: Montgomeryshire Regiments of Militia, Volunteers and Yeomanry Cavalry, Wrexham: Bridge Books, 2000, ISBN 1-872424-85-6

Parliament of the United Kingdom
Preceded by: Richard Payne Knight; Robert Clive	Member of Parliament for Ludlow; 1806–1839	Succeeded by: Henry Salwey; Thomas Alcock
Honorary titles
Preceded by The Earl of Powis	Lord Lieutenant of Montgomeryshire; 1830–1848	Succeeded by The Lord Sudeley
Peerage of the United Kingdom
Preceded by Edward Clive	Earl of Powis; 1839–1848	Succeeded by Edward James Herbert
