= Rowland Hunt =

English politician (1858–1943)

Rowland Hunt (13 March 1858 – 30 November 1943) was an English politician. The Lord of the manor of Baschurch in Shropshire, he sat in the House of Commons from 1903 to 1918 as the Member of Parliament (MP) for Ludlow.

== Early life and family ==
Born at Market Harborough, Leicestershire, Hunt was the son of Rowland Hunt (1828–1878), of Boreatton Hall, Baschurch, Shropshire, and his wife Florence Marianne, daughter of Richard B. Humfrey, of Kibworth Hall, Leicestershire, and Stoke Albany House, Northamptonshire. The Hunts were one of the principal families of north Shropshire. Hunt's younger sister Agnes Hunt (1866–1948) worked with physically disabled people; his uncle George Ward Hunt was Chancellor of the Exchequer under Disraeli.

Hunt was educated at Eton and Magdalene College, Cambridge.

He served with Northamptonshire Militia for ten years, the Lovat Scouts during the Second Boer War, and later became a Major in the City of London Yeomanry in 1914 at the start of the First World War.

Hunt was a county cricketer for Shropshire, mainly as a wicket keeper, between 1879 and 1881. and later Master of Foxhounds of the Wheatland Hunt in Shropshire.

In 1890, Hunt married Georgina Veronica Davidson, daughter of Colonel Duncan Davidson of Tulloch Castle in Dingwall. They had two sons and one daughter. He later married Harriette Evelyn Hunt.

== Political career ==
Jasper More, the Liberal Unionist MP for Ludlow, died in November 1903. Hunt was selected by the Ludlow constituency's Conservatives and its Liberal Unionists as the joint Unionist candidate for the resulting by-election. He then briefly joined the National Party in 1917, then the Conservatives.

During a parliamentary debate on the bill which became the Representation of the People Act 1918, he opposed the extension of the voting franchise to women:

"There are obvious disadvantages about having women in Parliament. I do not know what is going to be done about their hats. How is a poor little man to get on with a couple of women wearing enormous hats in front of him?"

Hunt was also antisemitic, believing a Jewish plutocracy was secretly conspiring to subvert political life.

In local government, Hunt was one of the founder members of Shropshire County Council in 1889. He was appointed a Justice of the Peace in 1880 and Deputy-Lieutenant in 1931 for the county of Shropshire.

He died at Lindley Green, Broseley, Shropshire, in November 1943 aged 85.

Parliament of the United Kingdom
Preceded by Jasper More	Member of Parliament for Ludlow; 1903–1918	Succeeded by Sir Beville Stanier, Bt
