= George Windsor =

George Windsor may refer to:

- George V (1865–1936; r. 1910–1936), King of the United Kingdom and founder of the House of Windsor
- George VI (1895–1952; r. 1936–1952), King of the United Kingdom and member of the House of Windsor
- Prince George, Duke of Kent (1902–1942), fourth son of George V and member of the House of Windsor
- George Windsor, Earl of St Andrews (born 1962), British philanthropist
- Prince George of Wales (born 2013), grandson of Charles III and member of the House of Windsor

== See also ==
- George Windsor-Clive (disambiguation)
- George Windsor Earl (1813–1865), British navigator
