= Cantlin Stone =

Memorial stone near the Wales–England border

Coordinates: 52°28′28.48″N 3°10′31.75″W

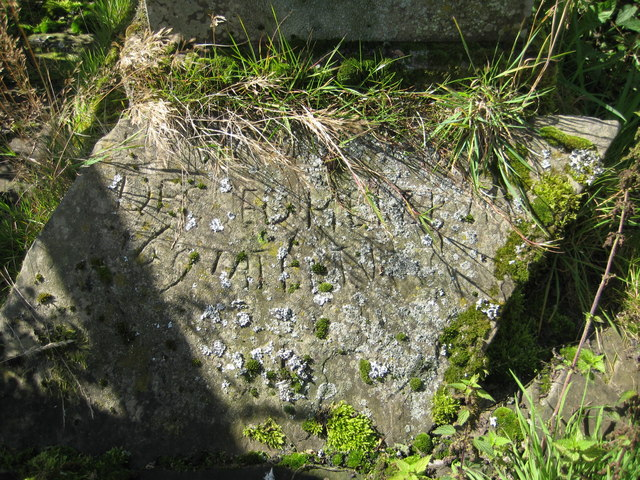
The Cantlin Stone

The Cantlin Stone is a rough stone approximately two feet across with an inscription recording the death of one Willam Cantlin there, and the fact that he was buried at Bettws. It is accompanied by a cross and is located only twenty or so yards away from the Wales–England border.

== History ==
The stone was placed on the hill as a commemoration to a pedlar named William Cantlin (Originally Cantrell), who mysteriously died on the hill in January 1691. It is said that he was robbed and murdered, but there are also versions of the story in which he dies of hypothermia or a heart attack. There was a dispute between Bettws-y-Crwyn parish and Kerry parish as to who should bury the body. Bettws buried him in the end, but claimed the ground where he lay.

The incident came to public attention in 1875, when the Clun Forest Enclosure Act was passed, the parish maintained its claim of the ground with proof of the burial and was subsequently awarded "several hundred acres more" to its territory.

Cantrell over time has turned into Cantlin. The name Cantrell is said to be a compound of Can't and Tell, because the parish did not want to bury a nameless man. The story has been passed down from generation to generation of people in the area.

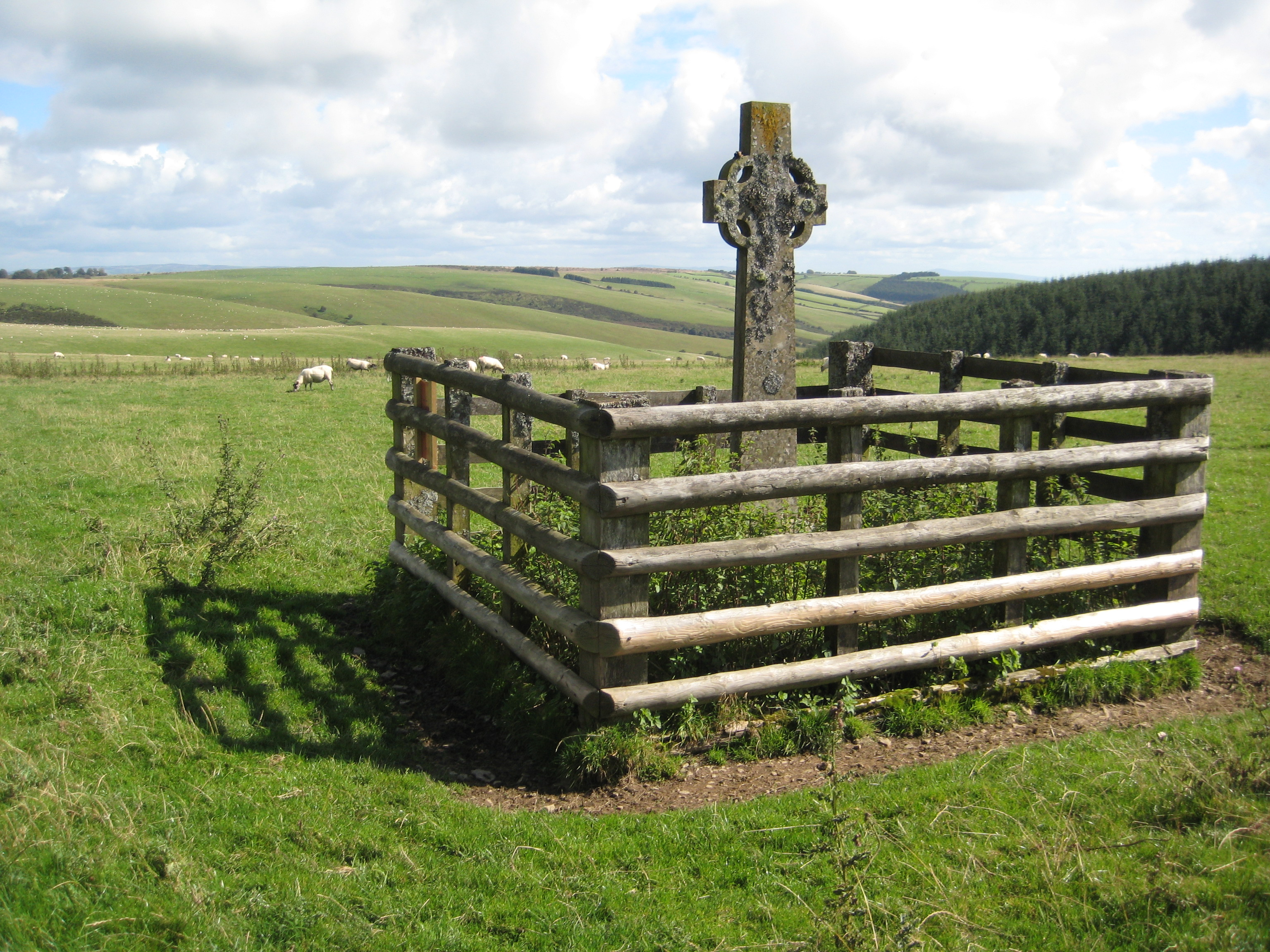
The new cross in 2010

In 1858, the Ludlow M.P. Beriah Botfield erected a limestone cross next to the original stone to commemorate the pedlar. This cross fell in 1970, and was left broken in pieces until 2000 when a grant was obtained from South Shropshire District Council to erect a new cross. The replica cross was carved in Yorkstone by Jonathan Bower Protheroe. The pieces of the old cross were laid across the unmarked grave at Bettws-y-Crwyn church thought to be the pedlar's grave.

== Cantlin Stone Free Festival ==
From 1980 to 1990 a free festival was held at the stone, but was moved to Llanbister in 1991.

== See also ==
- Listed buildings in Newcastle on Clun
- Media related to Cantlin Stone at Wikimedia Commons
