= Thomas Alcock (MP) =

British politician

Thomas Alcock (19 August 1801 – 22 August 1866) was a British Member of Parliament for 24 years non-consecutively, a progressive Liberal on questions of expansion of the popular ballot he was also an established church benefactor.

Alcock was born in Putney, son of Joseph Alcock of Roehampton then in the same parish. His father, a clerk at the Treasury, was a nephew of Sir Joseph Mawbey. Thomas siblings included Maria, who was married to the Reverend Brymer Belcher, and Letitia who married Charles Parke of Henbury, Dorset. Two brothers, Joseph and John predeceased him. He was schooled at Harrow and served briefly in the 1st Dragoon Guards and then in the 24th Dragoons on half-pay before retiring in 1832. In 1828-9 he travelled in Russia, Turkey, Persia and Greece, and later had an account of his travels privately printed.

He was a Member of Parliament (MP) for the rotten borough of Newton, Lancashire between 1826 and 1830, and after the Great Reform Act, sat for Ludlow, Shropshire from 1839 to 1840, and having lost elections such as the 1841 East Surrey by-election served that seat from 1847 to 1865. He was appointed High Sheriff of Surrey for 1837.

Alcock was politically progressive and in favour of extending the franchise. He spent more than £40,000 on building churches, parsonages and schools, and the endowment of churches, in Surrey and Lincolnshire. He was a strong advocate for the preservation of commons and open spaces for the use and recreation of the public, and published a pamphlet on the subject in 1845.

He was also responsible for extensively remodelling the mansion of Kingswood Warren in Surrey, to the designs of the architect T.R. Knowles. He died on 22 August 1866 at Great Malvern, Worcestershire, aged 65. His probate was resworn May 1892, under £90,000, implying he left at least £80,000 (equivalent to about £9,400,000 in 2023).

Parliament of the United Kingdom
Preceded by Sir Robert Townsend-Farquhar; Thomas Legh	Member of Parliament for Newton; 1826–1830; With: Thomas Legh	Succeeded by Thomas Claughton; Thomas Legh
Preceded by Viscount Clive; Henry Salwey	Member of Parliament for Ludlow; 1839–1840; With: Henry Salwey	Succeeded by Beriah Botfield; Henry Salwey
Preceded by Sir Edmund Antrobus; Henry Kemble	Member of Parliament for East Surrey; 1847–1865; With: Peter John Locke King	Succeeded by Peter John Locke King; Charles Buxton
Honorary titles
Preceded by William Henry Cooper	High Sheriff of Surrey; 1837	Succeeded by Thomas-Chaloner Bisse-Challoner
