= Ludlow (constituency) =

Parliamentary constituency in the UK

- Former county constituency for the House of Commons
- 2010–2024 boundary of Ludlow in Shropshire

- Location of Shropshire within England
- County: Shropshire
- Electorate: 66,199 (December 2010)
- Major settlements: Ludlow, Bridgnorth

1885–2024
- Seats: One
- Created from: Ludlow, Bridgnorth and South Shropshire
- Replaced by: South Shropshire

1473–1885
- Seats: 1473–1868: Two; 1868–1885: One
- Type of constituency: Borough constituency
- Created from: Shropshire
- Replaced by: Ludlow

Ludlow was a constituency (Note: A county constituency (for the purposes of election expenses and type of returning officer).) in Shropshire represented in the House of Commons of the UK Parliament. (Note: As with all UK Parliament constituencies, the constituency elects one Member of Parliament (MP) by the first past the post system of election at least every five years.)

Under the 2023 Periodic Review of Westminster constituencies, the constituency was abolished. Subject to minor boundary changes, it was reformed as South Shropshire, first contested in the 2024 general election.

== History ==
From its 1473 creation until 1885, Ludlow was a parliamentary borough. (Note: From 1473 to 1707 of the House of Commons of England, then of the House of Commons of Great Britain from 1707 to 1800, and of the House of Commons of the United Kingdom from 1801.) It was represented by two burgesses until 1868, when it was reduced to one member.

The seat saw a big reduction in voters between 1727 when 710 people voted to the next contested election in 1812 when the electorate was below 100. The Reform Act 1832 (2 & 3 Will. 4. c. 45) raised the electorate to 300-400.

The parliamentary borough was abolished in 1885, and the name transferred to the new county "division" (with lower electoral candidates' expenses and a different returning officer) whose boundaries were expanded greatly to become similar to (and a replacement to) the Southern division of Shropshire. (Note: A separate seat from 1832 to 1885.)

The seat was long considered safe for the Conservatives with the party winning by large majorities from the 1920s until 1997 when the majority was reduced to under 6,000. When the sitting Conservative MP stood down in 2001 it was won by a Liberal Democrat. Ludlow was regained by a Conservative in the 2005 general election, held with a greatly increased majority five years later which was almost doubled in 2015.

In the 2016 referendum on the UK's membership of the European Union, Shropshire, which the constituency entirely forms a part of, voted to leave the European Union by 56.9%.

== Boundaries and profile ==
Map of boundaries 2010–2024

1885–1918: Parts of the Boroughs of Ludlow, Bridgnorth, and Wenlock, the Sessional Divisions of Bishop's Castle, Brinstree South and Stottesden Chelmarsh, Burford, Clun and Purslow, Munslow Lower and Upper, and Stottesden Cleobury, and parts of the Sessional Divisions of Ovens and Stottesden.

1918–1950: The Boroughs of Ludlow, Bridgnorth, and Bishop's Castle, the Urban District of Church Stretton, and the Rural Districts of Bridgnorth, Burford, Church Stretton, Cleobury Mortimer, Clun, Ludlow, and Teme.

1950–1974: The Boroughs of Ludlow, Bridgnorth, Bishop's Castle, and Wenlock, the Urban District of Church Stretton, and the Rural Districts of Bridgnorth, Clun, and Ludlow.

1974–1983: The Rural Districts of Bridgnorth, Clun and Bishop's Castle, and Ludlow.

1983–1997: The District of South Shropshire, and the District of Bridgnorth.

1997–2010: The District of South Shropshire, and the District of Bridgnorth wards of Alveley, Bridgnorth Castle, Bridgnorth East, Bridgnorth Morfe, Bridgnorth West, Broseley, Claverley, Ditton Priors, Glazeley, Harrington, Highley, Kinlet, Much Wenlock, Morville, Stottesdon, and Worfield.

2010–2024: The District of South Shropshire, and the District of Bridgnorth wards of Alveley, Bridgnorth Castle, Bridgnorth East, Bridgnorth Morfe, Bridgnorth West, Broseley East, Broseley West, Claverley, Ditton Priors, Glazeley, Harrington, Highley, Much Wenlock, Morville, Stottesdon, and Worfield.

nb. in April 2009 the districts of South Shropshire and Bridgnorth (together with their wards) were abolished; the constituency's extent was still constituted by reference to them.

The Ludlow constituency was situated entirely within the county of Shropshire in England.

It covered a large, rural area dotted with market towns, the largest of which are Ludlow and Bridgnorth (which was a borough constituency until 1885), each having a population of just over 10,000. The other towns — all with a population of under 5,000 — are Broseley, Clun, Bishop's Castle (a 'rotten borough' constituency until 1832), Cleobury Mortimer, Much Wenlock (former seat of the borough constituency of Wenlock until 1885 and notable for its part in the history of the modern Olympic Games movement), Craven Arms and Church Stretton.

On its northeast border (just beyond Broseley) is the Ironbridge Gorge (notable for its part in the Industrial Revolution), just to the south of the large new town of Telford. The Guardian encapsulates the seat in a nutshell as "Big, rural, hills and small towns, increasingly middle class." Other than the Telford borough constituency, Ludlow borders onto similarly rural county constituencies, including Montgomery on the other side of the border with Wales.

The constituency covered most of the south area of Shropshire Council (without Shifnal and Albrighton). (Note: Prior to the 2009 re-organisation of local government in Shropshire, it comprised the former South Shropshire district together with the southern part of the former Bridgnorth district.)

The most recent boundary changes took place at the 1997 general election, when a part of the Bridgnorth district was removed to The Wrekin constituency.

== Members of Parliament ==
=== MPs 1473–1660 ===
- Constituency created (1473)

Parliament	First member	Second member
1510–1515	No names known	
1523	?William Foxe	?John Cother
1529	William Foxe	John Cother
1536	William Foxe	?John Cother
1539	Charles Foxe	Thomas Wheeler
1542	Charles Foxe	Edmund Foxe
1545	John Bradshaw	Thomas Wheeler
1547	Robert Blount	Charles Foxe
1553 (Mar)	Thomas Wheeler	Charles Foxe
1553 (Oct)	Thomas Wheeler	John Passey
1554 (Apr)	Sir John Price	Thomas Blashefield
1554 (Nov)	James Warnecombe	John Allsop
1555	William Heath	Thomas Croft
1558	Richard Prince	Robert Mason
1559	William Poughmill	Robert Mason I
1562–3	Richard Langford	William Poughmill
1571	William Poughmill	Robert Mason I
1572	William Poughmill	Robert Mason II, died and replaced Jan 1581 by Philip Sidney who sat for Shrewsbury and was replaced by Robert Berry
1584	Robert Berry	Richard Farr
1586	Robert Berry	Thomas Canland
1588	Robert Berry	Thomas Canland
1593	Robert Berry	Thomas Canland
1597	Hugh Sanford, election declared void and replaced 1597 by Robert Berry	Thomas Canland
1601	Thomas Canland	Robert Berry
1604	Robert Berry	Richard Benson
1614	Sir Henry Townshend	Robert Berry unseated on petition- replaced by Robert Lloyd
1621	Henry Spencer, Lord Compton	Richard Tomlins
1624	Richard Tomlins	Ralph Goodwin
1625	Richard Tomlins	Ralph Goodwin
1626	Richard Tomlins	Ralph Goodwin
1628	Richard Tomlins	Ralph Goodwin
1629–1640	No Parliaments summoned	
1640 (Apr)	Charles Baldwin	Ralph Goodwin
1640 (Nov)	Charles Baldwin	Ralph Goodwin
1645	Thomas Mackworth	Thomas Moor
1648	Thomas Mackworth	Thomas Moor
1653	Ludlow not represented in Barebones Parliament	
1654	John Aston	(one seat only)
1656	John Aston	(one seat only)
1659	Job Charlton	Samuel Baldwyn

=== MPs 1660–1868 ===
Year	First member	First party	Second member	Second party
1660	Timothy Littleton		Job Charlton	
1670	Somerset Fox		Job Charlton	
Febr. 1679	Somerset Fox		Francis Charlton	
Sept. 1679	Thomas Walcot		Francis Charlton	
1681	Charles Baldwyn		Francis Charlton	
Apr. 1685	Sir Edward Herbert		William Charlton	
Jn. 1685	Sir Edward Herbert		Sir Josiah Child	
Nov. 1685	Sir Edward Lutwyche		Sir Josiah Child	
1689	Francis Herbert		Charles Baldwyn	
1690	Thomas Hanmer		William Gower	
1691	Silius Titus		Francis Lloyd	
1695	Thomas Newport		Charles Baldwyn	
1698	Francis Herbert		William Gower	
1699	Francis Herbert		Thomas Newport	
Jan. 1701	Sir Thomas Powys		William Gower	
Dec. 1701	Sir Thomas Powys		Francis Herbert	
1705	Sir Thomas Powys		Acton Baldwyn	
1713	Humphrey Walcot		Acton Baldwyn	
1715	Humphrey Walcot		Francis Herbert	
1719	Humphrey Walcot		Sir Robert Raymond	
1722	Abel Ketelby		Acton Baldwyn	
Febr. 1727	Abel Ketelby		Richard Herbert	
Sept. 1727	Henry Herbert		Richard Herbert	
1741	Henry Herbert		Sir William Corbet, Bt	
1743	Richard Herbert		Sir William Corbet, Bt	
1748	Richard Herbert		Henry Bridgeman	
1754	Edward Herbert		Henry Bridgeman	
1768	Edward Herbert		William Fellowes	
1770	Thomas Herbert		William Fellowes	
1774	George Mason-Villiers	Tory	Edward Clive	Tory
1780	Frederick Cornewall	Tory	Edward Clive	Tory
1783	Somerset Davies	Tory	Edward Clive	Tory
1784	Richard Payne Knight	Whig	Edward Clive	Tory
1794	Richard Payne Knight	Whig	Robert Clive	Tory
1806	Edward Herbert	Tory	Robert Clive	Tory
1807	Edward Herbert	Tory	Henry Clive	Tory
1818	Edward Herbert	Tory	Robert Clive	Tory
1832	Edward Herbert	Tory	Edward Romilly	Whig
1834	Edward Herbert	Conservative	Edward Romilly	Whig
1835	Edward Herbert	Conservative	Edmund Lechmere Charlton	Conservative
1837	Edward Herbert	Conservative	Henry Salwey	Whig
1839	Thomas Alcock	Whig	Henry Salwey	Whig
1840	Beriah Botfield	Conservative	Henry Salwey	Whig
1841	Beriah Botfield	Conservative	James Ackers	Conservative
1847	Henry Bayley Clive	Conservative	Henry Salwey	Whig
1852	Hon. Robert Windsor-Clive	Conservative	Lord William Powlett	Conservative
1854	Percy Egerton Herbert	Conservative	Lord William Powlett	Conservative
1857	Percy Egerton Herbert	Conservative	Beriah Botfield	Conservative
1860	George Windsor-Clive	Conservative	Beriah Botfield	Conservative
1863	George Windsor-Clive	Conservative	Sir William Fraser	Conservative
1865	George Windsor-Clive	Conservative	John Edmund Severne	Conservative

=== MPs 1868–1885 ===
- Constituency reduced to one Member (1868)
- 1868–1885 George Windsor-Clive,
- Constituency reorganized (1885)

=== MPs since 1885 ===
Year	Member	Whip
1885	Jasper More	Liberal
1886	Jasper More	Liberal Unionist
1903	Rowland Hunt	Liberal Unionist
1917	Rowland Hunt	National Party
1918	Rowland Hunt	Unionist
1918	Sir Beville Stanier	Unionist
1922	Ivor Windsor-Clive	Unionist
1923	George Windsor-Clive	Unionist
1945	Uvedale Corbett	Conservative
1951	Christopher Holland-Martin	Conservative
1960	Jasper More	Conservative
1979	Eric Cockeram	Conservative
1987	Christopher Gill	Conservative
2001	Matthew Green	Liberal Democrat
2005	Philip Dunne	Conservative
2024	Constituency abolished	

== Election results 1918–2024 ==
=== Elections in the 1910s ===
General election 1918: Ludlow
Party		Candidate	Votes	%	±%
C	Unionist	Beville Stanier	Unopposed		
	Unionist hold				
C indicates candidate endorsed by the coalition government.

=== Elections in the 1920s ===
1922 Ludlow by-election
Party		Candidate	Votes	%	±%
C	Unionist	Ivor Windsor-Clive	Unopposed		
	Unionist hold				
C indicates candidate endorsed by the coalition government.

General election 1922: Ludlow
Party	Candidate	Votes	%	±%
Unionist	Ivor Windsor-Clive	11,785	66.4	N/A
National Liberal	Edward Calcott Pryce	5,979	33.7	N/A
Majority		5,808	32.7	N/A
Turnout		17,764	71.6	N/A
Unionist hold		Swing		

1923 Ludlow by-election
Party	Candidate	Votes	%	±%
Unionist	George Windsor-Clive	9,956	55.0	−11.4
Liberal	Edward Calcott Pryce	6,740	37.2	+3.5
Labour	Percy F. Pollard	1,420	7.8	New
Majority		3,216	17.8	−14.9
Turnout		18,116	73.0	+1.4
Unionist hold		Swing	−7.5	

General election 1923: Ludlow
Party	Candidate	Votes	%	±%
Unionist	George Windsor-Clive	Unopposed		
Unionist hold				

General election 1924: Ludlow
Party	Candidate	Votes	%	±%
Unionist	George Windsor-Clive	Unopposed		
Unionist hold				

General election 1929: Ludlow
Party	Candidate	Votes	%	±%
Unionist	George Windsor-Clive	14,066	57.1	N/A
Labour	T. Hardwick	5,323	21.6	N/A
Liberal	Arthur Alan Hanbury-Sparrow	5,259	21.3	N/A
Majority		8,743	35.5	N/A
Turnout		24,648	76.5	N/A
Unionist hold		Swing	N/A	

=== Elections in the 1930s ===
General election 1931: Ludlow
Party	Candidate	Votes	%	±%
Conservative	George Windsor-Clive	19,700	80.8	+23.7
Labour	T. Hardwick	4,683	19.2	−2.4
Majority		15,017	61.6	+26.1
Turnout		24,383	74.4	−2.1
Conservative hold		Swing		

General election 1935: Ludlow
Party	Candidate	Votes	%	±%
Conservative	George Windsor-Clive	16,355	72.7	−8.1
Labour	T. Hardwick	6,151	27.3	+8.1
Majority		10,204	45.4	−16.2
Turnout		22,501	67.9	−6.5
Conservative hold		Swing		

General election 1939–40: Another general election was required to take place before the end of 1940. The political parties had been making preparations for an election to take place from 1939 and by the end of this year, the following candidates had been selected;

- Conservative: George Windsor-Clive
- Liberal:
- Labour:

=== Elections in the 1940s ===
General election 1945: Ludlow
Party	Candidate	Votes	%	±%
Conservative	Uvedale Corbett	13,928	54.4	−18.3
Labour	Aneurin Glanmor Parry-Jones	6,358	24.8	−2.5
Liberal	C. Grant Cameron	4,307	16.8	New
Agriculturalist	Charles E. Edwards	989	3.9	New
Majority		7,570	29.6	−15.8
Turnout		25,582	71.1	+3.2
Conservative hold		Swing		

=== Elections in the 1950s ===
General election 1950: Ludlow
Party	Candidate	Votes	%	±%
Conservative	Uvedale Corbett	22,340	60.52	
Labour	I. A. Jack Williams	14,573	39.48	
Majority		7,767	21.04	
Turnout		36,913	79.92	
Conservative hold		Swing		

General election 1951: Ludlow
Party	Candidate	Votes	%	±%
Conservative	Christopher Holland-Martin	22,073	60.20	
Labour	Reginald J. Barker	14,596	39.80	
Majority		7,477	20.40	
Turnout		36,669	77.74	
Conservative hold		Swing		

General election 1955: Ludlow
Party	Candidate	Votes	%	±%
Conservative	Christopher Holland-Martin	20,816	61.67	
Labour	Reginald J. Barker	12,937	38.33	
Majority		7,879	23.34	
Turnout		33,753	71.75	
Conservative hold		Swing		

General election 1959: Ludlow
Party	Candidate	Votes	%	±%
Conservative	Christopher Holland-Martin	21,464	60.3	−1.4
Labour	John Garwell	14,138	39.7	+1.4
Majority		7,326	20.6	−2.7
Turnout		35,602	76.2	+4.5
Conservative hold		Swing		

=== Elections in the 1960s ===
1960 Ludlow by-election
Party	Candidate	Votes	%	±%
Conservative	Jasper More	13,777	46.4	−13.9
Liberal	Denis G. Rees	8,127	27.3	New
Labour	John Garwell	7,812	26.3	−13.4
Majority		5,650	19.1	−1.5
Turnout		29,716	63.7	−12.5
Conservative hold		Swing	−20.6	

General election 1964: Ludlow
Party	Candidate	Votes	%	±%
Conservative	Jasper More	17,290	47.0	−13.3
Labour	Michael K. Prendergast	10,763	29.2	−10.5
Liberal	John Griffiths	8,768	23.8	N/A
Majority		6,527	17.8	−2.8
Turnout		36,821	77.55	+1.3
Conservative hold		Swing	−1.4	

General election 1966: Ludlow
Party	Candidate	Votes	%	±%
Conservative	Jasper More	19,603	54.87	+7.92
Labour	John Gilbert	16,123	45.13	+15.90
Majority		3,480	9.74	−7.98
Turnout		35,726	73.86	−1.49
Conservative hold		Swing	−3.99	

=== Elections in the 1970s ===
General election 1970: Ludlow
Party	Candidate	Votes	%	±%
Conservative	Jasper More	22,104	54.78	−0.09
Labour	David Nagington	12,800	31.72	−13.41
Liberal	Christopher R. Oddie	5,444	13.49	New
Majority		9,304	23.06	+13.32
Turnout		40,348	73.27	−0.59
Conservative hold		Swing	+6.66	

General election February 1974: Ludlow
Party	Candidate	Votes	%	±%
Conservative	Jasper More	18,674	48.64	−6.12
Liberal	E. Robinson	10,687	27.83	+14.34
Labour	Geoffrey Martin	9,035	23.53	−7.19
Majority		7,987	20.81	−2.25
Turnout		38,396	79.55	+7.28
Conservative hold		Swing	−10.23	

General election October 1974: Ludlow
Party	Candidate	Votes	%	±%
Conservative	Jasper More	17,124	47.09	−1.55
Liberal	E. Robinson	10,888	29.94	+2.11
Labour	John Marek	8,353	22.97	−0.56
Majority		6,236	17.15	−3.66
Turnout		36,365	74.79	−4.66
Conservative hold		Swing	−1.83	

General election 1979: Ludlow
Party	Candidate	Votes	%	±%
Conservative	Eric Cockeram	20,906	52.78	+5.69
Liberal	E. Robinson	12,524	31.62	+1.68
Labour	I. K. Wymer	5,717	14.43	−8.54
National Front	R. J. Adshead	354	0.89	New
Independent	F. Turner	106	0.27	New
Majority		8,382	21.16	+4.01
Turnout		39,607	78.57	+2.78
Conservative hold		Swing	+2.01	

=== Elections in the 1980s ===
General election 1983: Ludlow
Party	Candidate	Votes	%	±%
Conservative	Eric Cockeram	26,278	55.7	+2.9
SDP	David Lane	14,975	31.7	+0.1
Labour	Philip Davis	5,949	12.6	−1.8
Majority		11,303	24.0	+2.8
Turnout		47,652	74.6	−4.0
Conservative hold		Swing	+1.4	

General election 1987: Ludlow
Party	Candidate	Votes	%	±%
Conservative	Christopher Gill	27,499	53.9	−1.8
Liberal	Ivor Phillips	15,800	31.0	−0.7
Labour	Keith Harrison	7,724	15.1	+2.5
Majority		11,699	22.9	−1.1
Turnout		51,023	77.1	+3.5
Conservative hold		Swing	−0.5	

=== Elections in the 1990s ===
General election 1992: Ludlow
Party	Candidate	Votes	%	±%
Conservative	Christopher Gill	28,719	51.5	−2.4
Liberal Democrats	David Phillips	14,567	26.1	−4.9
Labour	Beryl Mason	11,709	21.0	+5.9
Green	Nick Appleton-Fox	758	1.4	New
Majority		14,152	25.4	+2.5
Turnout		55,753	80.9	+3.8
Conservative hold		Swing	+1.2	

General election 1997: Ludlow
Party	Candidate	Votes	%	±%
Conservative	Christopher Gill	19,633	42.4	−9.1
Liberal Democrats	Ian Huffer	13,724	29.7	+3.6
Labour	Nuala O'Kane	11,745	25.4	+4.4
Green	Tim Andrewes	798	1.7	+0.3
UKIP	Eric Freeman-Keel	385	0.8	New
Majority		5,909	12.7	−12.7
Turnout		46,285	75.5	−5.4
Conservative hold		Swing	−6.3	

=== Elections in the 2000s ===
General election 2001: Ludlow
Party	Candidate	Votes	%	±%
Liberal Democrats	Matthew Green	18,620	43.2	+13.5
Conservative	Martin Taylor-Smith	16,990	39.4	−3.0
Labour	Nigel Knowles	5,785	13.4	−12.0
Green	Jim Gaffney	871	2.0	+0.3
UKIP	Phil Gutteridge	858	2.0	+1.2
Majority		1,630	3.8	N/A
Turnout		43,124	67.9	−7.6
Liberal Democrats gain from Conservative		Swing	+8.3	

General election 2005: Ludlow
Party	Candidate	Votes	%	±%
Conservative	Philip Dunne	20,979	45.1	+5.7
Liberal Democrats	Matthew Green	18,952	40.7	−2.5
Labour	Nigel Knowles	4,974	10.7	−2.7
Green	Jim Gaffney	852	1.8	−0.2
UKIP	Michael Zuckerman	783	1.7	−0.3
Majority		2,027	4.4	N/A
Turnout		46,540	72.1	+4.2
Conservative gain from Liberal Democrats		Swing	+4.1	

=== Elections in the 2010s ===
General election 2010: Ludlow
Party	Candidate	Votes	%	±%
Conservative	Philip Dunne	25,720	52.8	+7.7
Liberal Democrats	Heather Kidd	15,971	32.8	−7.9
Labour	Tony Hunt	3,272	6.7	−4.0
UKIP	Christopher Gill	2,127	4.4	+2.7
BNP	Christina Evans	1,016	2.1	New
Green	Jacqui Morrish	447	0.9	−0.9
Monster Raving Loony	Alan Powell	179	0.4	New
Majority		9,749	20.0	+15.6
Turnout		48,732	73.1	+1.0
Conservative hold		Swing	+7.8	

General election 2015: Ludlow
Party	Candidate	Votes	%	±%
Conservative	Philip Dunne	26,093	54.3	+1.5
UKIP	David Kelly	7,164	14.9	+10.5
Liberal Democrats	Charlotte Barnes	6,469	13.5	−19.3
Labour	Simon Slater	5,902	12.3	+5.6
Green	Janet Phillips	2,435	5.1	+4.2
Majority		18,929	39.4	+19.4
Turnout		48,063	72.4	−0.7
Conservative hold		Swing	−4.5	

General election 2017: Ludlow
Party	Candidate	Votes	%	±%
Conservative	Philip Dunne	31,433	62.9	+8.6
Labour	Julia Buckley	12,147	24.3	+12.0
Liberal Democrats	Heather Kidd	5,336	10.7	−2.8
Green	Hilary Wendt	1,054	2.1	−3.0
Majority		19,286	38.6	−0.8
Turnout		49,970	73.4	+1.0
Conservative hold		Swing	−1.7	

General election 2019: Ludlow
Party	Candidate	Votes	%	±%
Conservative	Philip Dunne	32,185	64.1	+1.2
Liberal Democrats	Heather Kidd	8,537	17.0	+6.3
Labour	Kuldip Sahota	7,591	15.1	−9.2
Green	Hilary Wendt	1,912	3.8	+1.7
Majority		23,648	47.1	+8.5
Turnout		50,225	72.3	−1.1
Conservative hold		Swing	−2.6	

== Election results 1868–1918 ==
=== Elections in the 1860s ===
General election 1868: Ludlow
Party	Candidate	Votes	%	±%
Conservative	George Windsor-Clive	428	71.6	−4.8
Liberal	William Yardley	170	28.4	+4.9
Majority		258	43.2	+30.8
Turnout		598	75.8	−14.1
Registered electors		789		
Conservative hold		Swing	−4.9	

=== Elections in the 1870s ===
General election 1874: Ludlow
Party	Candidate	Votes	%	±%
Conservative	George Windsor-Clive	Unopposed		
Registered electors		840		
Conservative hold				

=== Elections in the 1880s ===
General election 1880: Ludlow
Party	Candidate	Votes	%	±%
Conservative	George Windsor-Clive	525	60.5	N/A
Liberal	Lewis E. Glyn	343	39.5	N/A
Majority		182	21.0	N/A
Turnout		868	87.8	N/A
Registered electors		989		
Conservative hold		Swing		

General election 1885: Ludlow
Party	Candidate	Votes	%	±%
Liberal	Jasper More	4,642	53.2	+13.7
Conservative	Bryan Leighton	4,078	46.8	−13.7
Majority		564	6.4	
Turnout		8,720	81.2	−6.6
Registered electors		10,735		
Liberal gain from Conservative		Swing	+13.7	

General election 1886: Ludlow
Party	Candidate	Votes	%	±%
Liberal Unionist	Jasper More	Unopposed		
Liberal Unionist gain from Liberal				

=== Elections in the 1890s ===
More

General election 1892: Ludlow
Party	Candidate	Votes	%	±%
Liberal Unionist	Jasper More	5,965	73.5	N/A
Liberal	Frederick Sydney Morris	2,146	26.5	N/A
Majority		3,819	47.0	N/A
Turnout		8,111	71.9	N/A
Registered electors		11,276		
Liberal Unionist hold		Swing	N/A	

General election 1895: Ludlow
Party	Candidate	Votes	%	±%
Liberal Unionist	Jasper More	Unopposed		
Liberal Unionist hold				

=== Elections in the 1900s ===
General election 1900: Ludlow
Party	Candidate	Votes	%	±%
Liberal Unionist	Jasper More	Unopposed		
Liberal Unionist hold				

1903 Ludlow by-election
Party	Candidate	Votes	%	±%
Liberal Unionist	Rowland Hunt	4,393	56.2	N/A
Liberal	Frederic Horne	3,423	43.8	N/A
Majority		970	12.4	N/A
Turnout		7,816	75.3	N/A
Registered electors		10,382		
Liberal Unionist hold		Swing	N/A	

General election 1906: Ludlow
Party	Candidate	Votes	%	±%
Liberal Unionist	Rowland Hunt	4,978	54.1	N/A
Liberal	Frederic Horne	4,218	45.9	N/A
Majority		760	8.2	N/A
Turnout		9,196	85.4	N/A
Registered electors		10,765		
Liberal Unionist hold		Swing	N/A	

=== Elections in the 1910s ===
General election January 1910: Ludlow
Party	Candidate	Votes	%	±%
Liberal Unionist	Rowland Hunt	5,769	63.2	+9.1
Liberal	George Frederick Forsdike	3,365	36.8	−9.1
Majority		2,404	26.4	+18.2
Turnout		9,134	86.7	+1.3
Registered electors		10,530		
Liberal Unionist hold		Swing	+9.1	

General election December 1910: Ludlow
Party	Candidate	Votes	%	±%
Liberal Unionist	Rowland Hunt	Unopposed		
Liberal Unionist hold				

General election 1914–15:

Another general election was required to take place before the end of 1915. The political parties had been making preparations for an election to take place and by July 1914, the following candidates had been selected;

- Unionist: Rowland Hunt
- Liberal:

== Election results 1832–1868 ==
=== Elections in the 1830s ===
General election 1832: Ludlow
Party	Candidate	Votes	%
Tory	Edward Herbert	198	29.7
Whig	Edward Romilly	185	27.7
Tory	Robert Clive	169	25.3
Whig	William Davies	115	17.2
Turnout		339	94.4
Registered electors		359	
Majority		13	2.0
Tory hold			
Majority		16	2.4
Whig gain from Tory			

General election 1835: Ludlow
Party	Candidate	Votes	%	±%
Conservative	Edward Herbert	234	42.8	+13.1
Conservative	Edmund Lechmere Charlton	159	29.1	+3.8
Whig	Edward Romilly	154	28.2	−16.7
Majority		5	0.9	−1.1
Turnout		332	92.2	−2.2
Registered electors		360		
Conservative hold		Swing	+10.7	
Conservative gain from Whig		Swing	+6.1	

General election 1837: Ludlow
Party	Candidate	Votes	%	±%
Conservative	Edward Herbert	193	35.8	−36.1
Whig	Henry Salwey	188	34.9	+20.8
Whig	Thomas Alcock	158	29.3	+15.2
Majority		5	0.9	±0.0
Turnout		351	93.6	+1.4
Registered electors		375		
Conservative hold		Swing	−36.1	
Whig gain from Conservative		Swing	+19.4	

Clive succeeded to the peerage, becoming 2nd Earl of Powis and causing a by-election.

By-election, 6 June 1839: Ludlow
Party	Candidate	Votes	%	±%
Whig	Thomas Alcock	186	50.5	−13.7
Conservative	Henry Clive	182	49.5	+13.7
Majority		4	1.0	
Turnout		368	91.1	−2.5
Registered electors		404		
Whig gain from Conservative		Swing	−13.7	

=== Elections in the 1840s ===
Alcock's election was declared void on petition, due to treating, on 12 May 1840, causing a by-election.

By-election, 23 May 1840: Ludlow
Party	Candidate	Votes	%	±%
Conservative	Beriah Botfield	194	54.8	+19.0
Whig	George Larpent	160	45.2	−19.0
Majority		34	9.6	+8.7
Turnout		354	83.9	−9.7
Registered electors		422		
Conservative hold		Swing	+19.0	

General election 1841: Ludlow
Party	Candidate	Votes	%	±%
Conservative	Beriah Botfield	222	37.2	+19.3
Conservative	James Ackers	219	36.7	+18.8
Whig	Henry Salwey	156	26.1	−38.1
Majority		63	10.6	+9.7
Turnout		372	89.6	−4.0
Registered electors		415		
Conservative hold		Swing	+19.2	
Conservative gain from Whig		Swing	+18.9	

General election 1847: Ludlow
Party	Candidate	Votes	%	±%
Conservative	Henry Bayley Clive	207	34.7	−2.0
Whig	Henry Salwey	206	34.6	+8.5
Conservative	Beriah Botfield	183	30.7	−6.5
Turnout		390 (est)	86.2 (est)	−3.4
Registered electors		452		
Majority		1	0.1	−10.5
Conservative hold		Swing	−3.1	
Majority		23	3.9	
Whig gain from Conservative		Swing	+8.5	

=== Elections in the 1850s ===
General election 1852: Ludlow
Party	Candidate	Votes	%	±%
Conservative	Robert Clive	250	40.3	+5.6
Conservative	William Powlett	214	34.5	+3.8
Whig	Henry Salwey	157	25.3	−9.3
Majority		57	9.2	+9.1
Turnout		389 (est)	86.4 (est)	+0.2
Registered electors		450		
Conservative hold		Swing	+5.1	
Conservative gain from Whig		Swing	+4.2	

Clive resigned to contest the 1854 by-election in South Shropshire, causing a by-election.

By-election, 7 February 1854: Ludlow
Party	Candidate	Votes	%	±%
Conservative	Percy Egerton Herbert	Unopposed		
Conservative hold				

General election 1857: Ludlow
Party	Candidate	Votes	%	±%
Conservative	Percy Egerton Herbert	Unopposed		
Conservative	Beriah Botfield	Unopposed		
Registered electors		407		
Conservative hold				
Conservative hold				

General election 1859: Ludlow
Party	Candidate	Votes	%	±%
Conservative	Percy Egerton Herbert	Unopposed		
Conservative	Beriah Botfield	Unopposed		
Registered electors		394		
Conservative hold				
Conservative hold				

=== Elections in the 1860s ===
Herbert resigned by accepting the office of Steward of the Chiltern Hundreds, causing a by-election.

By-election, 4 September 1860: Ludlow
Party	Candidate	Votes	%	±%
Conservative	George Windsor-Clive	Unopposed		
Conservative hold				

Botfield's death caused a by-election.

By-election, 28 August 1863: Ludlow
Party	Candidate	Votes	%	±%
Conservative	William Fraser	Unopposed		
Conservative hold				

General election 1865: Ludlow
Party	Candidate	Votes	%	±%
Conservative	George Windsor-Clive	236	40.5	N/A
Conservative	John Edmund Severne	209	35.9	N/A
Liberal	William Yardley	137	23.5	N/A
Majority		72	12.4	N/A
Turnout		360 (est)	89.9 (est)	N/A
Registered electors		400		
Conservative hold		Swing	N/A	
Conservative hold		Swing	N/A	

== Elections before 1832 ==
General election 1831: Ludlow
Party	Candidate	Votes	%
Tory	Edward Herbert	Unopposed	
Tory	Robert Clive	Unopposed	
Tory hold			
Tory hold			

General election 1830: Ludlow
Party	Candidate	Votes	%
Tory	Edward Herbert	Unopposed	
Tory	Robert Clive	Unopposed	
Tory hold			
Tory hold			

== See also ==
- Parliamentary constituencies in Shropshire

== Sources ==
- UK Polling Report Ludlow constituency
- The Guardian Ludlow constituency profile and election results
- Craig, F. W. S. (1989) [1977]. British parliamentary election results 1832–1885 (2nd ed.). Chichester: Parliamentary Research Services. pp. 193–194. ISBN 0-900178-26-4.
- Craig, F. W. S. (1989) [1974]. British parliamentary election results 1885–1918 (2nd ed.). Chichester: Parliamentary Research Services. p. 373. ISBN 0-900178-27-2.
- Craig, F. W. S. (1983) [1969]. British parliamentary election results 1918–1949 (3rd ed.). Chichester: Parliamentary Research Services. p. 450. ISBN 0-900178-06-X.
