= Edmund Lechmere Charlton =

British politician

Edmund Lechmere Charlton (20 September 1789 – 17 April 1845) was a British politician, MP for Ludlow 1835–1837.

Charlton was born on 20 September 1789, the son of Nicholas Lechmere Charlton MP and his wife Susanna, daughter of Jesson Case.

He matriculated at Christ Church, Oxford in 1807 aged 18, graduating M.A. in 1810. He was called to the bar at Lincoln's Inn in 1829.

Charlton considered standing in Ludlow in 1820, as an independent radical, but was persuaded to withdraw. In 1826 he stood in Ludlow, promising to present a petition to determine the constituency franchise and boundaries. He was defeated, after 12 of his 15 votes were rejected; he appealed by petition. Edward Rogers MP, the constituency returning officer, was offended by Charlton's public criticism of the Ludlow town corporation. Rogers challenged Charlton to a duel near Bath, which ended without bloodshed on 9 October 1826.

He was elected in Ludlow in 1835, serving in only one parliament. According to The History of Parliament, "his politics veered between radicalism and Conservatism". Stanley Leighton considered Charlton an "eccentric character".

In 1836, Charlton appeared in the Court of Chancery before Master in Chancery William Brougham as counsel to advocate a petition presented by himself and others, regarding the appointment of trustees to charities in Ludlow. He then sent a letter to Brougham, dated 24 October 1836. Lord Chancellor Cottenham considered the letter scandalous towards Brougham, and an improper attempt to influence his conduct. He ordered Charlton to attend the court to explain why he should not be committed to the Fleet Prison for contempt of court. Charlton did not attend on 22 November or 25 November, when the Lord Chancellor ordered his committal to the Fleet. Charlton evaded arrest until 3 February 1837, when he was taken to the Fleet. The Lord Chancellor ordered his release after three weeks.

Parliament of the United Kingdom
Preceded by Edward Herbert; Edward Romilly	Member of Parliament for Ludlow; 1835–1837; With: Edward Herbert	Succeeded by Edward Herbert; Henry Salwey
