= William Foxe =

16th-century English politician

Member of Parliament for Ludlow
- In office 1536
- Preceded by: Himself
- Succeeded by: Charles Foxe
- In office 1529
- Preceded by: Himself
- Succeeded by: Himself
- In office 1523
- Preceded by: Unknown
- Succeeded by: Himself

Personal details
- Born: 1479 or 1480
- Died: 1554 (aged 73–75)
- Spouse: Jane Downe
- Children: 10, including Charles and Edmund

William Foxe (1479/80 – 1554), of Stoke by Greet and St. John's Hospital, Ludlow, Shropshire, was an English politician.

== Family ==
Foxe was the eldest son of Edmund Foxe of Stoke by Greet and his wife Catherine née Pickenham, the daughter and coheiress of John Pickenham of Pickenham, Norfolk. Foxe married Jane Downe, a daughter of Richard Downe of Ludlow, Shropshire. They had four daughters and six sons, including MP, Charles and Edmund Foxe. His son-in-law, William Hopton, was made overseer of Foxe's will, alongside his son Charles Foxe and his wife Jane, who died in 1566, was his only excetrix. Foxe was buried in Ludford Church.

== Career ==
He was a Member (MP) of the Parliament of England for Ludlow in 1523, 1529 and 1536.

Parliament of England
Preceded by Unknown; Unknown	Member of Parliament for Ludlow; 1523; With: John Cother	Succeeded by William Foxe; John Cother
Preceded by William Foxe; John Cother	Member of Parliament for Ludlow; 1529; With: John Cother	Succeeded by William Foxe; John Cother
Preceded by William Foxe; John Cother	Member of Parliament for Ludlow; 1536; With: John Cother	Succeeded by Charles Foxe; Thomas Wheeler
