= Percy Egerton Herbert =

British Army general (1822–1876)

Lieutenant-General The Right Honourable Sir Percy Egerton Herbert KCB
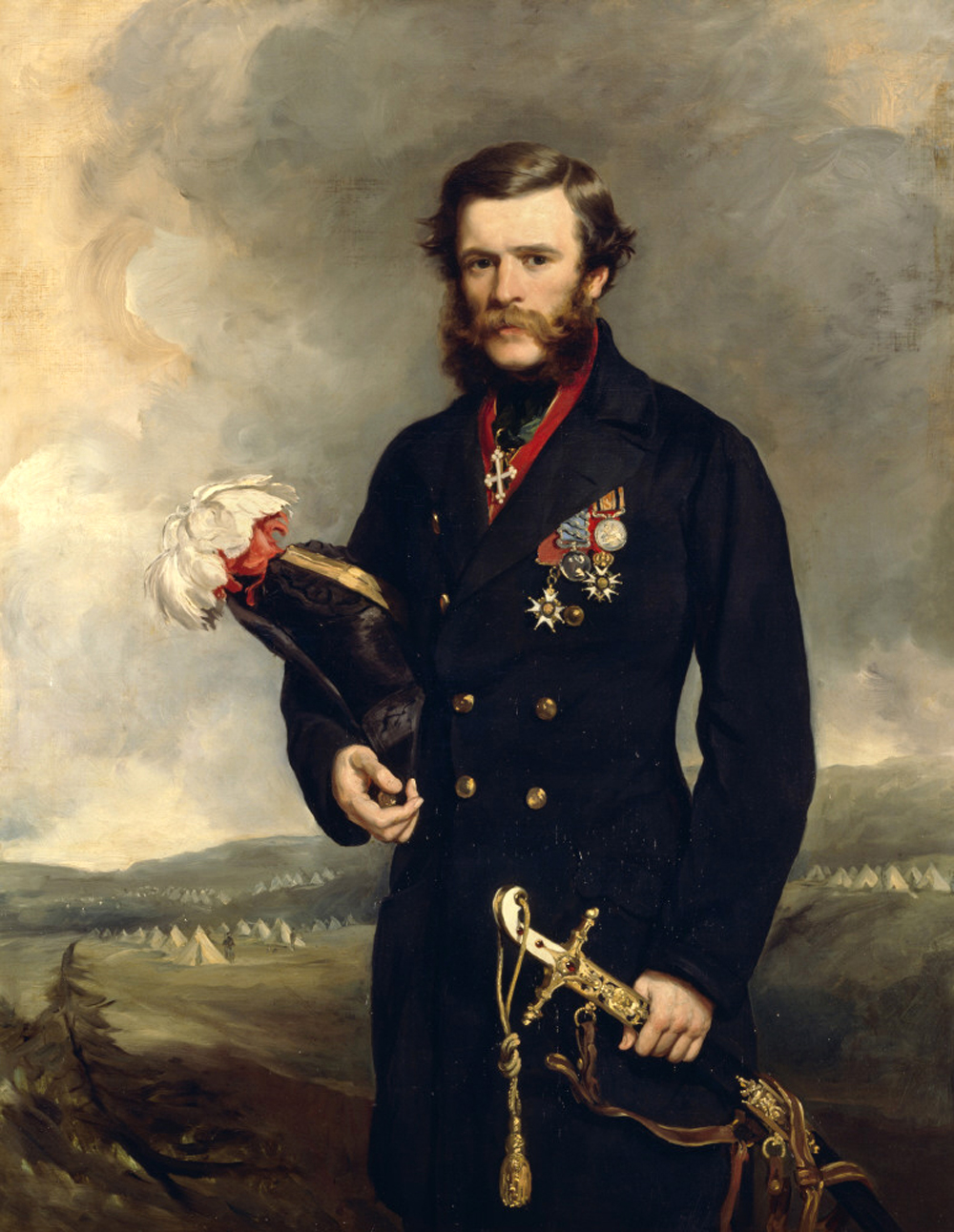
- Portrait by Francis Grant, 1857

Treasurer of the Household
- In office 27 February 1867 – 1 December 1868
- Monarch: Victoria
- Prime Minister: The Earl of Derby; Benjamin Disraeli
- Preceded by: Lord Burghley
- Succeeded by: The Lord de Tabley

Personal details
- Born: 15 April 1822 Powis Castle, near Welshpool, Wales
- Died: 7 October 1876 (aged 54) The Styche, Market Drayton, Shropshire
- Party: Conservative
- Spouse: Lady Mary Petty-FitzMaurice (d. 1927)
- Children: 4, including George
- Parent(s): Edward Herbert, 2nd Earl of Powis; Lady Lucy Graham
- Education: Royal Military College, Sandhurst

Lieutenant-General Sir Percy Egerton Herbert KCB PC (15 April 1822 – 7 October 1876) was a British Army officer and Conservative politician.

== Background and education ==
Herbert was born at Powis Castle, near Welshpool, the second son of Edward Herbert, 2nd Earl of Powis, grandson of Robert Clive, 1st Baron Clive. His mother was Edward's wife Lady Lucy Graham, third daughter of James Graham, 3rd Duke of Montrose. He was educated at Eton and the Royal Military College, Sandhurst.

== Military and political careers ==
Herbert was made an ensign in the 43rd (Monmouthshire) Light Infantry in January 1840, serving with them in the war on the Xhosa (1851–53), the Orange River Boers expedition, and the battle of Berea. He rose to lieutenant on 7 September 1841, captain on 19 June 1846, major on 27 May and lieutenant-colonel on 28 May 1853.

Herbert entered politics when he was returned for Ludlow, uncontested, in February 1854, holding the seat until he resigned in September 1860. He continued to serve in the army, being appointed assistant quartermaster-general of Sir De Lacy Evans's division of the army of the East. He landed in the Crimea in this staff position, receiving major wounds at the Battle of the Alma and the siege of Sevastopol and also serving at the Battle of Inkerman. He took over from Sir Richard Airey as quartermaster-general of the whole British army force from when Airey returned to England until the evacuation of the Crimea. For his services in the Crimean War he was made an aide-de-camp to Queen Victoria, a Companion of the Order of the Bath (CB) and a colonel (as a brevet rank, on 28 November 1854), and also received knighthoods from the Turkish, Sardinian and French governments.

On 19 February 1858 Herbert was made lieutenant-colonel of the 82nd (Prince of Wales's) Foot, joining that regiment at Cawnpore on 21 April 1858. He commanded the regiment's left wing in the Rohilkhand campaign (being present at the capture of Bareilly and Shahjahanpur) and then the Cawnpore and Fatehpur districts until spring 1859, as well as being sent to pursue Firuz Shah and a body of rebels on the banks of the river Jumna in December 1858. In September 1860 he left Parliament to become deputy quartermaster-general at the Horse Guards. He re-entered Parliament in April 1865 as Conservative MP for South Shropshire, holding the seat until February 1874. From 1865 to 1867 assistant quartermaster-general at Aldershot. In March 1867 he was sworn of the Privy Council and appointed Treasurer of the Household in Lord Derby Conservative administration, in which post he remained until December 1868, the last year under the premiership of Benjamin Disraeli. He was promoted to major-general in January 1868, was made a Knight Commander of the Order of the Bath (KCB) in 1869, and ultimately promoted lieutenant-general in September 1875.

== Marriage and issue ==
Herbert married Lady Mary Caroline Louisa Petty-Fitzmaurice, the only child of William Petty-FitzMaurice, Earl of Kerry, on 4 October 1860. They had four children:

- Henry Herbert (28 June 1861 – 8 August 1865).
- George Charles Herbert, 4th Earl of Powis (1862–1952), married the Honourable Violet Lane-Fox.
- Magdalen Herbert (28 July 1864 – 27 October 1957).
- Margaret Augusta Herbert (d. 7 July 1952), married Thomas Richard Cholmondeley (b. 1856, d. 7 Feb 1922).

Herbert died at The Styche, Market Drayton, Shropshire, in October 1876, aged 54, and was buried at Moreton Say. Lady Mary Herbert survived her husband by over 50 years and died in September 1927.

Parliament of the United Kingdom
Preceded by Robert Windsor-Clive; Lord William Powlett	Member of Parliament for Ludlow; 1854–1860; With: Lord William Powlett 1854–1857; Beriah Botfield 1857–60	Succeeded by George Windsor-Clive; Beriah Botfield
Preceded by Viscount Newport; Sir Baldwin Leighton, Bt	Member of Parliament for South Shropshire; 1865–1876; With: Sir Baldwin Leighton, Bt 1865; Jasper More 1865–1868; Edward Corbett 1868–1876	Succeeded by John Edmund Severne; Edward Corbett
Political offices
Preceded by Lord Burghley	Treasurer of the Household; 1867–1868	Succeeded by The Lord de Tabley
