= George Clive =

George Clive may refer to:

- George Clive (died 1779), MP for Bishop's Castle
- George Clive (Liberal politician) (1805–1880), politician, grandson of the above
- George Sidney Clive (1874–1959), soldier, Marshal of the Diplomatic Corps, grandson of the above

== See also ==
- George Windsor-Clive (disambiguation)
