= James Ackers =

British politician (1811–1868)

Member of Parliament for Ludlow
- In office 3 July 1841 – 31 July 1847 Serving with Beriah Botfield
- Preceded by: Beriah Botfield; Henry Salwey
- Succeeded by: Henry Bayley Clive; Henry Salwey

Personal details
- Born: 1811
- Died: 27 September 1868 (aged 56–57)
- Party: Conservative

James Ackers (1811 – 27 September 1868) was a British Conservative politician.

Ackers was elected Conservative Member of Parliament for Ludlow at the 1841 general election and held the seat until 1847 when he did not seek re-election.

Parliament of the United Kingdom
Preceded by Beriah Botfield; Henry Salwey	Member of Parliament for Ludlow; 1841–1847; With: Beriah Botfield	Succeeded by Henry Bayley Clive; Henry Salwey
