= Listed buildings in Newcastle on Clun =

Newcastle on Clun is a civil parish in Shropshire, England. It contains 28 listed buildings that are recorded in the National Heritage List for England. Of these, two are at Grade II*, the middle of the three grades, and the others are at Grade II, the lowest grade. The parish contains the village of Newcastle, part of the village of Whitcott Keysett, and the surrounding countryside. Most of the listed buildings are farmhouses, farm buildings, houses, and cottages, the earliest of which are timber framed. The other listed buildings are a church, a memorial in the churchyard, a lych gate, an inscribed stone and a cross, and a watermill.

== Key ==
Grade	Criteria
II*	Particularly important buildings of more than special interest
II	Buildings of national importance and special interest

== Buildings ==
Name and location	Photograph	Date	Notes	Grade
Lower Spoad Farmhouse and barn 52.43144°N 3.09420°W		14th or 15th century	Originally a timber framed building with cruck construction, it was later encased and extended in limestone, and has a slate roof. It has in part one storey, in other parts two storeys, and there are attics on both parts. The building has an L-shaped plan, with a main range of four bays, a cross-wing, a lean-to at the rear. The windows are casements, and there are at least four full cruck trusses internally.	II*
Barn adjoining Lower Spoad Farmhouse; 52.43150°N 3.09409°W	—	14th or 15th century (probable)	The barn has been altered and extended. It is timber framed with cruck construction, weatherboarding on the east gable, walls have been rebuilt and the eaves raised in limestone and concrete, and the roof is in slate and corrugated iron. There are two bays and lean-to aisles, and it contains two pairs of doors. Inside are two full cruck trusses.	II*
Bryn-y-Cagley Hall; 52.43824°N 3.06939°W	—	Late 16th or 17th century	The farmhouse, with probably a timber framed core, was later altered and extended. It is in limestone with a slate roof. There are two gables on the front, the left gable with pigeon-resting boxes. The main range has three bays, there is a two-storey extension on the left and a rear wing. The windows are a mix of casements and sashes.	II
Lake House; 52.43758°N 3.06900°W	—	16th or 17th century	The farmhouse has since been remodelled, it was refaced in 1737, and is in stone, probably on a timber framed core, and has a slate roof. There are two storeys and an attic, and an H-shaped plan consisting of a hall range and two projecting gabled cross-wings. The doorway has pilasters and a bracketed hood, and the windows are sashes.	II
Bryndrinog Farmhouse; 52.43557°N 3.09405°W		Early to mid 17th century	The farmhouse was altered later. It is timber framed with wattle and daub infill on a stone plinth and with an asbestos slate roof. There is one storey and an attic, the original range has two bays, a gabled cross-wing to the left, lean-tos on each side, and a 19th-century recessed and rendered wing to the right with a slate roof. The windows are casements, and there is a raking eaves dormer.	II
9 Whitcott Keysett; 52.43811°N 3.06947°W	—	17th century (probable)	The farmhouse was later remodelled. It is in a mix of limestone and sandstone, possibly on a timber framed core, and has a slate roof. There are two storeys, a main range with three bays and gabled cross-wings, and a single-storey extension in front of the left cross-wing. The windows are casements.	II
Barn west of Lake House; 52.43756°N 3.06920°W	—	17th century	The barn is timber framed with weatherboarding on a stone plinth, and it has a corrugated iron roof. Part of the barn has one storey and part has one storey and a loft, and there are five or six bays. It contains doors and a loft door.	II
Farm buildings, Newcastle Hall Farm; 52.43438°N 3.11027°W		Mid 17th century	Two ranges of farm buildings at right angles. The older is a timber framed barn with red brick nogging on a stone plinth with a slate roof. The other range dates from the late 18th century and consists of a barn and cowhouse in stone with weatherboarding on the gable end, and a roof in slate and corrugated iron.	II
Barn, Maes-yr-haen Farm; 52.44056°N 3.08252°W	—	Late 17th century	The barn was later extended. It is timber framed with weatherboarding on a limestone plinth, and has a corrugated iron roof. There is one storey with a later inserted floor, five bays, a rear outshut, and a lean-to on the right. In the ground floor are four doorways, and above are five loft doors.	II
The Rhoneth Farmhouse; 52.43722°N 3.07043°W	—	Late 17th century	The farmhouse has since been remodelled. It is in stone with a slate roof, and has two storeys. The farmhouse consists of a three-bay range and a cross-passage. The left block is timber framed with rendered infill, and partly refaced in limestone. The windows are casements, and there are two doorways, one with a gabled hood, and the other with a segmental head and a gabled porch.	II
Barn and Cowhouse, Upper Spoad Farm; 52.42822°N 3.10537°W	—	Late 17th century	The farm building is timber framed with weatherboarding on a limestone plinth, and has a corrugated iron roof. There are four bays, steps lead up to a doorway, and there are other doorways and pitching holes.	II
The Cantlin Stone and Botfield Cross; 52.47458°N 3.17549°W		1691	The stone is in limestone and is inscribed. The cross was added in 1858, and consists of a Celtic cross on a chamfered stepped base.	II
The Mill; 52.43270°N 3.10635°W	—	Early 18th century (probable)	A limestone cottage, rendered at the rear, with a slate roof. It has one storey and an attic, two bays, and a lean-to on the left. The windows are casements, and there are three gabled half-dormers with sash windows. Inside are timber framed cross walls.	II
Barn, Middle Spoad Farm; 52.43108°N 3.10276°W	—	Late 18th century (probable)	The barn is timber framed with weatherboarding on a limestone plinth, and has a corrugated iron roof. There are four bays, and it contains two doors and a loft door.	II
Newcastle Hall Farmhouse; 52.43423°N 3.10978°W	—	Late 18th century	The farmhouse, which was extended in the 19th century, is in limestone and has a hipped slate roof. There are two storeys and an L-shaped plan, consisting of a main range of five bays, and a later rear extension. In the centre is a gabled porch, the windows are sashes, and above the porch is a blind window.	II
Farmbuildings south-east of Newcastle Hall Farmhouse; 52.43401°N 3.10940°W	—	Late 18th century	A timber framed barn with weatherboarding on a limestone plinth, with limestone end walls and a roof of slate roof and corrugated asbestos.	II
Newcastle Mill; 52.43242°N 3.10661°W	—	Late 18th century	A watermill that was extended in the 19th century, it is in limestone and has a slate roof. The original part has two storeys and an attic, and the extension has two storeys. The mill contains doorways, a hoist door, windows, and a segmental-headed opening.	II
Gogin; 52.45033°N 3.12548°W		Late 18th or early 19th century (probable)	A limestone cottage with a corrugated iron roof, two storeys and three bays. Steps lead up to an upper floor doorway, the windows are casements, and there is a raking dormer.	II
Lake House Cottage; 52.43753°N 3.06974°W	—	Late 18th or early 19th century	A limestone cottage with a corrugated iron roof, one storey and an attic, two bays, and a lean-to on the left. The windows are casements.	II
Farm building north of Lake House; 52.43779°N 3.06899°W		Late 18th or early 19th century	The farm building is in a mixture of limestone and sandstone, and has a slate roof. There is one storey and an attic, and a T-shaped plan consisting of a main range and a rear wing. On the right gable end is a flight of steps leading up to a loft door. The windows are casements, and there are two gabled eaves dormers.	II
Middle Spoad Farmhouse; 52.43125°N 3.10268°W	—	Late 18th or early 19th century	The farmhouse is in limestone with a slate roof. There are two storeys, three bays, and a rear outshut. The windows are transomed casements, and above the central doorway is a rectangular three-part fanlight.	II
Garn Farmhouse; 52.43021°N 3.12557°W	—	Early 19th century	The farmhouse is in limestone, it is rendered at the sides and rear, and has a slate roof, hipped to the left. There are two storeys, three bays, and a single-storey extension to the left. Three semicircular steps lead up to a central doorway that has pilasters, a rectangular fanlight, a moulded cornice, and a triangular pediment, and the windows are sashes.	II
Cowhouse and stable north east of Lower Spoad; 52.43154°N 3.09394°W	—	Early 19th century	The farm building is in stone with a slate roof, and has two levels. There is a doorway in the ground floor and three loft doors above.	II
Bright memorial 52.43631°N 3.09982°W	—	Early to mid 19th century	The memorial is in the churchyard of St John's Church, and is to the memory of Ann Bright. It is a chest tomb in sandstone, and has a moulded plinth, sunken side panels with flanking fluted pilasters, shaped quarter corner balusters, and a moulded cornice.	II
Wellfield and outbuildings 52.43765°N 3.09776°W	—	c. 1840	The house is in limestone with a slate roof. It has two storeys, two parallel ranges, and a front of three bays. On the front is a porch with paired Greek Doric columns, a frieze, a cornice and a blocking course, and the windows are sashes. The outbuildings to the northwest consist of stables, a coach house, and a loft, and they have a ground floor in limestone, the upper floor is timber framed, and the roof is slated.	II
St John's Church; 52.43641°N 3.09983°W		1846–48	The church was designed by Edward Haycock. It is built in limestone with a slate roof, and consists of a nave, a south porch, a lower chancel, and a north vestry. At the west end is a gabled bellcote, and the windows are lancets.	II
Barn and Cowhouse adjoining 9 Whittcott Keysett; 52.43812°N 3.06919°W	—	Mid to late 19th century	The barn is timber framed with weatherboarding on a stone plinth, and has a slate roof. There is one storey and a loft, and probably three bays. The cowhouse or stable is to the right, the left part is in stone, the right part is timber framed with weatherboarding, and the roof is slated. It contains a window, doors, and a loft door.	II
Lych gate, St John's Church; 52.43653°N 3.09945°W		1880	The lych gate is at the entrance to the churchyard. It is constructed in timber on a low limestone plinth with flanking stone outshuts. There are decorative brackets supporting a half-hipped slate roof. The gablets have applied timber, and on the top is a wrought iron cross. The outshuts were formerly used as a hearse house and a shed.	II
