= Robert Clive (1789–1854) =

British politician

The Hon. Robert Clive DL JP

Member of Parliament for Shropshire South
- In office 1832–1854 Serving with The Earl of Darlington, Viscount Newport
- Preceded by: New constituency
- Succeeded by: Viscount Newport; Robert Windsor-Clive

Member of Parliament for Ludlow
- In office 1818–1832 Serving with Viscount Clive
- Preceded by: Viscount Clive; Henry Clive
- Succeeded by: Viscount Clive; Edward Romilly

Personal details
- Born: Robert Henry Clive; 15 January 1789 St George's, Hanover Square, London, England
- Died: 20 January 1854 (aged 65) Shrewsbury, England
- Party: Conservative
- Spouse: Lady Harriet Windsor (m. 1819)
- Relations: Edward Herbert, 2nd Earl of Powis (brother)
- Children: 6
- Parent(s): Edward Clive, 1st Earl of Powis; Lady Henrietta Herbert
- Education: St John's College, Cambridge

Hon. Robert Henry Clive (15 January 1789 – 20 January 1854) was a British Conservative Party politician.

== Early life ==
Clive was born in the parish of St George's, Hanover Square, London, a younger son of Edward Clive, 1st Earl of Powis. His mother was Lady Henrietta, daughter of Henry Herbert, 1st Earl of Powis. Edward Herbert (ne Clive), 2nd Earl of Powis, was his elder brother.

His paternal grandfather was Robert Clive, 1st Baron Clive ("Clive of India"), the first British Governor of the Bengal Presidency who is credited for laying the foundation of the British East India Company rule in Bengal.

He was educated at Eton College and was at St John's College, Cambridge from 1807 to 1809, when he graduated M.A. He was awarded an honorary LL.D. in 1835.

== Career ==
Clive sat as one of the two Members of Parliament for Ludlow from 1818 to 1832, alongside his brother, then known as Viscount Clive, and layer for Shropshire South from 1832 to 1854.

An agricultural landowner in Shropshire, Worcestershire, and Wales, he was an advocate of the abolition of the Corn Laws during Sir Robert Peel's administration. He was appointed to the commission investigating the Rebecca Riots in south Wales in October 1843. His home was Oakly Park at Bromfield, a house redesigned by his friend, Charles Robert Cockerell.

He was also a Deputy Lieutenant and Justice of the Peace for the county of Shropshire and a Justice of the Peace for Worcestershire.

In 1809, Clive was commissioned as a Captain into the South Shropshire Militia. He continued to serve after it became the South Shropshire Yeomanry Cavalry, commanding a troop at Bishop's Castle from 1817 to 1828. He was Colonel commanding the Worcestershire Yeomanry from 1833 until his death.

A keen antiquary, Clive was author of Documents Concerned with the History of Ludlow and the Lords Marchers (1841), and president of the Cambrian Archaeological Association in 1852.

Clive was deputy-chairman of two early railway companies in Shropshire, the Shrewsbury and Birmingham and the Shrewsbury and Hereford Railway. At a directors' meeting of the latter, on 30 December 1853, he was taken seriously ill and never recovered, dying a few weeks later.

== Personal life ==
Clive married Lady Harriet Windsor, daughter of Other Windsor, 5th Earl of Plymouth, in 1819. They had several children, including:

- Henrietta Sarah Windsor-Clive (1820–1899), a watercolourist who married Edward Hussey of Scotney Castle in 1853.
- Robert Windsor-Clive (1824–1859), also an MP for Ludlow and South Shropshire; he married Lady Mary Bridgeman, daughter of George Bridgeman, 2nd Earl of Bradford.
- Mary Windsor-Clive (c. 1829–1873), who died unmarried.
- George Windsor-Clive (1835–1918), MP for Ludlow; he married Gertrude Albertine, daughter of Charles Trefusis, 19th Baron Clinton.
- William Windsor Windsor-Clive (1837–1857), who died unmarried.
- Victoria Alexandrina Windsor-Clive (1839–1920), who married the Rev. Edward Farington Clayton, Rector of Ludlow in 1874.

After falling ill at a railway company directors' meeting, Clive died in Shrewsbury in January 1854, aged 65, at the nearby home of the Town Clerk. He was buried at Bromfield Parish Church, near his Oakly Park home near Ludlow.

The following year the barony of Windsor, which had fallen into abeyance on his brother-in-law's death in 1833, was called out of abeyance in favour of his widow, Harriett, who became the thirteenth Baroness Windsor in her own right. She died in November 1869, aged 72, and was succeeded in the barony by her grandson, Robert Windsor-Clive, who was created Earl of Plymouth in 1905.

== Sources ==
- Newman, John; Pevsner, Nikolaus (2006). Shropshire. Buildings of England. New Haven, US and London: Yale University Press. ISBN 978-0-300-12083-7. OCLC 70671576.

Parliament of the United Kingdom
Preceded by Viscount Clive; Henry Clive	Member of Parliament for Ludlow; 1818–1832; With: Viscount Clive	Succeeded by Viscount Clive; Edward Romilly
New constituency	Member of Parliament for Shropshire South; 1832–1854; With: The Earl of Darlington 1832–1842; Viscount Newport 1842–1854	Succeeded by Viscount Newport; Robert Windsor-Clive
