= Beriah Botfield =

British politician (1807–1863)

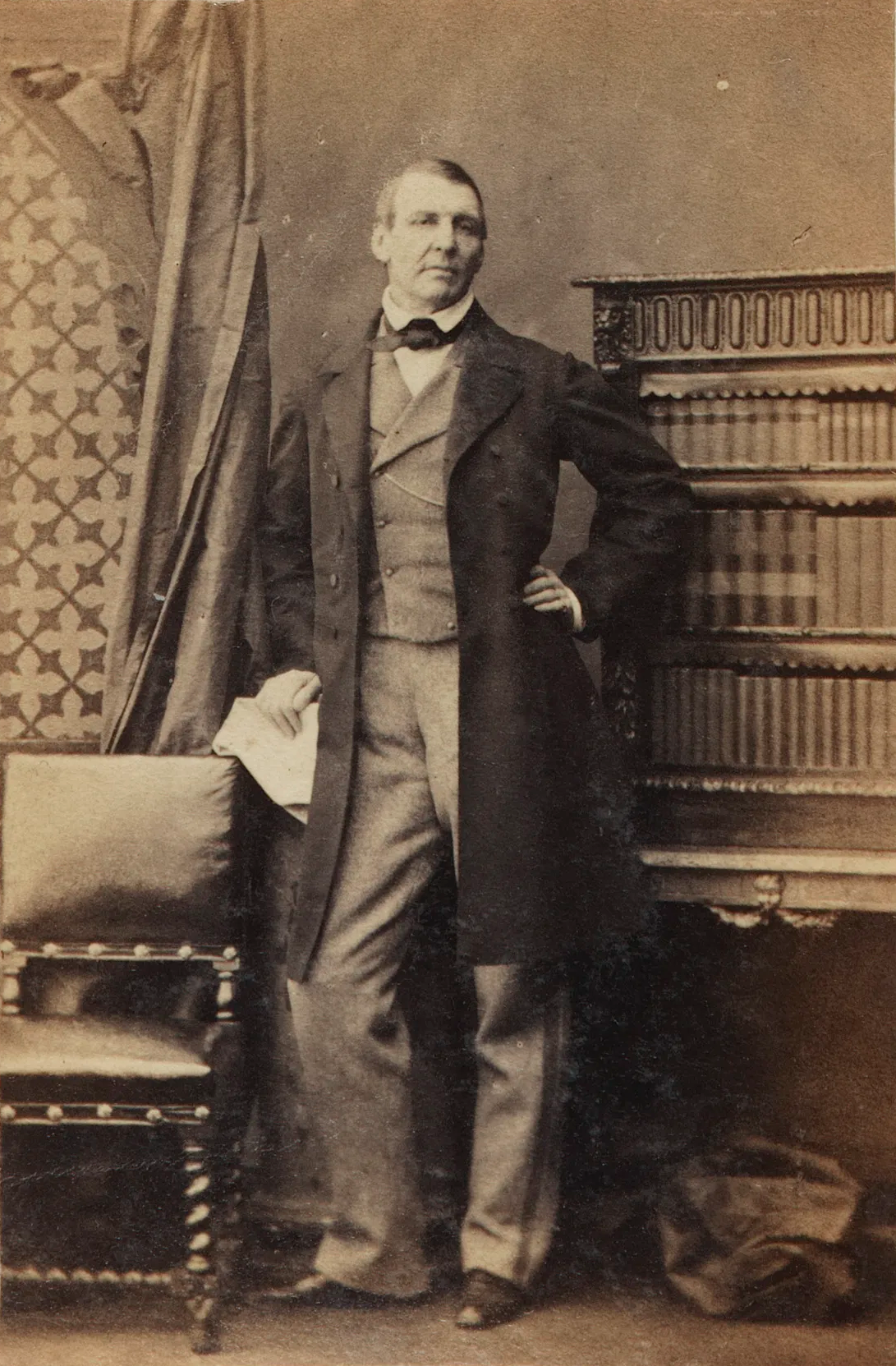
Portrait by Camille Silvy, 1861

Beriah Botfield FRS FRSE FSA FRGS (5 March 1807 – 7 August 1863) was a British Member of Parliament representing Ludlow in Shropshire as a Conservative. He was also a noted bibliographer, geologist and botanist.

== Life ==
He was born on 5 March 1807 in Earl's Ditton, Shropshire, the son of Beriah Botfield (brother of Thomas Botfield, F.R.S.) of Norton Hall, Northamptonshire, (died 1813) and Charlotte, daughter of William Withering. He was educated at Harrow School and then Christ Church, Oxford University, graduating BA in 1828.

He inherited the family's extensive coal mining and ironmaking business, which was based in Shropshire. Perhaps not so surprisingly, Beriah Botfield entered into political affairs.

In 1831 he became High Sheriff of Northamptonshire.

In 1840, Beriah was elected as a Member of Parliament for Ludlow in a by-election and held the seat until a defeat in the 1847 general election. He did manage to regain the position when he was re-elected in 1857, and continued to serve until his death in 1863. In 1858, he had erected a stone cross near the Wales–England border on Shadwell Hill, to commemorate a pedlar named William Cantlin who was robbed and murdered there in 1691.

Botfield was elected a Fellow of the Royal Society in January 1839. He was president of the British Archaeological Association. He was made a knight of the Order of Albert the Brave of Saxony for presenting a collection of British minerals to the royal collection at Dresden and a knight of the Order of Leopold (Belgium) after presenting a taxidermy collection of British birds to Brussels Natural History Museum.

He served as a Cornet in the South Shropshire Yeomanry Cavalry in 1845, and was treasurer of the Salop Infirmary in Shrewsbury in 1859.

Beriah Botfield died on 7 August 1863, at his home at Grosvenor Square, London, at the age of fifty-six.

In his will he left a considerable bequest to the Institution of Civil Engineers, and his collections of early printed and colour plate books and paintings, mainly Dutch landscapes to the Marquess of Bath, with whose family he claimed tenuous links. Most of the collections remained at Longleat.

== Works ==
Beriah was a well known bibliographer who set up a private printing press at his home in Norton Hall. Among the works which he printed there was an anonymous Journal of a Tour through the Highlands of Scotland (1830). Stemmata Botevilliana (1843) was printed for a private collection, then much enlarged and presented to the general public in 1858, as an account of the family of Boteville or Botfield. The issue of Bibliotheca Hearniana—excerpts from the Catalogue of the Library of Thomas Hearne (1848) was afterwards reprinted in the Reliquiæ Hearnianæ (1869 ed.).

== Family ==
On 21 October 1858, Beriah married Isabella Leighton in Alberbury, Shropshire. She was the second daughter of Sir Baldwin Leighton, the Seventh Baronet, who was also a Conservative party politician. They had no children.

Parliament of the United Kingdom
Preceded by Thomas Alcock; Henry Salwey	Member of Parliament for Ludlow; 1840–1847; With: Henry Salwey to 1841; James Ackers from 1841	Succeeded by Henry Bayley Clive; Henry Salwey
Preceded by Percy Egerton Herbert; Lord William Powlett	Member of Parliament for Ludlow; 1857–1863; With: Percy Egerton Herbert to 1860; George Windsor-Clive from 1860	Succeeded by Sir William Fraser; George Windsor-Clive
