= Henry Salwey =

British politician

Member of Parliament for Ludlow
- In office 31 July 1847 – 9 July 1852 Serving with Henry Bayley Clive
- Preceded by: Beriah Botfield; James Ackers
- Succeeded by: Robert Clive; Beriah Botfield
- In office 28 July 1837 – 3 July 1841 Serving with Beriah Botfield (1840–1841); Thomas Alcock (1839–1840); Edward Herbert (1837–1839)
- Preceded by: Edward Herbert; Edmund Charlton
- Succeeded by: Beriah Botfield; James Ackers

Personal details
- Born: 1794
- Died: 10 March 1874 (aged 79)
- Party: Whig

Henry Salwey (1794 – 10 March 1874) was a British Whig politician.

Salwey was first elected Whig MP for Ludlow in 1837, but lost the seat at the next general election in 1841. Although he regained the seat in 1841, he again lost the next general election in 1852.

Parliament of the United Kingdom
Preceded by Beriah Botfield; James Ackers	Member of Parliament for Ludlow; 1847–1852; With: Henry Bayley Clive	Succeeded by Robert Clive; Beriah Botfield
Preceded by Edward Herbert; Edmund Lechmere Charlton	Member of Parliament for Ludlow; 1837–1841; With: Beriah Botfield (1840–1841); Thomas Alcock (1839–1840); Edward Herbert (1837–1839)	Succeeded by Beriah Botfield; James Ackers
