= Percy F. Pollard =

British socialist activist

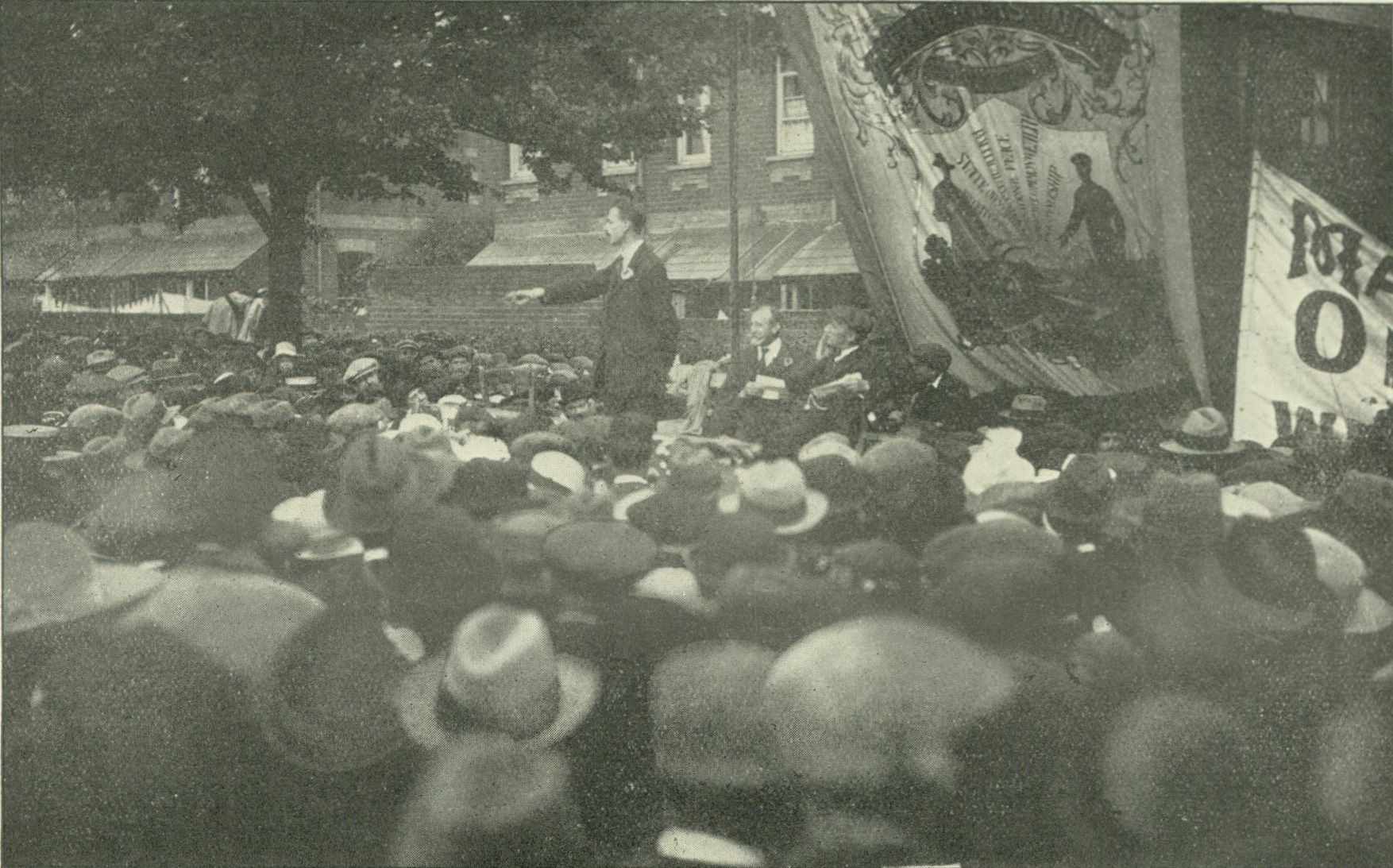
Pollard addressing a demonstration in Chelmsford, in 1919

Percy Frederick Pollard (born 1892) was a British socialist activist.

Born in Colchester in Essex, Pollard received an elementary education before starting work. He joined the Independent Labour Party (ILP), and in 1912 became the secretary of its East Anglian division. He also became active in the local labour movement, serving as the secretary of Colchester Trades Council from 1913 to 1914, and as its chair in 1919.

In 1919, Pollard began working as a full-time organiser for the Workers' Union. He became increasingly politically active, serving on the National Administrative Committee of the ILP from 1922, and in 1923 he became the full-time Labour Party organiser for Colchester. The ILP sponsored him as a Labour candidate in the 1923 Ludlow by-election, but he took only 7.8% of the vote in the election, and third place. Pollard remained an active trade unionist as a member of the Railway Clerks' Association, and he also spent a period as editor of the Colchester Times.

Pollard won election to Colchester Borough Council, but by 1931 he had moved to London to become the organising secretary of the Industrial Orthopaedic Society. He stood in Balham and Tooting at the 1931 United Kingdom general election, taking second place with 25.5% of the vote.

Party political offices
| Preceded by Herbert Witard | Eastern Division representative on the National Administrative Council of the Independent Labour Party; 1922–1926 | Succeeded by Dorothy Jewson |
