= Richard Langford (priest) =

Richard Langford was a Welsh Anglican priest in the late 17th and early 18th centuries.

Langford was born in Llanfwrog, Denbighshire and educated at St Alban Hall, Oxford. He held livings at Penmorfa, Bosbury, Llanrhaeadr-ym-Mochnant and Goodrich. Langford was appointed Archdeacon of Merioneth in 1716.
