= Charles Foxe =

English politician (died 1590)

Member of Parliament
- In office 1562–1563
- Preceded by: George Bromley
- Succeeded by: Thomas Eyton
- Constituency: Much Wenlock
- In office 1547 – March 1553
- Preceded by: Thomas Wheeler
- Succeeded by: John Passey
- Constituency: Ludlow
- In office 1539–1542
- Preceded by: William Foxe
- Succeeded by: John Bradshaw
- Constituency: Ludlow

Personal details
- Died: December 1590
- Spouse(s): Elizabeth Crosby; Catherine Leighton
- Children: 9

Charles Foxe (by 1516 – December 1590), of Bromfield, Shropshire and the Inner Temple, London, was an English politician.

== Family ==
Foxe was the second of six sons of Ludlow MP, William Foxe. His brother, Edmund Foxe, also represented the constituency. Foxe married Elizabeth Crosby, by whom he had two sons and three daughters. His second marriage was to Catherine Leighton, daughter of Sir Edward Leighton of Shropshire, with whom he had three sons. Foxe also had an illegitimate son by an unknown mother.

== Career ==
He was a Member (MP) of the Parliament of England for Ludlow in 1539, 1542, 1547 and March 1553, and for Much Wenlock in 1563.
