= George Windsor-Clive (politician, born 1835) =

British politician (1835-1918)

Lieutenant-Colonel George Windsor-Clive

Member of Parliament for Ludlow
- In office 1860–1885 Serving with Beriah Botfield (1860–63); Sir William Fraser (1863–65); John Edmund Severne (1865–68)
- Preceded by: Percy Egerton Herbert; Beriah Botfield
- Succeeded by: Jasper More

Personal details
- Born: 12 March 1835
- Died: 26 April 1918 (aged 83)
- Party: Conservative
- Spouse: Gertrude Albertine Trefusis (m. 1876; died 1878)
- Parents: Robert Henry Clive (father); Harriet Windsor (mother)
- Relatives: Edward Clive, 1st Earl of Powis (paternal grandfather); Robert Clive, 1st Baron Clive (great-grandfather); Robert Windsor-Clive (brother); Robert Windsor-Clive, 1st Earl of Plymouth (nephew); George Windsor-Clive (son)

Lieutenant-Colonel George Herbert Windsor Windsor-Clive (12 March 1835 – 26 April 1918) was a British Conservative Party politician.

Windsor-Clive was the younger son of Robert Henry Clive and a grandson of Edward Clive, 1st Earl of Powis, and the great-grandson of Robert Clive, 1st Baron Clive ("Clive of India"). His mother was Harriet Windsor, 13th Baroness Windsor, daughter of Other Hickman Windsor, 5th Earl of Plymouth, while Robert Windsor-Clive was his elder brother and Robert Windsor-Clive, 1st Earl of Plymouth, his nephew.

He was elected to the House of Commons as the Member of Parliament (MP) for Ludlow in a by-election in 1860, a seat he held until he retired from Parliament at the 1885 general election.

Windsor-Clive married Gertrude Albertine, daughter of Charles Rodolph Trefusis, 19th Baron Clinton, in 1876. She died in April 1878. Their son George succeeded his father as MP for Ludlow.

Windsor-Clive remained a widower until his death in April 1918, aged 83.

Parliament of the United Kingdom
Preceded by Percy Egerton Herbert; Beriah Botfield	Member of Parliament for Ludlow; 1860–1885; With: Beriah Botfield 1860–63; Sir William Fraser 1863–1865; John Edmund Severne 1865–68 (representation reduced to one member 1868)	Succeeded by Jasper More
