= Jasper More (Liberal politician) =

British politician

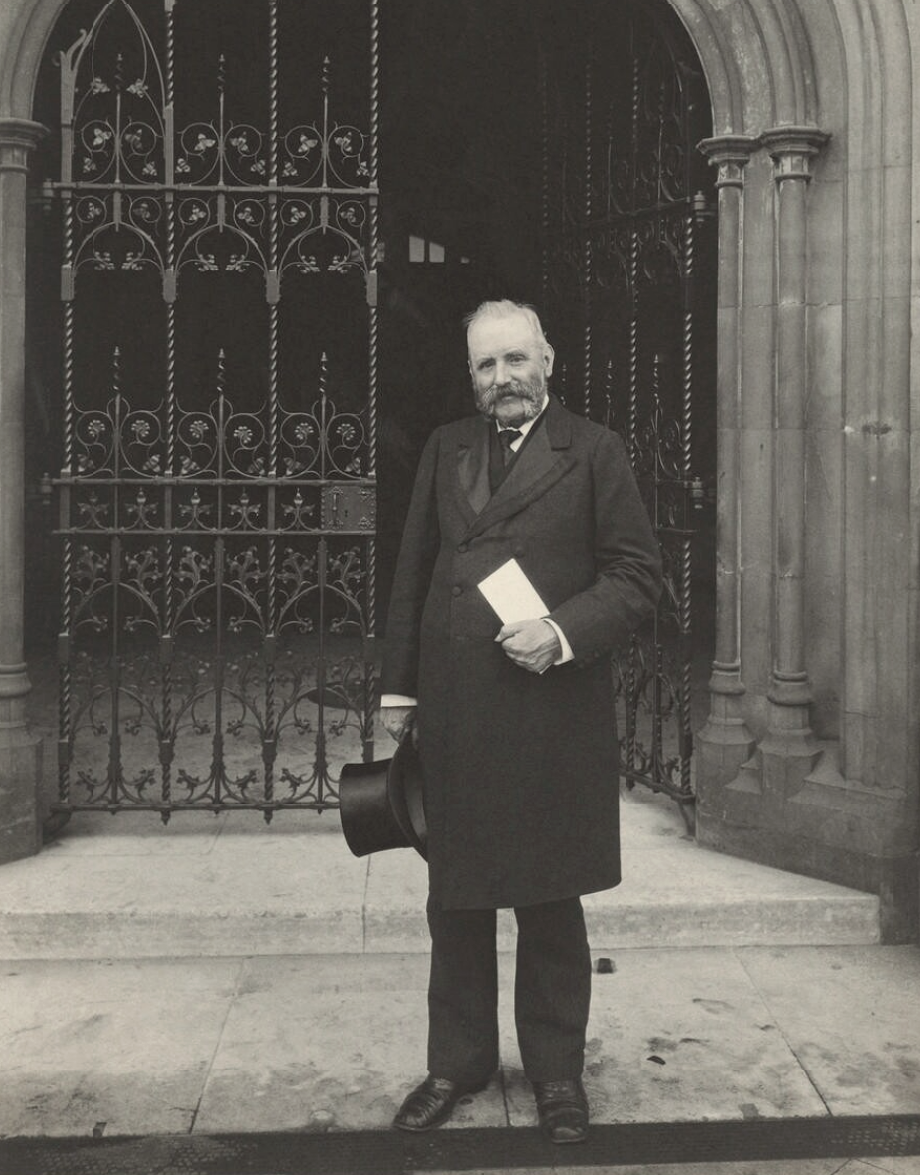
Jasper More, 1897 photograph

Robert Jasper More (30 October 1836 – 25 November 1903) was an English landowner, barrister and Liberal (later Liberal Unionist) politician who sat in the House of Commons in two periods between 1865 and 1903.

== Life ==
More was the son of the Rev. Thomas Frederick More, J.P., of Linley Hall, Shropshire, and his wife Harriet Mary More, daughter of Thomas More of Larden Hall, Much Wenlock. He was educated at Balliol College, Oxford, where he graduated as BA in 1860 and MA and BCL in 1862. He was called to the bar at Lincoln's Inn in 1863.

More was elected as Member of Parliament for Shropshire South in 1865 but lost the seat in 1868. In 1876 he made a tour of the Balkans after the April Uprising with Lady Strangford of which he subsequently published an account.

More was a J.P. and Deputy Lieutenant for Shropshire and High Sheriff of Shropshire in 1881. He was also a J.P. for Montgomeryshire.

More in 1895

In 1885, More stood at Ludlow and won the seat. In 1886 he joined the Liberal Unionist Party and retained his seat until his death in 1903 at the age of 67. In parliament he supported Lord Winchilsea's National Agricultural Union, opposed to the National Agricultural Labourers' Union.

== Lead mining ==
Mining was one of More's interests. His father, who died in 1869, was rector of Shelve, near Worthen in south-west Shropshire. The Foxhill lead mine at Shelve Hill was active in the 19th century, in an area where there had been Roman mines. The Rev. More leased mineral rights to the Gravels Lead Mining Co. and the Broomlow Mining Co. Thomas Wright in 1860 led a party from the British Association to Shelve Hill, which was entertained at Linley Hall by the Rev. More, Jasper and his sister.

Jasper More collected mineral specimens from the old lead mines of the area. In 1886, he exhibited these at the British Association meeting in Birmingham and then loaned and finally donated them to Mason College. The same year, an appeal was made to him on behalf of the Roman Gravels Mining Co. for a reduction on the royalties he took on lead mining, because pig lead had fallen in price.

== Family ==
More married in 1871 Evaline Frances Carr, daughter of the Rev. Edward Carr, Canon of Liverpool. They lived at Linley Hall, near Bishop's Castle in Shropshire. They had four sons:

- Thomas Jasper Mytton More (born 1872), married in 1904 Lady Norah Browne, daughter of Henry Browne, 5th Marquess of Sligo, father of Jasper More MP.
- Robert Henry More (born 1875), RAF Brigadier-General, married in 1919 Phyllis Blanche Parker, daughter of Francis Parker MP.
- Jasper Frederick More (born 1876), married in 1914 Rosamund Winifred Philips, daughter of Morton Philips of Weeping Cross.
- Richard Edwardes More (born 1879), married Ethel Alice Bodkin, daughter of John Bodkin of Kilcluny.

Parliament of the United Kingdom
Preceded by Baldwin Leighton; Percy Egerton Herbert	Member of Parliament for Shropshire South; 1865–1868; With: Percy Egerton Herbert	Succeeded by Edward Corbett and Percy Egerton Herbert
Preceded by George Windsor-Clive; John Edmund Severne	Member of Parliament for Ludlow; 1885–1903	Succeeded by Rowland Hunt
Honorary titles
Preceded by	High Sheriff of Shropshire; 1881	Succeeded by James Jenkinson Bibby
