= Richard Langford (MP for Ludlow) =

16th-century English politician

Richard Langford (died 1580), of Ludlow, Shropshire and Bristol, was an English merchant and politician.

== Family ==
He married Elizabeth née Rogers and they had three sons and three daughters.

== Career ==
He was a Member (MP) of the Parliament of England for Ludlow in 1563.
