= Edmund Foxe =

16th-century English politician

Edmund Foxe (by 1515 – 1550), of Ludford, Shropshire, was an English politician.

== Family ==
Foxe was the eldest son of the MP William Foxe, and brother of MP, Charles Foxe. Foxe was educated at Broadgates Hall, Oxford in 1531 and was admitted to Lincoln's Inn on 28 June 1536. In 1544 or 1545, he had married Catherine Trentham, a daughter of Ludlow MP Thomas Trentham of Shrewsbury who had previously been married to Thomas Hakluyt (who died in 1544). Foxe and his wife had one son and one daughter, and he remembered his stepchildren in his will. After his death, his wife Catherine married the MP, Nicholas Depden.

== Career ==
He was a Member (MP) of the Parliament of England for Ludlow in 1542.

Parliament of England
Preceded by Charles Foxe; Thomas Wheeler	Member of Parliament for Ludlow; 1542; With: Charles Foxe	Succeeded by Thomas Wheeler; John Bradshaw
