= William Gower =

English Member of Parliament

William Gower (born c. 1662), of Ludlow, Shropshire, was an English Member of Parliament for Ludlow in March 1690 – 22 December 1690, 1698 – 1 March 1699, and February–November 1701.
