= John Cother =

16th-century English politician

John Cother (born c. 1492, died c. 1532), of Ludlow, Shropshire, was an English politician.

He was the Member (MP) of the Parliament of England for Ludlow in 1523, 1529 and 1536, during the reign of Henry VIII of England.
