= George Windsor-Clive (politician, born 1878) =

British politician (1878–1968)

Lieutenant-Colonel George Windsor-Clive (6 April 1878 – 25 June 1968) was a Conservative Party politician elected as the Member of Parliament for Ludlow between 1923 and 1945.

== Personal ==
He was the son of Lt.-Col. Hon. George Herbert Windsor-Clive and Hon. Gertrude Albertina Trefusis.

Parliament of the United Kingdom
Preceded by The Viscount Windsor	Member of Parliament for Ludlow; 1923–1945	Succeeded by Uvedale Corbett
