= Baldwin Leighton =

Baldwin Leighton or Baldwyn Leighton may refer to:

- Sir Baldwin Leighton, 6th Baronet (1747–1828)
- Sir Baldwin Leighton, 7th Baronet (1805–1871), English landowner and politician, MP 1859–1865
- Sir Baldwyn Leighton, 8th Baronet (1836–1897), English landowner and politician, MP 1877–1885
