= 1904 Oswestry by-election =

British election

- 26 July 1904
- Registered: 10,075
- Turnout: 86.3% (▲6.8%)
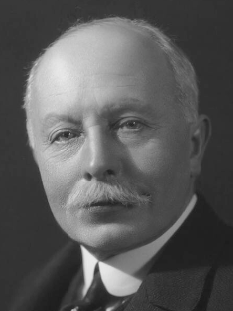
	First party	Second party
	Lib
Candidate	Allan Heywood Bright	William Bridgeman
Party	Liberal	Conservative
Popular vote	4,542	4,157
Percentage	52.2%	47.8%
Swing	▲9.0%	▼9.0%
MP before election
George Ormsby-Gore
Conservative
Subsequent MP
Allan Heywood Bright
Liberal

The 1904 Oswestry by-election was a Parliamentary by-election held on 26 July 1904. The constituency returned one Member of Parliament (MP) to the House of Commons of the United Kingdom, elected by the first past the post voting system.

== Vacancy ==
George Ormsby-Gore had been Conservative MP for the seat of Oswestry since the 1901 Oswestry by-election. On 26 June 1904 he succeeded his father as third Baron Harlech and entered the House of Lords.

== Electoral history ==
The seat had been Conservative since it was created in 1885. They easily held the seat at the last election, with an increased majority:

Oswestry by-election, 1901
Party	Candidate	Votes	%	±%
Conservative	George Ormsby-Gore	4,518	56.8	N/A
Liberal	Allan Heywood Bright	3,430	43.2	New
Majority		1,088	13.6	N/A
Turnout		7,948	79.5	N/A
Conservative hold		Swing	N/A	

== Candidates ==
The local Conservative Association selected 39-year-old William Bridgeman as their candidate to defend the seat. He was a prominent Municipal Reform Party member of the London County Council and had no link with the town's area, although his country home, Leigh Manor, Worthen, was then in the same constituency. He was assistant private secretary to Henry Holland, the Colonial Secretary (1889–1892), and then to Sir Michael Hicks-Beach, the Chancellor of the Exchequer from 1895 to 1897. In 1897 he became a member of the London School Board, and in 1904 he was elected to the London County Council.

The local Liberal Association selected 42-year-old Allan Heywood Bright as their candidate to gain the seat. He had been the Liberal candidate at the previous by-election in 1901. Previously he had contested Exeter in 1899 and 1900. He had a residence at Weston Rhyn near Oswestry. The Times noted that he had "nursed the constituency assiduously of late".

== Campaign ==
Polling Day was fixed for 26 July 1904, 30 days after the previous MP went to the House of Lords.

During the campaign, where tariff reform and free trade were topical issues, Winston Churchill, then M.P. for Oldham made eve-of-poll speeches at public meetings organised by the Free Trade Union in Ellesmere and Oswestry in support of Bright. He had crossed the floor of the Commons from the Conservative benches to the Liberals on 31 May, so was reportedly heckled with "turn-coat" taunts.

== Result ==
The count was conducted the following morning and the result declared at lunch-time. Crowds filled the Bailey Head in Oswestry – so much so that it was thought advisable to announce the result in private to prevent trouble. The Liberals gained the seat from the Conservatives:

1904 Oswestry by-election
Party	Candidate	Votes	%	±%
Liberal	Allan Heywood Bright	4,542	52.2	+9.0
Conservative	William Bridgeman	4,157	47.8	−9.0
Majority		385	4.4	N/A
Turnout		8,699	86.3	+6.8
Liberal gain from Conservative		Swing	+8.7	

The result was "a great surprise for both Conservatives and Liberals alike". Bright believed that the electorate had rejected the government, and that "the whole of Shropshire politics had been simply a policy of Tory bluff and the people seemed to have got tired of it".

== Aftermath ==
The same two candidates met again at the following general election, the result was:

General election January 1906
Party	Candidate	Votes	%	±%
Conservative	William Bridgeman	5,011	52.6	+4.8
Liberal	Allan Heywood Bright	4,508	47.4	−4.8
Majority		503	5.2	N/A
Turnout		9,519	90.7	+4.4
Conservative gain from Liberal		Swing	+4.8	

== See also ==
- 2021 North Shropshire by-election
