= John Share Jones =

British veterinary surgeon

Emeritus Professor John Share Jones
- Born: John Thomas Jones; 25 August 1873
- Died: 2 December 1950 (aged 77)
- Scientific career
- Fields: Veterinary anatomy, veterinary education
- Institutions: University of Liverpool

Prof. John Share Jones known as Dr Share Jones (25 August 1873 – 2 December 1950), was a British veterinary surgeon and briefly a Liberal Party politician.

== Personal life ==
Jones was born John Thomas Jones, in Cefn Mawr, Denbighshire, the son of Thomas Jones, a farmer, and his wife, Mary Ann. His mother's maiden name was Share, and Jones adopted this into his own name later in life.

Jones was educated at the University of Liverpool, King's College (proxime accessit Logic Prize), University College, the Royal Veterinary College, London (Centenary Prizeman, etc.) and Paris. He married Dr Mary Selina Jones (1874-1954) of Wrexham, who on 27 January 1920 was the first woman to be admitted to Gray's Inns. She held a legal degree from the University of Liverpool and later went on to qualify as a medical doctor. They lived at Pentre Bychan Hall near Wrexham, before later moving to live at Plas Kynaston Hall, Cefn Mawr. In 1948 he was awarded the MBE.

== Veterinary career ==
Jones graduated from the Royal Veterinary College, London in 1900, becoming a Member of the Royal College of Veterinary Surgeons. Jones joined the veterinary faculty at the University of Liverpool when it first opened in October 1914.

For the year 1928–29, Jones was President of the Royal College of Veterinary Surgeons. He retired from the University of Liverpool in 1939, whereupon the university bestowed on him the title of Emeritus Professor. Jones's unpublished biography is held at the university.

== Political career ==
Jones was Liberal candidate for the Oswestry division of Shropshire at the 1929 General Election. Oswestry was a safe Unionist seat where the Liberals usually finished second. He achieved a swing of 8.2%, but it was not enough to win the seat;

General Election 1929: Oswestry
Party	Candidate	Votes	%	±%
Unionist	Bertie Edward Parker Leighton	15,544	47.0	−8.1
Liberal	John Share Jones	10,565	32.0	+8.3
Labour	H S Evans	6,944	21.0	−0.2
Majority		4,989	15.0	−16.4
Turnout			78.8	−0.1
Unionist hold		Swing	-8.2	

He did not stand for parliament again. He was selected as a Liberal Party prospective parliamentary candidate for the neighbouring constituency of Shrewsbury sometime after 1935 and was active there in anticipation of a general election expected to take place in 1939/1940. As it transpired, due to the outbreak of World War II, the election did not take place until 1945, by which time he had been replaced as Liberal candidate.

== Publications ==
- "A case of supernumerary digit in the ox". Journal of Comparative Pathology and Therapeutics. 15: 143–146. January 1902. doi:10.1016/S0368-1742(02)80019-4.
- Surgical Veterinary Anatomy, in 4 volumes 1904–1914:
  - Share-Jones, John T. The surgical anatomy of the horse. Part III. London: Balliere, Tindall and Cox – via Wellcome Collection.
- Superficial Anatomy of the Limbs, 1906
- Comparative anatomy of supernumerary digits in certain ungulates as evidence of the inter-relationship existing between the various species
  - "First article". The Veterinary Journal. 67 (3): 145–157. March 1911. doi:10.1016/S0372-5545(17)66855-X.
  - "Second article". The Veterinary Journal. 67 (6): 344–355. June 1911. doi:10.1016/S0372-5545(17)66703-8.
  - "Third article". The Veterinary Journal. 69 (5): 212–224. May 1913. doi:10.1016/S0372-5545(17)65530-5.
- "Points in the Anatomy of the Fore Limb of the Llama as Compared with Capra and Equus". The Veterinary Journal. 69 (7): 310–321. July 1913. doi:10.1016/S0372-5545(17)65428-2.
- Higher Agricultural Education in Wales, 1914
- The Education of the Veterinary Student, Brussels, 1919
- Local Health Authorities and Animal Diseases, Bordeaux, 1924
- Veterinary Science, 1910–1925
- The Encyclopædia Britannica
- Animal Husbandry and Public Health, with a plea for a National System of Live Stock Insurance, Ghent, 1927
- The Relationship of the Veterinary Surgeon to Animal Husbandry, International Veterinary Congress, 1930
- The Domestic Animals in relation to our Food and Industries, 1935
- Settlement on the Land—Der Ausweg, Paris
- Wales and the Animal Industry
- formerly Editor Veterinary Student and Editor-in-chief Veterinary News
