= Sweeney Hall, Shropshire =

House in Oswestry, Shropshire, England

Coordinates: 52°49′55″N 3°03′02″W

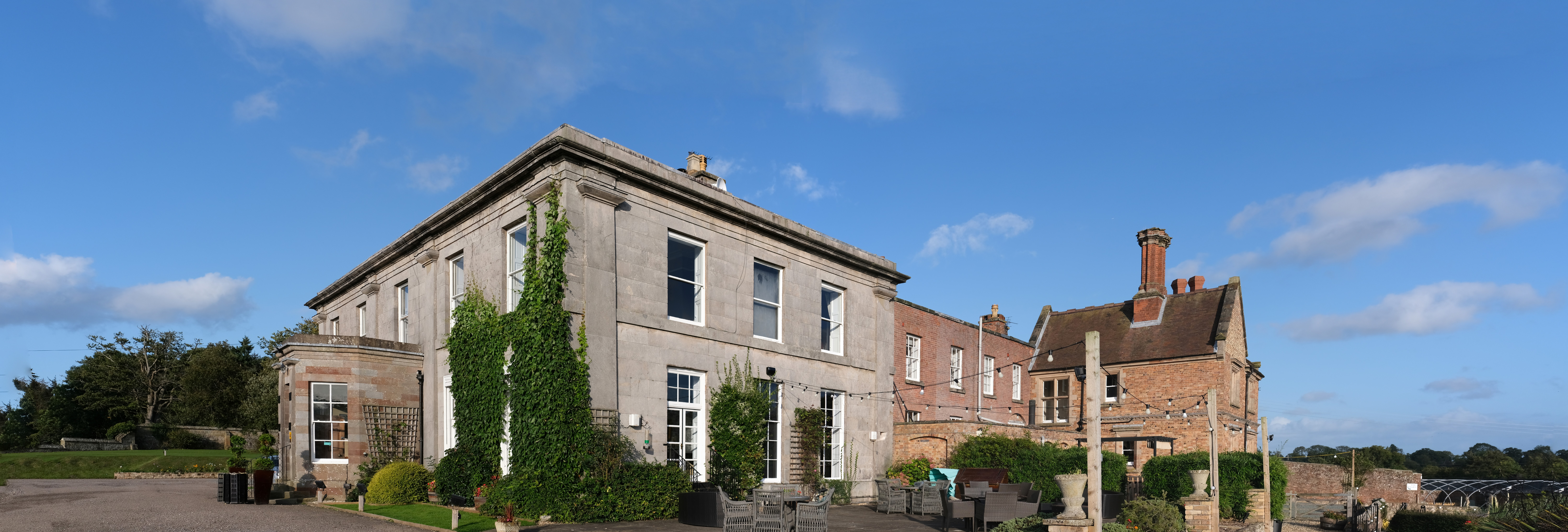
Sweeney Hall

Sweeney Hall in Oswestry, Shropshire, is a building that is grade II listed on the English Heritage Register. It was built in 1805 by Thomas Netherton Parker on the site of a 17th-century residence. It was the home of many notable residents over the next two centuries and is today a hotel and wedding venue.

== History ==
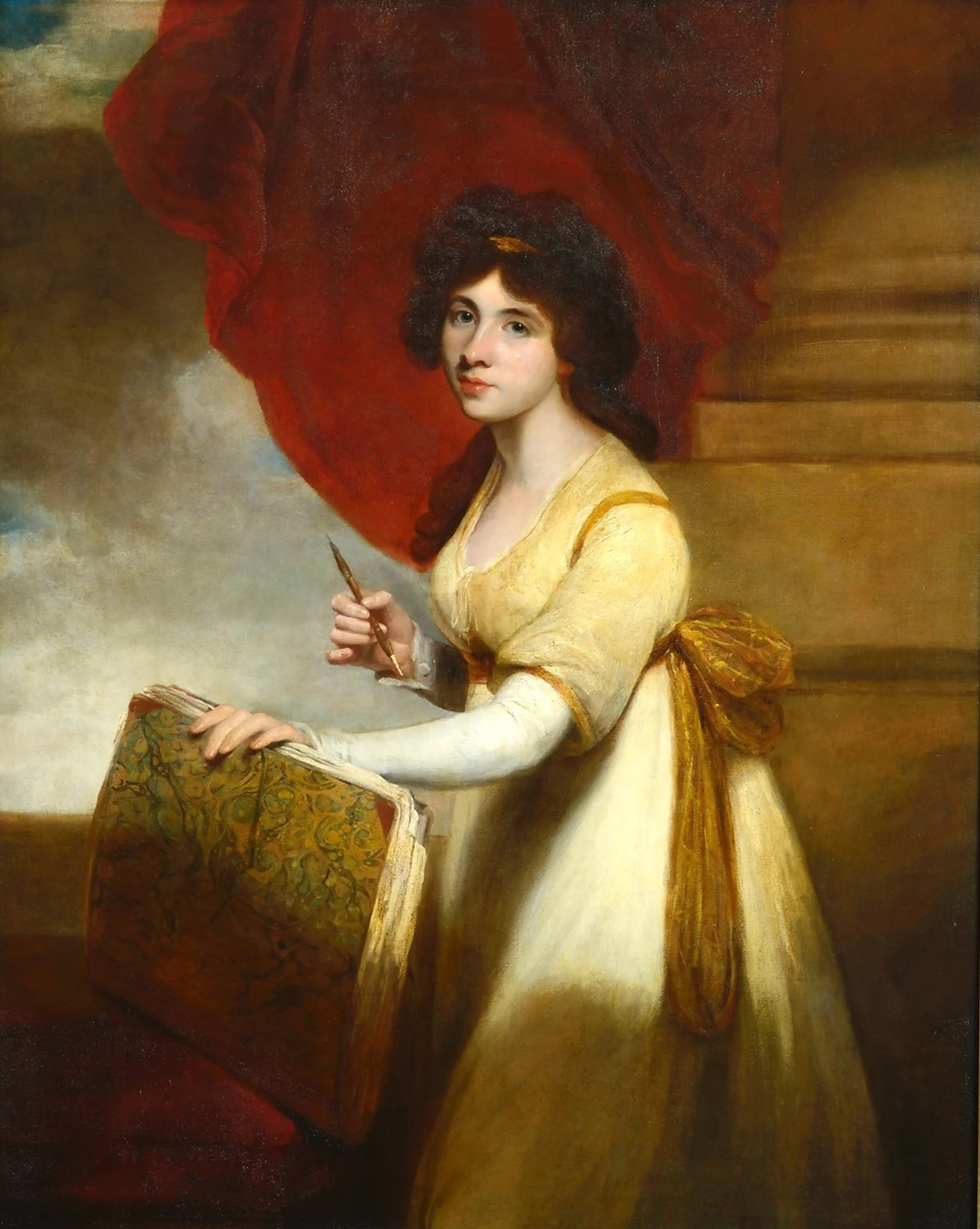
Sarah Parker 1796 at the time of her wedding

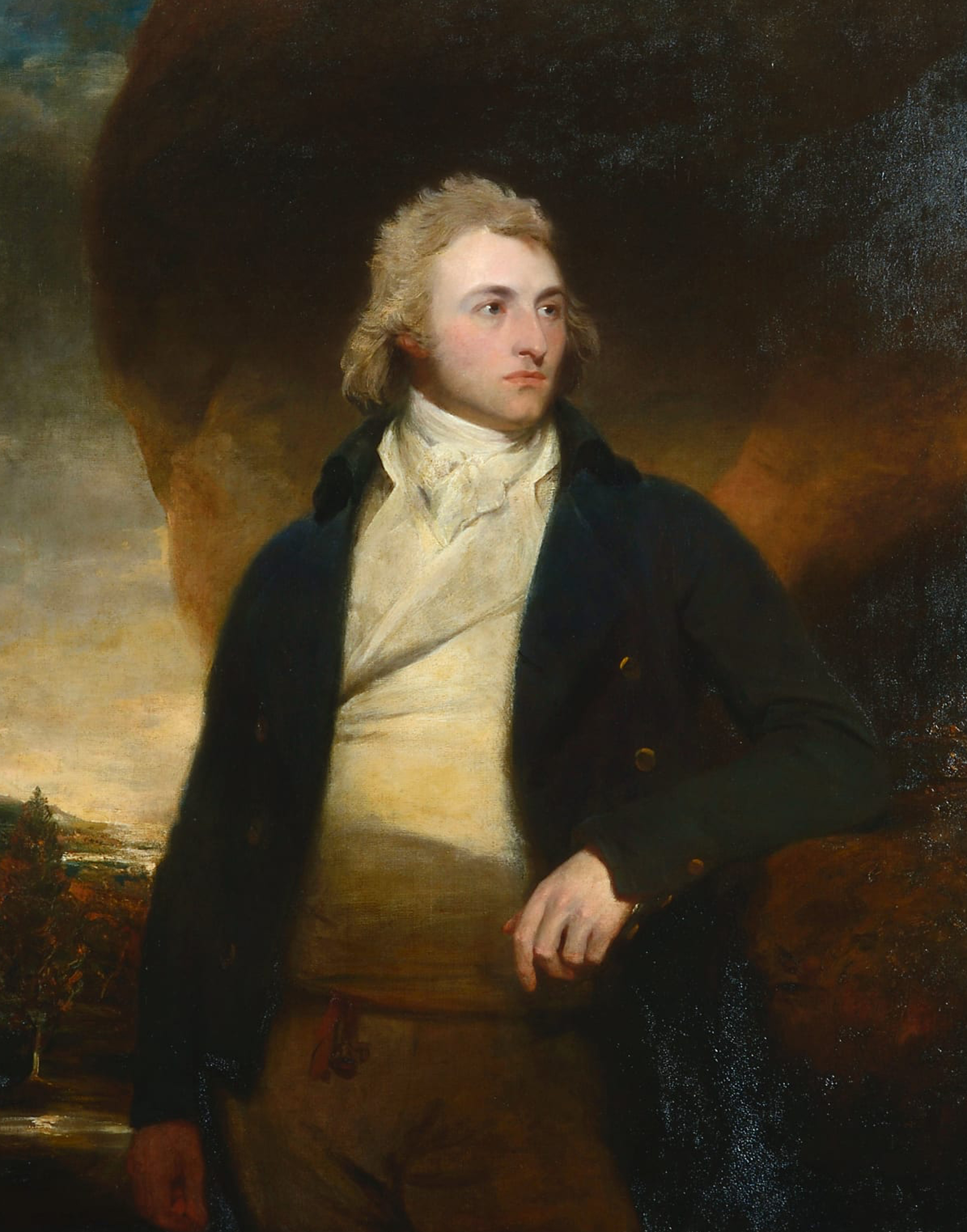
Thomas Netherton Parker 1796 at the time of his wedding

Thomas Netherton Parker and his wife Sarah Browne built the present Sweeney Hall. Thomas was the son of John Parker, a silversmith in the firm Parker and Wakelin. He owned the White House (Longdon Hall) in Longdon, Worcestershire and when he died in 1796 Thomas who was his only child inherited the property. Sarah was a descendant of Thomas Baker who built the first Sweeney residence in 1640. His grave and several others are still maintained in the grounds of the present Hall. Sarah inherited this property in 1783 when her uncle died. She brought it with her to the Parker family when she married Thomas.

Thomas and Sarah were married in 1796 and to commemorate they commissioned the famous artist Sir Martin Archer Shee to paint their portraits. These are shown. While he lived at Sweeney Hall Thomas made many inventions to improve agriculture which he published. When he died in 1848 his son the Reverend John Parker became the owner of the Hall.

Reverend John Parker was the Vicar of Llanyblodwell and therefore did not live at the Hall. His mother Sarah continued to reside there. The 1851 Census records her there with a housekeeper, two housemaids, a butler and a pageboy. She died in 1854 and the house was rented for several years. John did not marry so when he died in 1860 the house was inherited by his sister Mary.

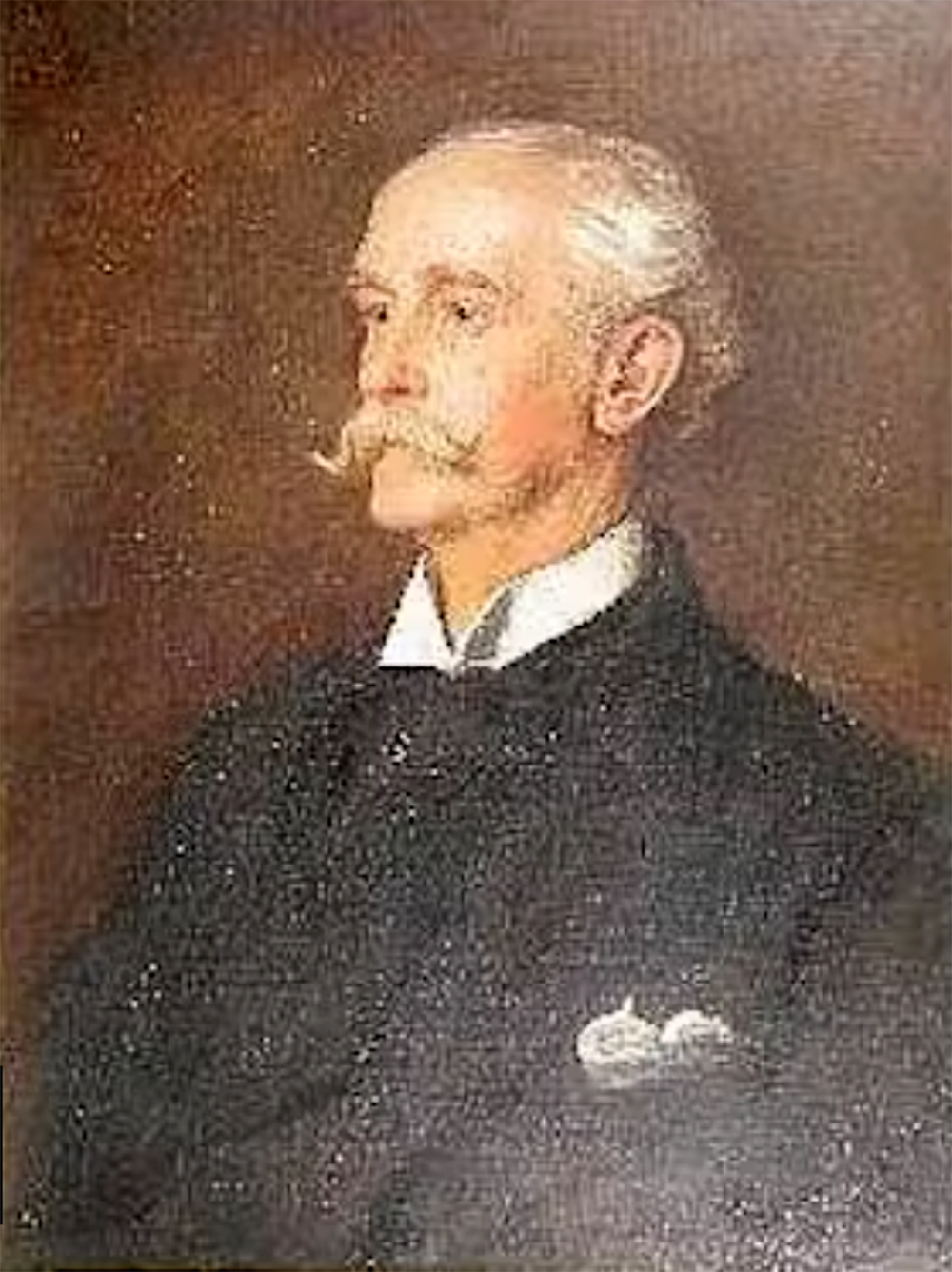
Stanley Leighton portrait by Sir John Everett Millais

Mary Parker married in 1832 Sir Baldwin Leighton, 7th Baronet and the Hall was passed into the Leighton family. In 1869 it was gifted to their second eldest son Stanley Leighton.

Stanley Leighton was a barrister, landowner, artist and Conservative politician. He was also known as an antiquarian was a vice- president of the Shropshire Archæological Society from its foundation. In 1873 he married Jessie Marie Williams-Wynn daughter and co-heiress of Henry Bertie Watkin Williams Wynn of Montgomeryshire. In 1896 the famous painter Sir John Everett Millais painted his portrait which is shown. When he died in 1901 his son Bertie Edward Parker Leighton became the owner of the Hall.

Bertie Edward Parker Leighton was a British Army Officer and Conservative politician. In 1936 at the age of 61 he married Margaret Evelyn Hanmer who was the daughter of the Reverend Hugh Hanmer of The Mount in Oswestry. The couple had no children. When he died in 1952 Margaret continued to live at the Hall until 1969 when she sold it and it was converted to a hotel.

== Burial ground ==
The old burial ground of the Nonconformists is still maintained at Sweeney Hall. The graves include "Thomas Baker Esq. Deceased March 9th, aged 68, AD 1675". Another grave reads "here lies Mrs Abigail Chetwood, daughter of Sir Richard Chetwood, who died 1 May 1658." She was born in 1604 in Odell, Bedfordshire. She did not marry and her will of 1658 which says she lives in Sweeney leaves her money mostly to her numerous friends and relatives.

There is also a grave of Jane Mostyn with the inscription "Jane ye wife of Ambrose Mostyn deceased July 26 1651." Her death is recorded as being at Sweeney, Oswestry in the Genealogy of Shropshire: Microfilm of original records. Ambrose Mostyn was the Minister of the Independent Church in Wrexham.
