= Leighton baronets =

Extinct baronetcy in the Baronetage of the United Kingdom

There have been two baronetcies created for persons with the surname Leighton, one in the Baronetage of England and one in the Baronetage of the United Kingdom. One creation is extant as of 2010.

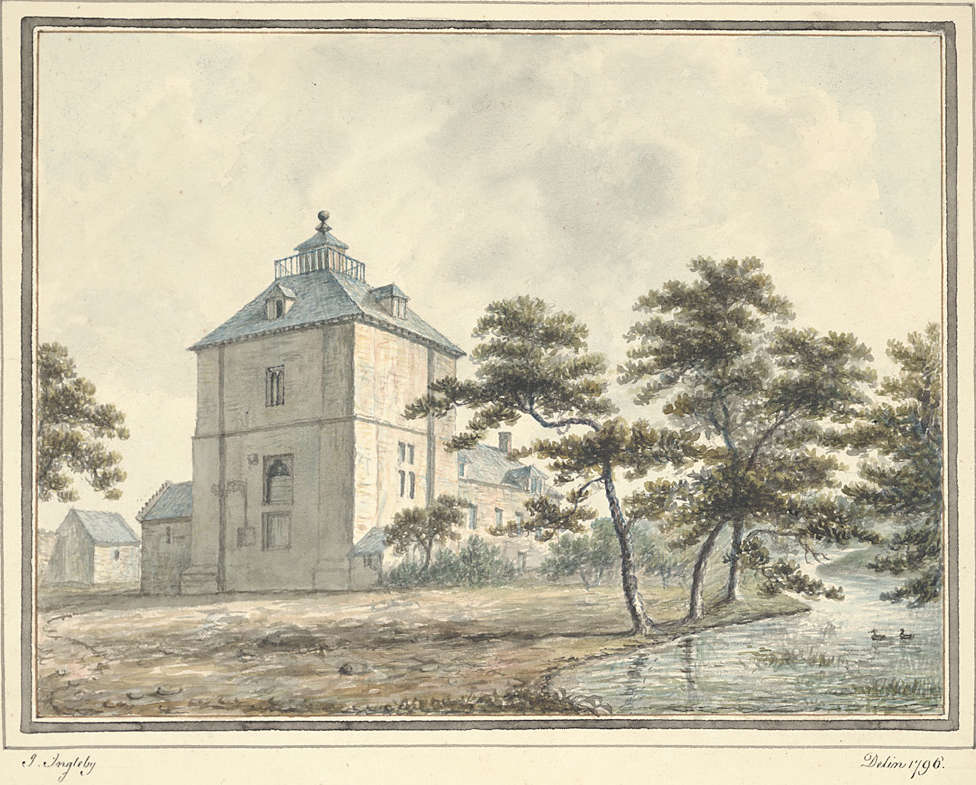
Wattlesborough Tower

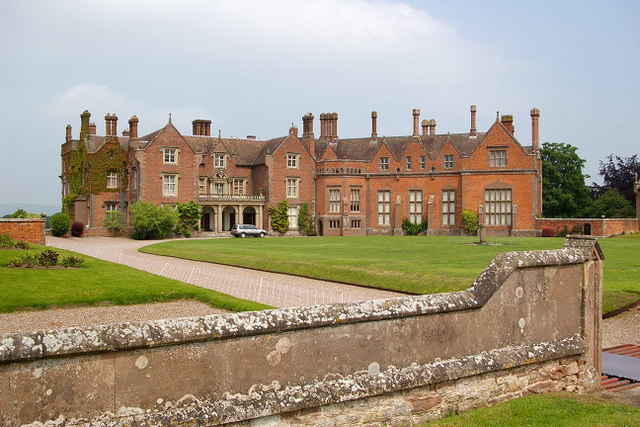
Loton Park

The Leighton Baronetcy, of Wattlesborough in the County of Shropshire, was created in the Baronetage of England on 2 March 1693 for Edward Leighton, subsequently member of parliament for Shropshire and Shrewsbury. The Leighton family took their name from the village of Leighton in Shropshire, where they were settled in the 12th century. Richard de Leighton represented Shropshire in the House of Commons from 1312 to 1318 and many later members of the family served as Knights of the Shire for the county. The first and fourth Baronets both sat as Members of Parliament for Shrewsbury. The 6th baronet was injured in the American War of Independence. The seventh Baronet was High Sheriff of Shropshire in 1835 and both he and the eighth Baronet represented Shropshire South in Parliament. The tenth Baronet was a Lieutenant-Colonel in the Shropshire Yeomanry and served as high sheriff of Shropshire in 1956.

The Wattlesborough and Loton Park estates came into the family through marriage in the reign of Edward IV of England. The second Baronet made Loton Park the main family seat and greatly enlarged the house in 1712. It remains the ancestral seat of the family.

The Leighton Baronetcy was created in the Baronetage of the United Kingdom on 11 February 1886. For more information on this creation, see Baron Leighton.

== Leighton baronets, of Wattlesborough (1693) ==
Escutcheon of the Leighton baronets of Wattlesborough

- Sir Edward Leighton, 1st Baronet (c. 1650–1711)
- Sir Edward Leighton, 2nd Baronet (1681–1756)
- Sir Charlton Leighton, 3rd Baronet (c. 1715–1780)
- Sir Charlton Leighton, 4th Baronet (1747–1784)
- Sir Robert Leighton, 5th Baronet (1752–1819)
- Sir Baldwin Leighton, 6th Baronet (1747–1828)
- Sir Baldwin Leighton, 7th Baronet (1805–1871)
- Sir Baldwyn Leighton, 8th Baronet (1836–1897)
- Sir Bryan Baldwin Mawddwy Leighton, 9th Baronet (1868–1919)
- Sir Richard Tihel Leighton, 10th Baronet (1893–1957)
- Sir Michael John Bryan Leighton, 11th Baronet (born 1935)

There is no heir to the title.

== Leighton baronets, of St Mary Abbots (1886) ==
- see the Baron Leighton
