= 1901 Oswestry by-election =

UK Parliamentary by-election

The 1901 Oswestry by-election was held on 24 May 1901 following the death of the incumbent Conservative MP, Stanley Leighton on 4 May 1901.

The seat was retained by the Conservative candidate George Ormsby-Gore.

1901 Oswestry by-election
| Party | Candidate | Votes | % | ±% |
|---|---|---|---|---|
| Conservative | Hon. George Ormsby-Gore | 4,518 | 56.8 | N/A |
| Liberal | Allan Heywood Bright | 3,430 | 43.2 | New |
| Majority | | 1,088 | 13.6 | N/A |
| Turnout | | 7,948 | 79.5 | N/A |
| Conservative hold | | | | |
