= Oliver Poole, 1st Baron Poole =

British Conservative politician, soldier and businessman

The Right Honourable The Lord Poole CBE TD PC

Member of Parliament for Oswestry
- In office 5 July 1945 – 3 February 1950
- Preceded by: Bertie Leighton
- Succeeded by: David Ormsby-Gore

Member of the House of Lords Lord Temporal
- In office 11 July 1958 – 28 January 1993
- Preceded by: Peerage created
- Succeeded by: The 2nd Baron Poole

Personal details
- Born: 8 November 1911 St Marylebone, London
- Died: 28 January 1993 (aged 81) Kensington, London
- Party: Conservative
- Spouse(s): Betty Margaret Gilkison; Daphne Wilma Kenyon Bowles; Barbara Ann Taylor
- Education: Christ Church, Oxford
- Awards: Commander of the Order of the British Empire; Officer of the Order of the British Empire; Member of the Order of the British Empire; Territorial Decoration; Mentioned in Despatches (3); Legion of Merit (United States); Knight Grand Officer of the Order of Orange Nassau (Netherlands)

Military service
- Allegiance: United Kingdom
- Branch/service: British Army
- Years of service: 1934–1946
- Rank: Colonel
- Unit: Warwickshire Yeomanry
- Battles/wars: World War II: Syria–Lebanon campaign; Iraq campaign; North African campaign; Italian campaign; North-West Europe Campaign of 1944–45

Oliver Brian Sanderson Poole, 1st Baron Poole CBE TD PC (11 August 1911 – 28 January 1993), was a British Conservative Party politician, soldier and businessman.

== Early life ==
Oliver Brian Sanderson Poole was born at 6 Montagu Mansions, St Marylebone, London, on 11 August 1911, the only child of Donald Louis Poole, an insurance broker and a member of Lloyd's of London, and his wife Therese Lillian née Frodsham. He was educated at Eton and Christ Church, Oxford, where he played polo for the university. He graduated in 1932 as a Bachelor of Arts (B.A.).

== Military service ==
Poole served in the Life Guards for nine months, and was commissioned as an officer in the Warwickshire Yeomanry in 1934. During the Second World War, he fought in Syria, Iraq, North Africa, Italy and North-West Europe, rising to become a colonel in the British Army on the staff of the 21st Army Group. He was thrice mentioned in despatches. He was appointed to the Order of the British Empire as a Member (military) on 18 February 1943, and was promoted to be an Officer (military) on 16 September that year, and Commander (military) on 11 October 1945. He was also appointed to the American Legion of Merit as a Legionnaire "in recognition of distinguished services in the cause of the Allies" on 15 March 1945, and to the Dutch Order of Orange-Nassau with Swords (denoting the military division) as a Commander on 16 January 1947.

== Political career ==
Poole was elected Member of Parliament for Oswestry in the 1945 general election, but stood down at the 1950 general election. He was later Joint Honorary Treasurer of the Conservative Party from 1952 to 1955, its Chairman from 1955 to 1957, its deputy chairman from 1957 to 1959, its joint chairman with Iain Macleod in 1963 and its vice-chairman from 1963 to 1964. In the 1958 Birthday Honours, he was raised to the peerage, and was gazetted on 11 July as Baron Poole, of Aldgate in the City of London. In the 1963 Birthday Honours, he was sworn of the Privy Council.

== Business career ==
In 1933, Poole joined a firm of building contractors in Birmingham. He joined the family business, John Poole & Son Ltd, insurance brokers, in the city, in 1939, and became a member of Lloyd's. In 1950, he joined S. Pearson & Sons Ltd on the invitation of his friend Weetman Pearson, 3rd Viscount Cowdray, and became its chief executive. He oversaw the expansion of the company through the acquisition of the Financial Times, Penguin Books, Longman, Château Latour, and Royal Doulton. From 1950 to 1965, he was a director of Lazard Brothers & Co, a London merchant bank in which Pearsons owned 80 per cent of the stock, and was its chairman from 1965 to 1973. He also became a member of the board of Fiat, in Turin, in 1972, and a trustee of the National Gallery in 1973.

== Family ==
Poole married Betty Margaret, daughter of Captain Dugald Stewart Gilkison, on 6 September 1933. They had one son and three daughters: Caroline, Alison Victoria, Sheila Marian and David Charles. They divorced in 1951. He married Daphne Wilma Kenyon Bowles, daughter of Eustace Bowles and formerly wife of Brigadier Algernon Heber-Percy, on 9 May 1952. They had no children and were divorced in 1965. He married Barbara Ann Taylor, the only daughter of E. A. Taylor, on 4 April 1966. They had no children.

Poole began using a wheelchair after he suffered a stroke in 1974. He spent summers at his villa in Castellina in Chianti, in Tuscany. He died from bronchopneumonia at his home at 24 Campden Hill Gate in Kensington, London, on 28 January 1993. He was survived by his third wife (who died in 2022) and his four children from his first marriage, and was succeeded in the barony by his son David.

== Arms ==
Coat of arms of Oliver Poole, 1st Baron Poole
Crest A lion's gamb erased or, enfiled by a crown composed of four trident heads set upon a rim azure. Escutcheon Per saltire or, and barry undy argent and azure, in chief and in base a portcullis chained also azure. Supporters On either side a crane proper about the neck a purse azure garnished gold Motto Strive for the right.

Parliament of the United Kingdom
Preceded by Bertie Leighton	Member of Parliament for Oswestry; 1945–1950	Succeeded by David Ormsby-Gore
Peerage of the United Kingdom
New creation	Baron Poole; 1958–1993	Succeeded by David Charles Poole
