= Pentre Bychan =

Hamlet in Wrexham County Borough, Wales

Coordinates: 53.022°N 3.035°W

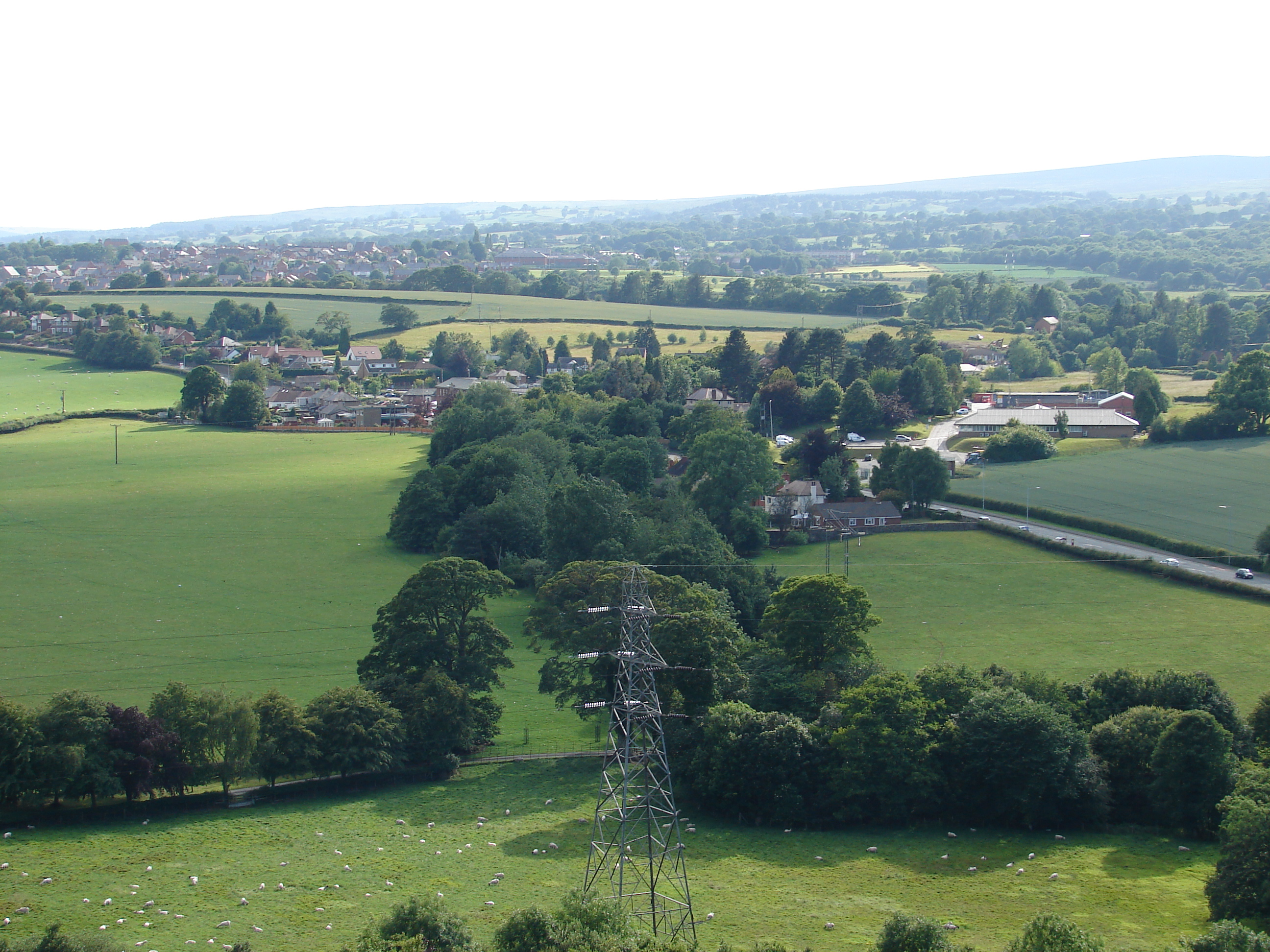
- Pentre Bychan

- Location within Wrexham
- OS grid reference: SJ306477
- Community: Esclusham
- Principal area: Wrexham
- Preserved county: Clwyd
- Country: Wales
- Sovereign state: United Kingdom
- Post town: WREXHAM
- Postcode district: LL14
- Dialling code: 01978
- Police: North Wales
- Fire: North Wales
- Ambulance: Welsh
- UK Parliament: Clwyd South
- Senedd Cymru – Welsh Parliament: Clwyd South

Pentre Bychan (Welsh for 'little village') is a semi-rural hamlet in Wrexham County Borough, Wales.

Variously spelled as either one word or two (Pentre Bychan or Pentrebychan), it is situated between Rhostyllen and Johnstown in the ward and community of Esclusham, some 4 km south-west of Wrexham city centre.

== History ==
The ancient monument Offa's Dyke runs through Pentre Bychan.

The Pentrebychan estate was once of great importance in the area. The 16th-century house originally belonged to the Tegin family. It was a single-storey building, half-timbered with wattle and daub.

In 1620 the estate was purchased by Hugh Meredith. The Meredith family, who owned several local coal mines, occupied the estate until 1802 when Thomas Meredith, the last of the male line, died. The family traced their ancestry to Bleddyn ap Cynfyn, Prince of Powys. The Hall and estate were described as among the most extensive in the area. Many of the Welsh place names on the estate in the days of the early Merediths are extant today.

The estate passed into the Warter family. Joseph Warter (died 1811) married Margaretta Elizabeth Meredith, daughter and heiress of Thomas Meredith. His son Henry Warter succeeded to the estate, took the additional surname Meredith, and served as High Sheriff of Denbighshire in 1844.

In 1823 the hall was replaced with a larger, three storey, dressed-stone building with gables, which had a stable block and coachhouse at the rear. The hall was surrounded by landscaped gardens which included a brick dovecote which dated back to 1721, a "fine example of an eighteenth century dovecote", Grade II listed since 1977.

The notable Arts & Crafts architect Frank Shayler designed a pair of houses of rustic brick beneath sand-faced clay tiles in the grounds of the former Pentrebychan Hall in 1936, developed speculatively. Originally intended to be a group of twelve, initial sales were slow due to being marketed at a relatively high value. As a consequence, only two were built with construction subsequently halted by the Second World War.

The hall was used to house refugees during the war. It was purchased in 1948 by Denbighshire County Council, who at the time administered the area, but was demolished in 1963.

The Wrexham crematorium was built on the site, on Pentre Bychan Road, off Smithy Lane, and opened in 1966. The house's magnificent gardens and woods remain, together with the dovecote; they are in the crematorium's 40 acre (16 ha) grounds and are maintained as semi natural woodland (including three pools and Pentrebychan brook).

Animal species located in the grounds include heron, badgers, buzzards, snakes, ducks and owls. The grounds also consist of one ungrazed paddock which is kept as a wild meadow and an arboretum. A section of Offa's Dyke passes through the crematorium grounds.

== Local businesses ==
Hafren Dyfrdwy, (previously Wrexham and East Denbighshire Water Company, Wrexham Water and Dee Valley Water) and Scottish Power are prominent businesses located on the Wrexham Road at Packsaddle Bridge.

== Notable residents ==
- John Share Jones MBE, veterinary surgeon and Liberal Party candidate, lived at Pentrebychan Hall.
- Susan Elan Jones, Labour MP for Clwyd South between 2010 and 2019, lives on the outskirts of the village.
- Llŷr Williams, classical pianist, was raised in Pentre Bychan, where his parents still live.

== Countryside Walk ==
Pentre Bychan can be visited as part of one of Wrexham County Council's Countryside Walks.
