= 1876 South Shropshire by-election =

UK Parliamentary by-election

The 1876 South Shropshire by-election was fought on 3 November 1876. The by-election was fought due to the death of the incumbent Conservative MP, Percy Egerton Herbert. It was won by the unopposed Conservative candidate John Edmund Severne.
