= Edward Corbett (politician) =

British land-owner and Conservative Party politician

Colonel Edward Corbett (30 December 1817 – 6 January 1895) was a British land-owner and Conservative Party politician from an old Norman family in Shropshire. He held a seat in the House of Commons from 1868 to 1877.

== Early life ==
Corbett was the oldest surviving son of Panton Corbett of Longnor Hall in Shropshire and Leighton Hall in Montgomeryshire. His mother was Louisa Favoretta Jones, from Lichfield in Staffordshire, and his father had been the member of parliament (MP) for Shrewsbury from 1820 to 1830.

Corbett was educated at Eton. He joined the British Army in November 1837 as an ensign in the 51st regiment, and was promoted to the rank of Lieutenant. He switched to the 72nd Highlanders in 1841, and retired from the army in October 1844. By 1874 he was living in Longnor Hall and held the rank of lieutenant-colonel in the Shropshire militia, and the honorary rank of colonel (which was bestowed in 1883). He resigned his commission in the militia in October 1884, but was permitted to retain his rank.

== Political career ==
By 1868 Corbett was a justice of the peace (J.P.) for Shropshire, and a deputy lieutenant of Shropshire.

He was elected at the 1868 general election as an MP for South Shropshire, having expressed confidence in Disraeli and promised voters "to resist to the utmost of his power Mr. Gladstone's attempt to uproot and destroy the Protestant Church". Corbett was re-elected in 1874. When he resigned his seat on 7 August 1877, by taking the post of Steward of the Chiltern Hundreds, the announcement was described by The Times newspaper as "sudden".

== Personal life ==
In 1842 Corbett married Elizabeth Anne Theresa, the daughter of Robert Sholl and had five sons and eight daughters.

His eldest son, also named Edward Corbett (1843–1917), in April 1881 unsuccessfully contested a by-election in Northampton as a Conservative after the Liberal MP Charles Bradlaugh was unseated when he voted in the Commons before taking the Oath of Allegiance (he insisted on the right to affirm instead). Bradlaugh was again expelled from the Commons the following year, and Corbett junior again stood in the resulting by-election on 4 March 1882. Addressing a public meeting from the balcony of the Angel Hotel in Northampton on 23 February, he told the crowd that this was not an ordinary electoral contest, but a battle of principles. He hoped that the result would be to spare the House of Commons from the "disgreceful scenes" which had taken place over Bradlaugh's refusal to take the oath. However Bradlaugh was re-elected with Edward Corbett junior again failing to defeat him. Corbett junior never stood for parliament again.

Parliament of the United Kingdom
Preceded by Jasper More; Sir Percy Egerton Herbert	Member of Parliament for South Shropshire; 1868 – 1877; With: Sir Percy Egerton Herbert 1865–76; John Edmund Severne 1876–85	Succeeded by John Edmund Severne; Sir Baldwyn Leighton, Bt
