= John Edmund Severne =

English politician

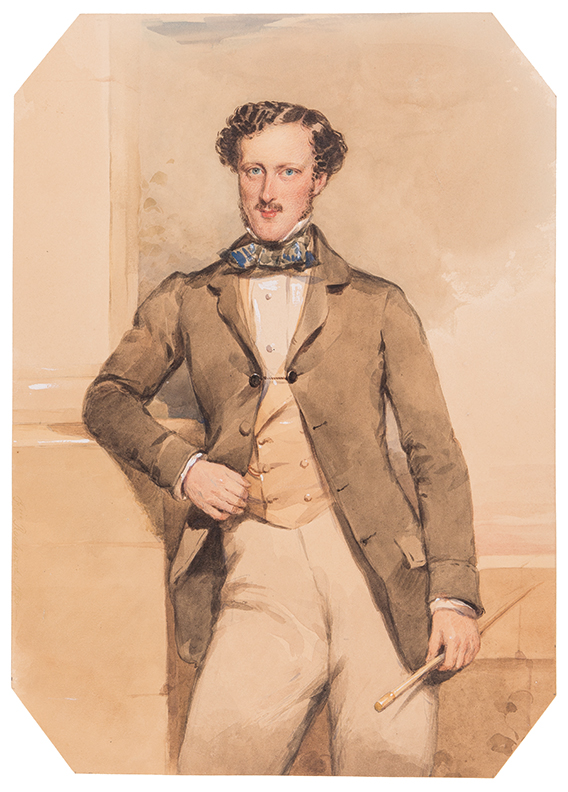
Portrait, signed and dated 1850, by Francois Theodore Rochard

John Edmund Severne (24 April 1826 – 21 April 1899) was an English Conservative politician who sat in the House of Commons from 1865 to 1885.

Severne was the son of John Michael Severne of Wallop Hall, Westbury near Shrewsbury and his wife Anna Maria Wigley daughter of Edmund Wigley of Shakenhurst, Worcestershire and MP for Worcester. He was educated at Brasenose College, Oxford where he rowed for the Brasenose eight in the university eights in 1846 and graduated in 1848. He joined the 10th Hussars in 1849 and became a lieutenant in 1852. He transferred by exchange of commission to the 16th Lancers and retired as a captain in 1857. He was a J.P. for Montgomeryshire and was High Sheriff of Montgomeryshire in 1854. He was also a JP and deputy lieutenant of Shropshire and Northamptonshire and was High Sheriff of Northamptonshire in 1861. He had extensive landed estates in all three counties, Wallop Hall being his seat in Shropshire, where he served on local government as an inaugural Alderman of Shropshire County Council from 1889, member of Atcham Rural District Council, and chairman of Westbury Parish Council.

In 1865 Severne was elected member of parliament for Ludlow and held the seat until 1868 when the representation was reduced to one member. At a by-election in 1875 Severne was elected MP for South Shropshire. He held the seat until 1885.

Severne died at 53 Eaton Place, Belgravia, London, aged 72, from a skull fracture sustained when knocked down by a van horse in Pall Mall three days earlier. He was buried in Westbury parish churchyard.

Severne married Florence Morgan Tighe, daughter of Very Rev. Hugh Usher Tighe, dean of Derry in 1858. Their marriage was childless so his next brother succeeded to his estates.

Parliament of the United Kingdom
Preceded by Sir William Fraser, Bt; George Windsor-Clive	Member of Parliament for Ludlow; 1865–1868; With: George Windsor-Clive	Succeeded by George Windsor-Clive
Preceded by Sir Percy Egerton Herbert; Edward Corbett	Member of Parliament for South Shropshire; 1876–1885; With: Edward Corbett to 1877; Sir Baldwyn Leighton, Bt from 1877	Constituency abolished
