= 1961 Oswestry by-election =

UK Parliamentary by-election

The 1961 Oswestry by-election was held on 9 November 1961. It was held due to the incumbent Conservative MP and Minister of State for Foreign Affairs, David Ormsby-Gore becoming the British Ambassador to Washington. The by-election was won by the future Conservative cabinet minister John Biffen, then aged 31.

== Candidates ==
The local Liberals selected 36 year old John Buchanan. He was born in July 1925 and was educated at Collyer's School, Horsham. He was standing for parliament for the first time.

== Result ==
Oswestry by-election, 1961
Party	Candidate	Votes	%	±%
Conservative	John Biffen	12,428	40.8	−15.1
Liberal	John R. Buchanan	8,647	28.4	+12.3
Labour	Brian Walden	8,519	28.0	0.0
Patriotic Front	John E. Dayton	839	2.8	New
Majority		3,781	12.4	−15.5
Turnout		30,433	60.8	−13.4
Conservative hold		Swing	-13.7	
