= Sir Baldwyn Leighton, 8th Baronet =

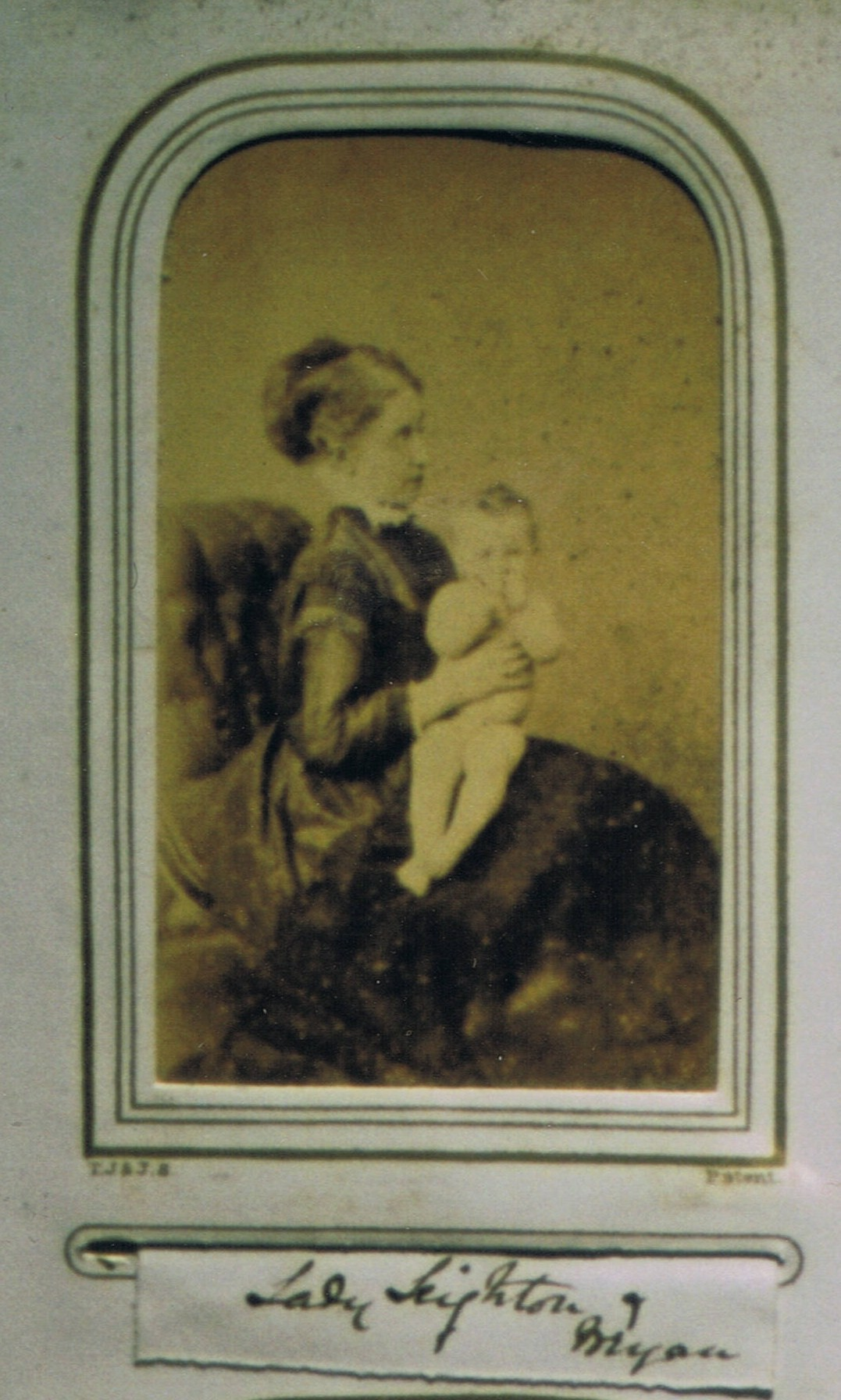
Lady Leighton and her son Bryan, from an 1860s album made by her aunt-in-law.

Sir Baldwyn Leighton, 8th Baronet (27 October 1836 – 22 January 1897) was an English Conservative Party politician who sat in the House of Commons from 1877 to 1885.

Leighton was the son of Sir Baldwin Leighton, 7th Baronet and his wife Mary Parker, daughter of Thomas Netherton Parker of Sweeney Hall, Shropshire. He was educated at Eton College and Christ Church, Oxford, graduating in 1859. He served in the rank of cornet in the South Salopian Yeomanry Cavalry and was a J.P. and Deputy Lieutenant for Shropshire. In 1871, he inherited the baronetcy on the death of his father. Leighton classed himself as a liberal Conservative and published several pamphlets on "Poor Law" and "Labour" for example. He also published "Letters of the late Edward Denison MP".

In August 1877, Leighton was elected at a by-election as a Member of Parliament (MP) for South Shropshire. He held the seat until the constituency was abolished in 1885.

Leighton died at the age of 60 and was buried in the parish churchyard of his family seat, Loton Park, at Alberbury, Shropshire.

Leighton married Hon. Eleanor Leicester Warren (1841-1914), daughter of George Warren, 2nd Baron de Tabley. Their son Bryan Leighton succeeded to the baronetcy. Leighton's brother Stanley Leighton was also a Shropshire MP.

== Gallery ==
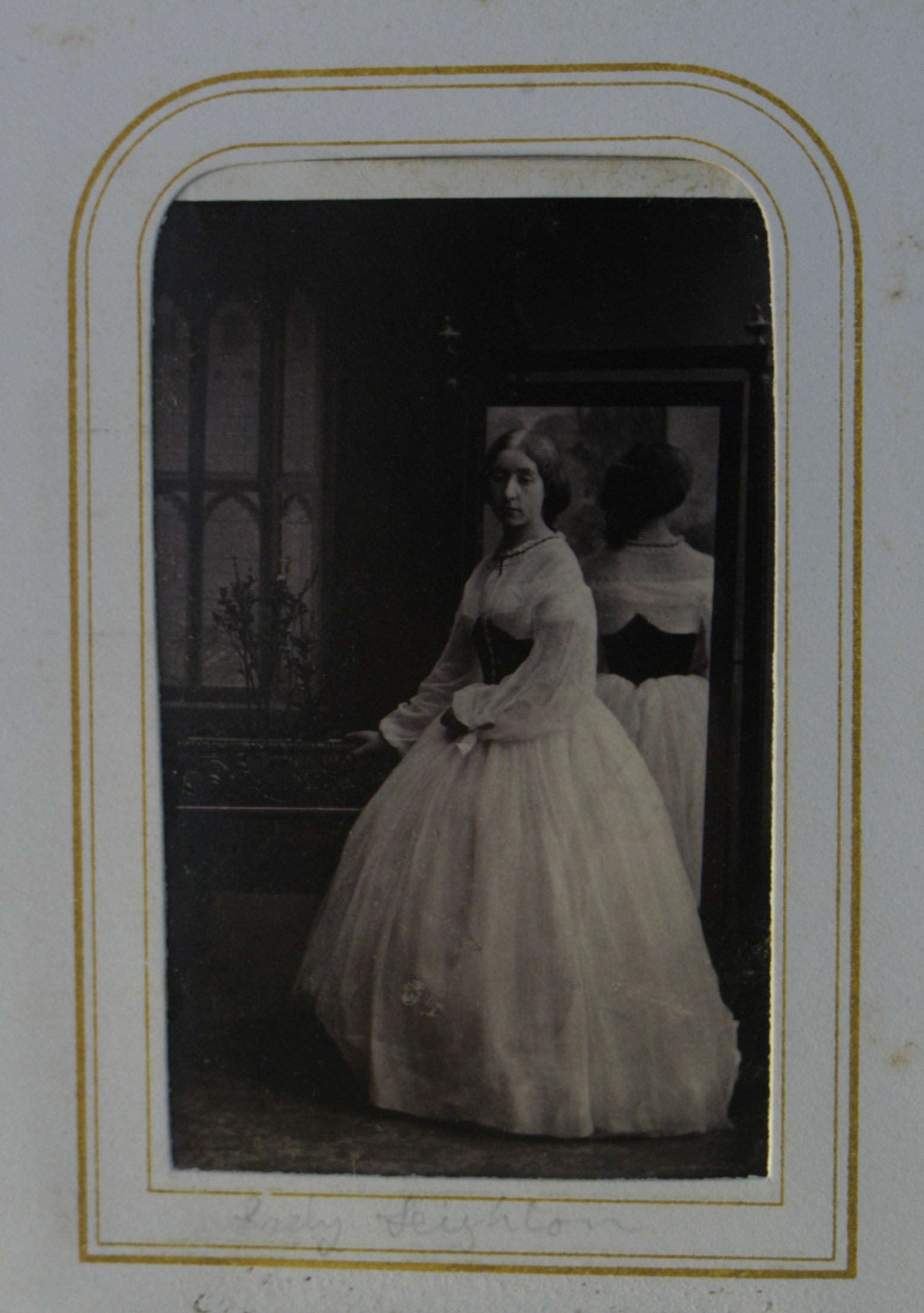
Eleanor (1841-14 August 1914), married (1864), Sir Baldwyn Leighton, MP, 8th Bt (1836-2 January 1897), of Loton, Salop. She was (the eventual) heir to her brother (3rd Lord De Tabley) in 1895, and in 1900 took the name Leighton-Warren

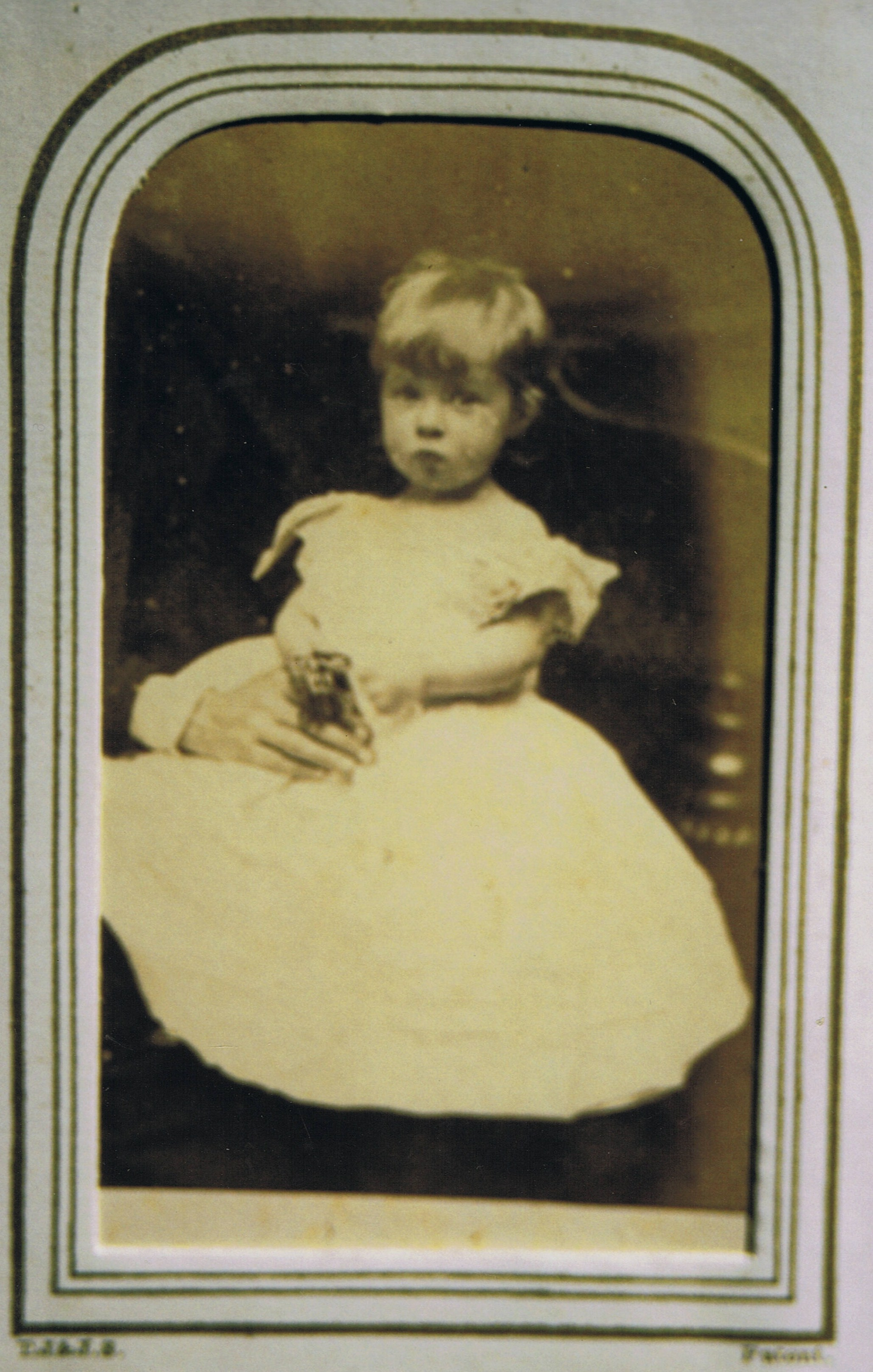
A daughter: Catherina Barbara Leighton (painter and photographer), as a child (1870- 2 October 1952). She married Alfred Sotheby (1871 - 9 October 1949), the youngest son of Admiral Sir Edward Southwell Sotheby, KCB (1813-1902), on 28 September 1909.

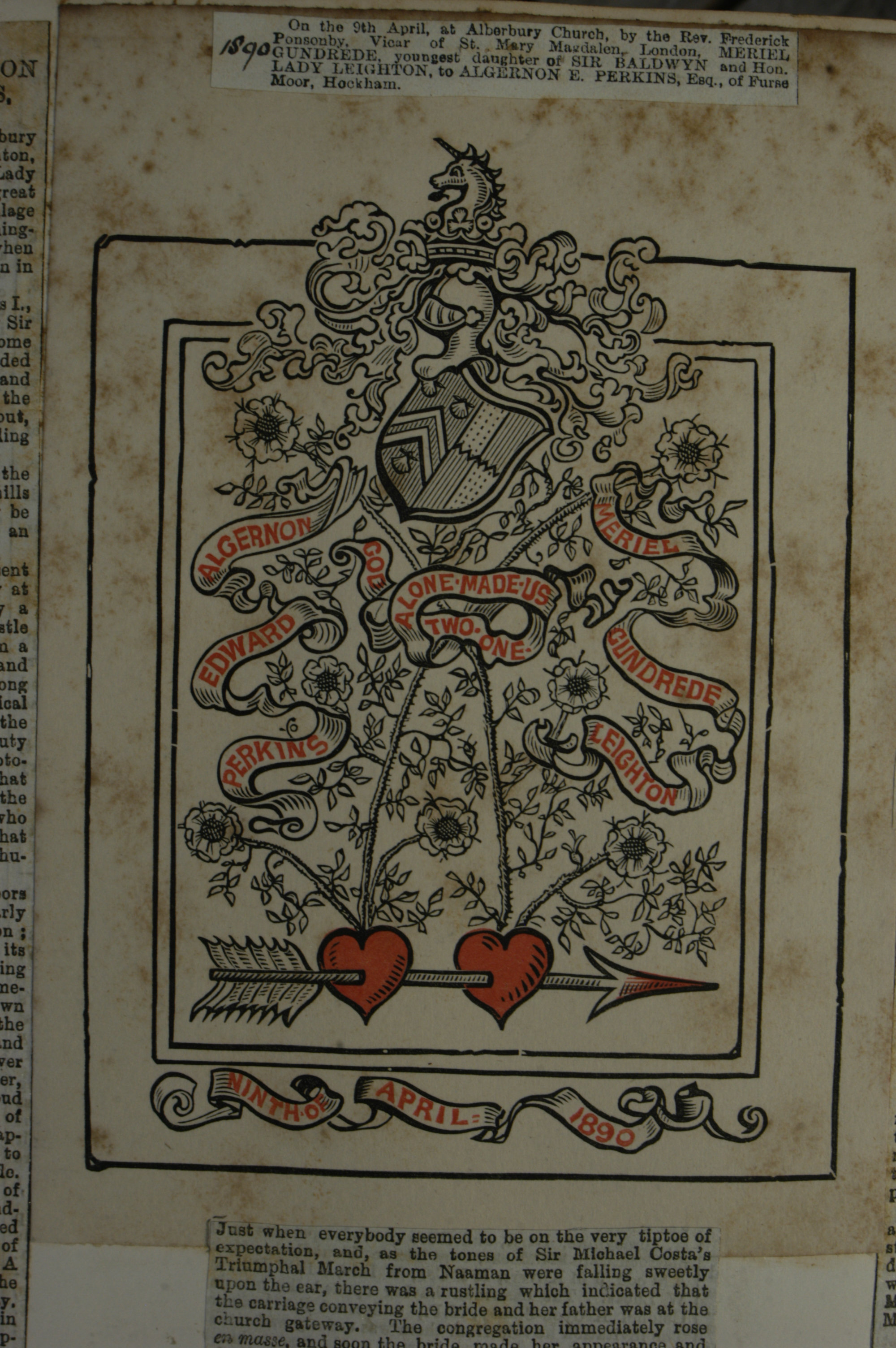
Marriage of Meriel Gundrede Leighton (d. 1947) & Algernon Edward Perkins (d. 1926), 9 April 1890

Parliament of the United Kingdom
Preceded by Edward Corbett; John Edmund Severne	Member of Parliament for South Shropshire; 1877 – 1885; With: John Edmund Severne	Constituency abolished
Baronetage of England
Preceded by Baldwin Leighton	Baronet (of Wattlesborough); 1871–1897	Succeeded by Bryan Leighton
