= Allan Heywood Bright =

Allan Heywood Bright (24 May 1862 – 3 August 1941) was a British Liberal politician.

== Early life ==
He was the son of Henry Arthur Bright JP of Ashfield, Knotty Ash, Liverpool and his wife, Mary Elizabeth (née Thompson), of nearby Thingwall Hall. Following education at Malvern and Harrow Schools, he became a member of the Liverpool firm of Rogers & Bright, tinplate merchants and ship agents, and in 1885 he married Edith Turner, a prominent campaigner for women's and workers' rights. They had one daughter. Bright was regarded as the leading member of the Liberal Party in Liverpool.

== Electoral contests and opposition to the Boer War ==
Bright's prominence in the party led to his being adopted as the Liberal candidate when a by-election was called at Exeter in November 1899. The by-election took place during the Second Boer War, and the candidate of the incumbent Conservative Party, Sir Edgar Vincent, was elected with a large majority. Bright, who opposed the war, felt that "in ordinary circumstances" he would have won, and signalled his willingness to stand again. In January 1900 he became a member of the South Africa Conciliation Committee, which was formed for the "dissemination of accurate information" on the war, and to seek an early "peaceable settlement between this country and the Boer Republics". The "khaki" general election was held later the same year, and Bright was again the Liberal candidate at Exeter. His identification as "anti war" meant that he was again heavily defeated.

In May 1901 the Conservative MP for the Oswestry division of Shropshire, Stanley Leighton, died. Bright was selected to fight the seat in the Liberal interest. By this time he had a residence at Weston Rhyn near Oswestry. Bright was again unsuccessful, attributing his defeat "to landlordism and to shortness of time". The victor was the Hon. George Ormsby-Gore.

== Member of parliament for Oswestry ==
Ormsby-Gore succeeded his father as Baron Harlech in 1904, making the Oswestry seat vacant once more. For the consequent by-election Bright was again chosen as the Liberal candidate, and The Times noted that he had "nursed the constituency assidiously of late". His opponent was William Bridgeman, a prominent Conservative and member of the London County Council. The poll was held on 26 July, and Bright was elected which was "a great surprise for both Conservatives and Liberals alike". He believed that the electorate had rejected the government, and that "the whole of Shropshire politics had been simply a policy of Tory bluff and the people seemed to have got tired of it".

Bright was only to be a member of the Commons for a short period. A general election was held at the beginning of 1906, and once again he stood against William Bridgeman. Following a bitter campaign where allegations of intimidation were made against the Conservatives, Bright was unseated.

== Later life ==
Bright continued to be active in the Liberal Party. In 1909 John Cheetham, Liberal MP for Stalybridge announced he would be retiring at the next general election due to ill health. Bright was selected as the party's candidate to replace Cheetham. The election was held in January 1910, but Bright failed to hold the seat for the Liberals, losing by 57 votes in spite of a large swing to the party in much of the country. A further general election was held at the end of the year, and Bright consented to be the Liberal candidate at Stalybridge again, but failed to regain the seat. He was director and later deputy chairman of the Union Bank of Manchester.

He retired to Barton Court, Colwall, Herefordshire, where his first wife died in January 1929. He was married again in the same year to Kelburn Milroy Ramsay, with whom he had a second daughter. By this time Bright had become an author, writing books on Middle English literature. In 1930 he donated 28 acres (110,000 m^{2}) of land on the Worcestershire Beacon to the Malvern Hills Conservators.

He died at Barton Court in August 1941, aged 79. He bequeathed his collection of 1,951 volumes on psychical research to the University of London.

Parliament of the United Kingdom
Preceded by Hon. George Ormsby-Gore	Member of Parliament for Oswestry; 1904–1906	Succeeded by Hon. William Bridgeman
