= South Shropshire (constituency) =

UK Parliament constituency (1832–1885, 2024 onwards)

Coordinates: 52.53°N 2.65°W

- County constituency for the House of Commons
- Boundaries since 2024
- Boundary of South Shropshire in West Midlands region
- County: Shropshire
- Major settlements: Bridgnorth, Ludlow

Current constituency
- Created: 2024
- Member of Parliament: Stuart Anderson (Conservative)
- Seats: One
- Created from: Ludlow; Shrewsbury and Atcham (minor part)

1832–1885
- Seats: Two
- Created from: Bishop's Castle and Shropshire
- Replaced by: Ludlow and Wellington

South Shropshire is a county constituency in Shropshire. It was first created in 1832 and was represented by two Knights of the Shire.

The constituency was abolished, along with North Shropshire, under the Redistribution of Seats Act 1885, with effect from the 1885 general election. The county was then split into four single-member constituencies: Ludlow, Newport, Oswestry and Wellington.

Further to the completion of the 2023 Periodic Review of Westminster constituencies, the seat was re-established for the 2024 general election, formed from the current constituency of Ludlow with only minor boundary changes. It has been represented since 2024 by Stuart Anderson of the Conservative Party.

== Constituency profile ==
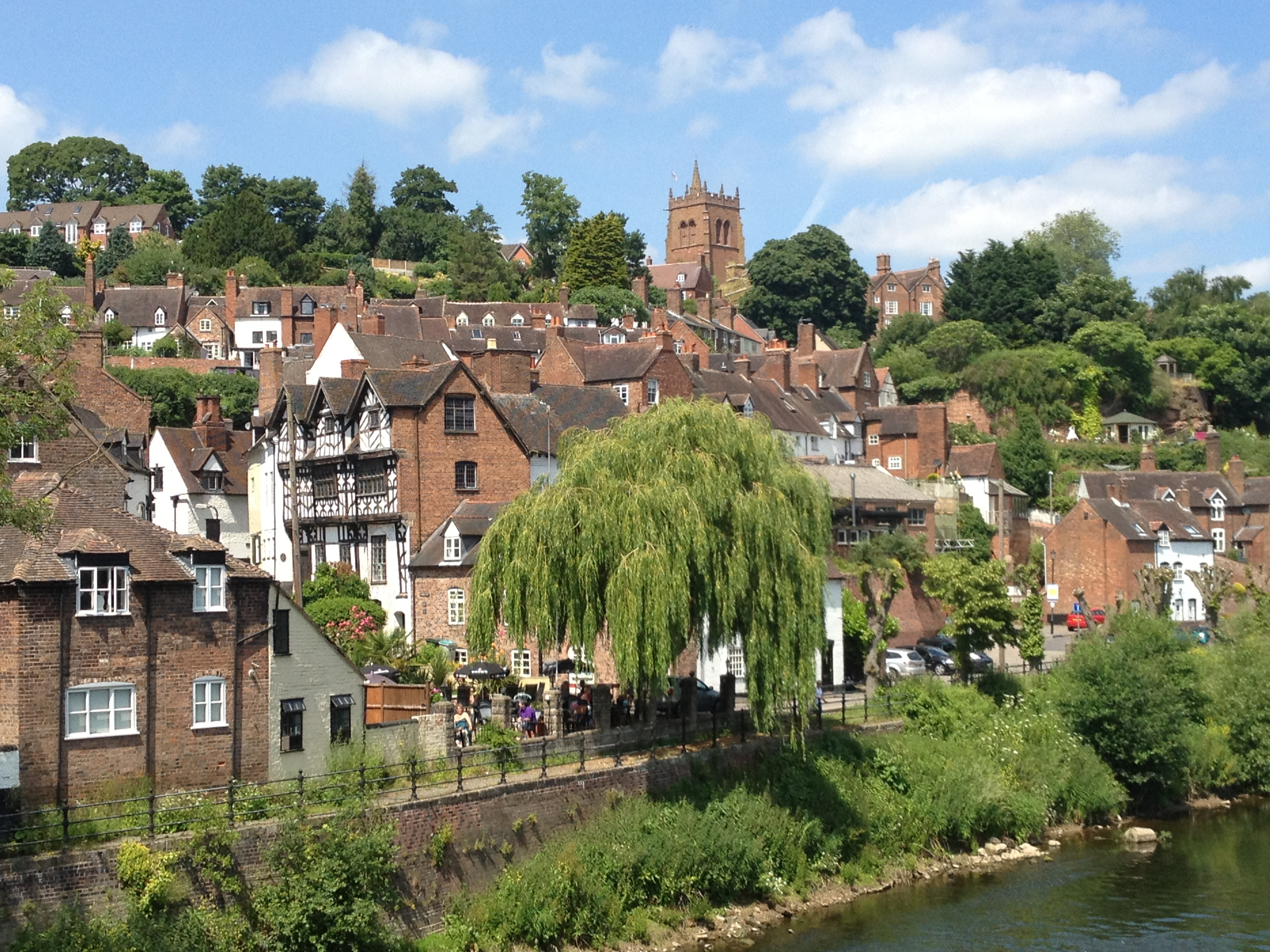
Bridgnorth

South Shropshire is a constituency in Shropshire in the West Midlands region of England. Its largest town is Bridgnorth, which has a population of around 12,000. Other settlements include the towns of Ludlow, Clun, Craven Arms, Bishop's Castle, Church Stretton, Much Wenlock, Broseley and Cleobury Mortimer and the village of Highley.

This is a large, rural constituency with many small market towns, villages and hamlets. Much of this constituency is taken up by the Shropshire Hills National Landscape, an area of upland moors and valleys, and the rural areas are predominantly agricultural. Bridgnorth and Ludlow are historic towns known for their Tudor and Jacobean architecture. This constituency lies along the England-Wales border; many of the villages close to the border have Welsh names and some residents in this area profess a Welsh identity. Ludlow's strategic location close to the border traditionally made it an important centre for administration. This constituency has average levels of wealth, although Bridgnorth is more affluent. House prices are generally similar to the UK average and higher than the rest of the West Midlands region.

South Shropshire has a very high retired population and low proportions of young and middle-aged adults. Residents have average levels of income and child poverty and high rates of homeownership. They have average levels of education and many residents are religious. A high proportion work in the agriculture, retail and manufacturing sectors, and the percentage claiming unemployment benefits is low. White people made up 98% of the population at the 2021 census.

At the local council, Ludlow and the west of the constituency are mostly represented by Liberal Democrats whilst Bridgnorth and the east predominantly elected Reform UK councillors. An estimated 56% of voters in South Shropshire supported leaving the European Union in the 2016 referendum, higher than the UK-wide figure of 52%.

== Boundaries ==
1832–1868. Extract from 1837 result: the southern doubly blue area. The cumbersome enclaves (belonging to Herefordshire) of "Farlow" etc. were deemed inclusions, and formally united with Shropshire in 1844.

=== Historic ===
1832–1885: The Hundreds of Brimstey, Chirbury, Condover, Ford, Munslow, Overs, Purslow (including Clun) and Stoddesdon, and the Franchise of Wenlock.

=== Current ===
The re-established constituency is composed of the following:

- The County of Shropshire electoral divisions of: Alveley and Claverley; Bishop’s Castle; Bridgnorth East and Astley Abbotts; Bridgnorth West and Tasley; Broseley; Brown Clee; Burnell; Chirbury and Worthen; Church Stretton and Craven Arms; Clee; Cleobury Mortimer; Clun; Corvedale; Highley; Ludlow East; Ludlow North; Ludlow South; Much Wenlock; Severn Valley; Worfield.

It comprises the former constituency of Ludlow, with the addition of the Burnell and Severn Valley electoral division from Shrewsbury and Atcham (re-established as Shrewsbury).

== Members of Parliament ==
=== MPs 1832–1885 ===
Election	First member	First party	Second member	Second party
1832	The Earl of Darlington	Tory	Hon. Robert Clive	Tory
1834	The Earl of Darlington	Conservative	Hon. Robert Clive	Conservative
1842 by-election	Viscount Newport	Conservative	Hon. Robert Clive	Conservative
1854 by-election	Viscount Newport	Conservative	Hon. Robert Windsor-Clive	Conservative
1859 by-election	Viscount Newport	Conservative	Sir Baldwin Leighton, Bt	Conservative
April 1865 by-election	Hon. Sir Percy Egerton Herbert	Conservative	Sir Baldwin Leighton, Bt	Conservative
July 1865	Hon. Sir Percy Egerton Herbert	Conservative	Jasper More	Liberal
1868	Hon. Sir Percy Egerton Herbert	Conservative	Edward Corbett	Conservative
1876 by-election	John Edmund Severne	Conservative	Edward Corbett	Conservative
1877 by-election	John Edmund Severne	Conservative	Sir Baldwyn Leighton, Bt	Conservative
1885	Constituency abolished			

=== MPs since 2024 ===
Ludlow prior to 2024

Election	Member	Party
2024	Stuart Anderson	Conservative

== Elections ==
=== Elections in the 2020s ===
General election 2024: South Shropshire
Party	Candidate	Votes	%	±%
Conservative	Stuart Anderson	17,628	34.1	−31.3
Liberal Democrats	Matthew Green	16,004	31.0	+15.6
Reform	Charles Shackerley-Bennett	9,171	17.8	N/A
Labour	Simon Thomson	6,939	13.4	−2.4
Green	Hilary Wendt	1,911	3.7	+0.2
Majority		1,624	3.1	N/A
Turnout		51,653	67.6	N/A
Registered electors		76,723		
Conservative win (new seat)				

In order to assess the impact of the boundary changes, various organisations calculated the notional result of the 2019 election if it had been conducted under the boundaries established by the 2023 Periodic Review. Below is such an assessment from the BBC for South Shropshire:

Notional result of 2019 election under new (2023) boundaries

UK General Election, 2019 Notional Result: South Shropshire
Party	Candidate	Votes	%	±%
Conservative		37,752	65.4	
Labour		9,116	15.8	
Liberal Democrats		8,869	15.4	
Green		1,999	3.5	
Majority		28,636	49.6	
Conservative hold		Swing		

For more information see Notional results of the 2019 United Kingdom general election by 2024 constituency.

== Elections 1832–1885 ==
=== Elections in the 1880s ===
General election 1880: South Shropshire
Party	Candidate	Votes	%	±%
Conservative	Baldwyn Leighton	2,491	29.3	N/A
Conservative	John Edmund Severne	2,216	26.1	N/A
Liberal	Jasper More	2,149	25.3	New
Liberal	John William Handley Davenport	1,634	19.2	New
Majority		67	0.8	N/A
Turnout		4,245 (est)	74.6 (est)	N/A
Registered electors		5,690		
Conservative hold		Swing	N/A	
Conservative hold		Swing	N/A	

=== Elections in the 1870s ===
By-election, 10 August 1877: South Shropshire
Party	Candidate	Votes	%	±%
Conservative	Baldwyn Leighton	Unopposed		
Conservative hold				

By-election, 3 November 1876: South Shropshire
Party	Candidate	Votes	%	±%
Conservative	John Edmund Severne	Unopposed		
Conservative hold				

Corbett resigned, triggering a by-election.

General election 1874: South Shropshire
Party	Candidate	Votes	%	±%
Conservative	Edward Corbett	Unopposed		
Conservative	Percy Egerton Herbert	Unopposed		
Registered electors		5,710		
Conservative hold				
Conservative hold				

Herbert's death triggered a by-election.

=== Elections in the 1860s ===
General election 1868: South Shropshire
Party	Candidate	Votes	%	±%
Conservative	Percy Egerton Herbert	2,703	36.6	+2.4
Conservative	Edward Corbett	2,514	34.1	+5.6
Liberal	Jasper More	2,161	29.3	−8.0
Majority		353	4.8	N/A
Turnout		4,770 (est)	81.6 (est)	+1.3
Registered electors		5,847		
Conservative hold		Swing	+3.2	
Conservative gain from Liberal		Swing	+4.8	

By-election, 8 March 1867: South Shropshire
Party	Candidate	Votes	%	±%
Conservative	Percy Egerton Herbert	Unopposed		
Conservative hold				

General election 1865: South Shropshire
Party	Candidate	Votes	%	±%
Liberal	Jasper More	1,819	37.3	New
Conservative	Percy Egerton Herbert	1,669	34.2	N/A
Conservative	Baldwin Leighton	1,388	28.5	N/A
Majority		431	8.8	N/A
Turnout		3,348 (est)	80.3 (est)	N/A
Registered electors		4,170		
Liberal gain from Conservative				
Conservative hold				

Herbert was appointed Treasurer of the Household, triggering a by-election.

By-election, 12 April 1865: South Shropshire
Party	Candidate	Votes	%	±%
Conservative	Percy Egerton Herbert	Unopposed		
Conservative hold				

=== Elections in the 1850s ===
By-election, 14 September 1859: South Shropshire
Party	Candidate	Votes	%	±%
Conservative	Baldwin Leighton	Unopposed		
Conservative hold				

Bridgeman succeeded to the peerage, becoming 3rd Earl of Bradford, triggering a by-election.

General election 1859: South Shropshire
Party	Candidate	Votes	%	±%
Conservative	Orlando Bridgeman	Unopposed		
Conservative	Robert Windsor-Clive	Unopposed		
Registered electors		3,380		
Conservative hold				
Conservative hold				

Windsor-Clive's death triggered a by-election.

By-election, 9 March 1858: South Shropshire
Party	Candidate	Votes	%	±%
Conservative	Orlando Bridgeman	Unopposed		
Conservative hold				

General election 1857: South Shropshire
Party	Candidate	Votes	%	±%
Conservative	Orlando Bridgeman	Unopposed		
Conservative	Robert Windsor-Clive	Unopposed		
Registered electors		3,183		
Conservative hold				
Conservative hold				

Bridgeman was appointed Vice-Chamberlain of the Household, triggering a by-election.

By-election, 8 February 1854: South Shropshire
Party	Candidate	Votes	%	±%
Conservative	Robert Windsor Clive	Unopposed		
Conservative hold				

General election 1852: South Shropshire
Party	Candidate	Votes	%	±%
Conservative	Orlando Bridgeman	Unopposed		
Conservative	Robert Clive	Unopposed		
Registered electors		3,571		
Conservative hold				
Conservative hold				

Clive's death triggered a by-election.

By-election, 23 March 1852: South Shropshire
Party	Candidate	Votes	%	±%
Conservative	Orlando Bridgeman	Unopposed		
Conservative hold				

=== Elections in the 1840s ===
General election 1847: South Shropshire
Party	Candidate	Votes	%	±%
Conservative	Orlando Bridgeman	Unopposed		
Conservative	Robert Clive	Unopposed		
Registered electors		3,678		
Conservative hold				
Conservative hold				

Bridgeman was appointed Vice-Chamberlain of the Household, triggering a by-election.

By-election, 3 March 1842: South Shropshire
Party	Candidate	Votes	%	±%
Conservative	Orlando Bridgeman	Unopposed		
Conservative hold				

General election 1841: South Shropshire
Party	Candidate	Votes	%	±%
Conservative	Henry Vane	Unopposed		
Conservative	Robert Clive	Unopposed		
Registered electors		3,831		
Conservative hold				
Conservative hold				

Vane succeeded to the peerage, becoming 2nd Duke of Cleveland, triggering a by-election.

=== Elections in the 1830s ===
General election 1837: South Shropshire
Party	Candidate	Votes	%
Conservative	Henry Vane	Unopposed	
Conservative	Robert Clive	Unopposed	
Registered electors		3,240	
Conservative hold			
Conservative hold			

General election 1835: South Shropshire
Party	Candidate	Votes	%
Conservative	Henry Vane	Unopposed	
Conservative	Robert Clive	Unopposed	
Registered electors		2,852	
Conservative hold			
Conservative hold			

General election 1832: South Shropshire
Party	Candidate	Votes	%
Tory	Henry Vane	642	52.0
Tory	Robert Clive	573	46.4
Tory	Thomas Whitmore	20	1.6
Majority		553	44.8
Turnout		661	23.7
Registered electors		2,791	
Tory win (new seat)			
Tory win (new seat)			

- Whitmore retired in favour of Clive before the poll concluded.

== See also ==
- Parliamentary constituencies in Shropshire
- List of former United Kingdom Parliament constituencies
- Unreformed House of Commons

== Sources ==
- Leigh Rayment's Historical List of MPs – Constituencies beginning with "S" (part 3)
- Craig, F. W. S. (1989) [1977]. British parliamentary election results 1832–1885 (2nd ed.). Chichester: Parliamentary Research Services. pp. 448–449. ISBN 0-900178-26-4.
