= Sir Baldwin Leighton, 7th Baronet =

English landowner and politician (1805–1871)

Sir Baldwin Leighton, Bt
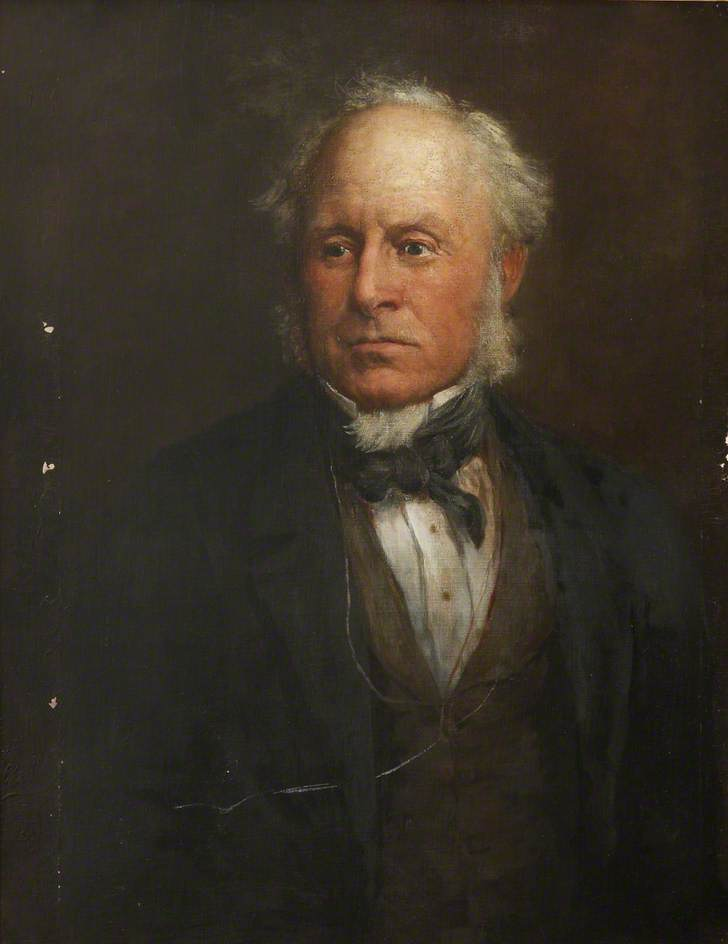
- Oil Painting of Baldwin Leighton from Shropshire Museums Collections
- Born: 14 May 1805
- Died: 22 January 1871 (aged 65); Norton Hall
- Resting place: Loton Park's parish churchyard of St Michael, Alberbury.
- Occupation: Member of Parliament for South Shropshire
- Spouse: Mary Parker
- Children: Baldwyn, Stanley, and Charlotte

Sir Baldwin Leighton, 7th Baronet (14 May 1805 – 26 February 1871) was an English landowner and politician, who sat in the House of Commons from 1859 to 1865.

Leighton was the son of Sir Baldwin Leighton, 6th Baronet and his second wife Anne Stanley of Alderley, Cheshire. His father was an army general and governor of Carrickfergus Castle, and had inherited the baronetcy, with estates centred at Loton Park, Shropshire, from his cousin in 1819. Leighton inherited the baronetcy on the death of his father in 1828 and was High Sheriff of Shropshire in 1835. He served in the local yeomanry, initially as cornet in 1824 and captain in 1828 of the then Shrewsbury Yeomanry Cavalry, continuing to serve after they merged into the South Salopian Yeomanry Cavalry in the latter year.

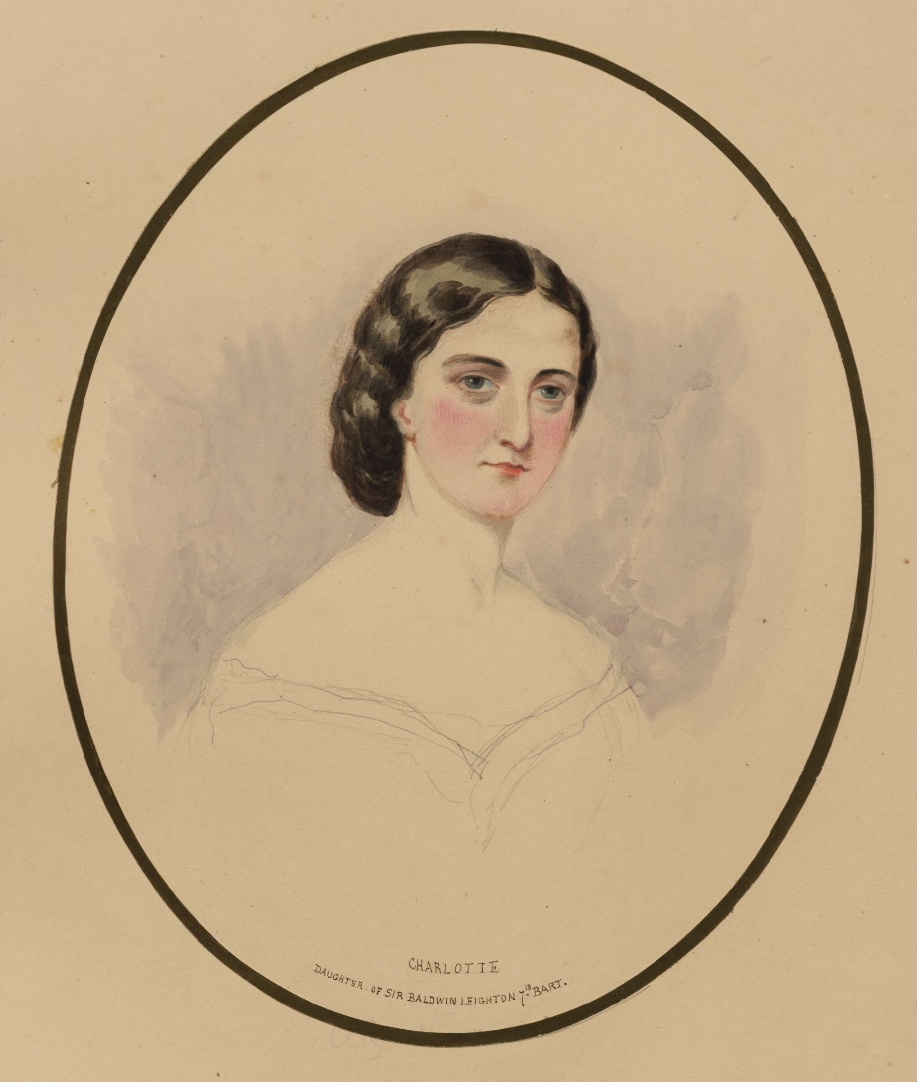
Charlotte d. of Sir Baldwyn Leighton painted by her mother

In the 1859 general election, Leighton was elected Member of Parliament for South Shropshire. He held the seat until the 1865 general election.

Leighton married Mary Parker of Sweeney Hall near Oswestry, Shropshire, in 1832. She inherited the Sweeney estate on the death of her brother Rev. John Parker an amateur artist and prolific painter. She was also a very competent amateur artist and her works include a portrait of her husband in Egyptian attire.

Their sons Baldwyn Leighton and Stanley Leighton both represented Shropshire seats in parliament. Their daughter Charlotte married General William Feilding.

Leighton died at Norton Hall, near Daventry, Northamptonshire on 26 January 1871 aged 65, and was buried in Loton Park's parish churchyard of St Michael, Alberbury.

== Gallery ==
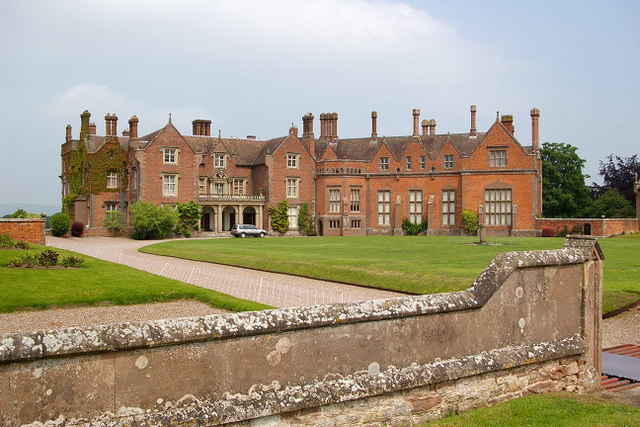
Loton Park, Shropshire

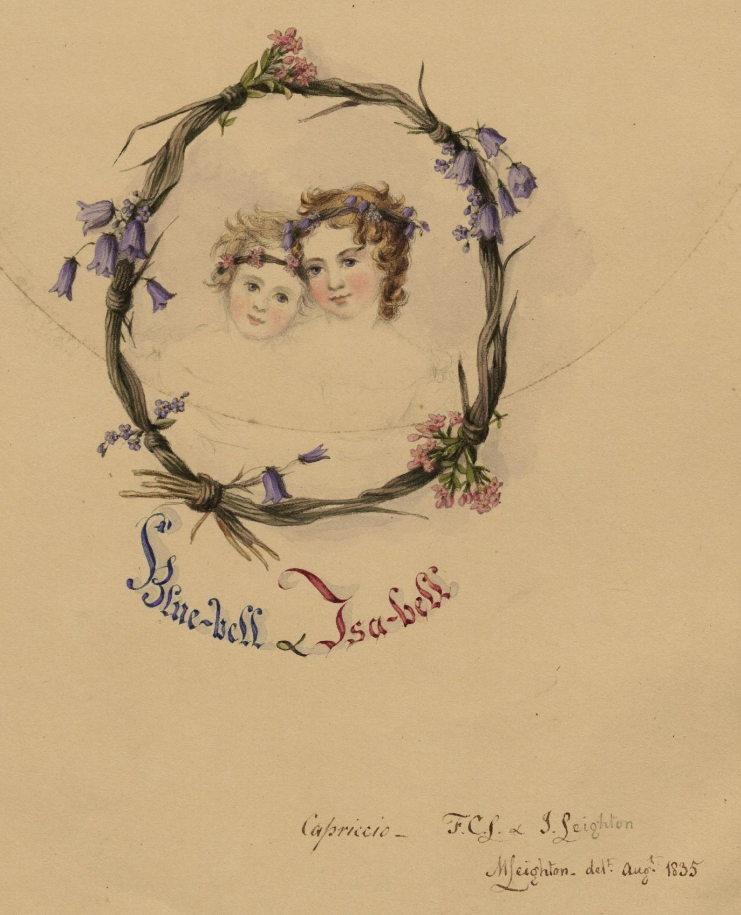
Frances Christina Leighton & Isabella Leighton, children of Sir Baldwyn Leighton. 1835

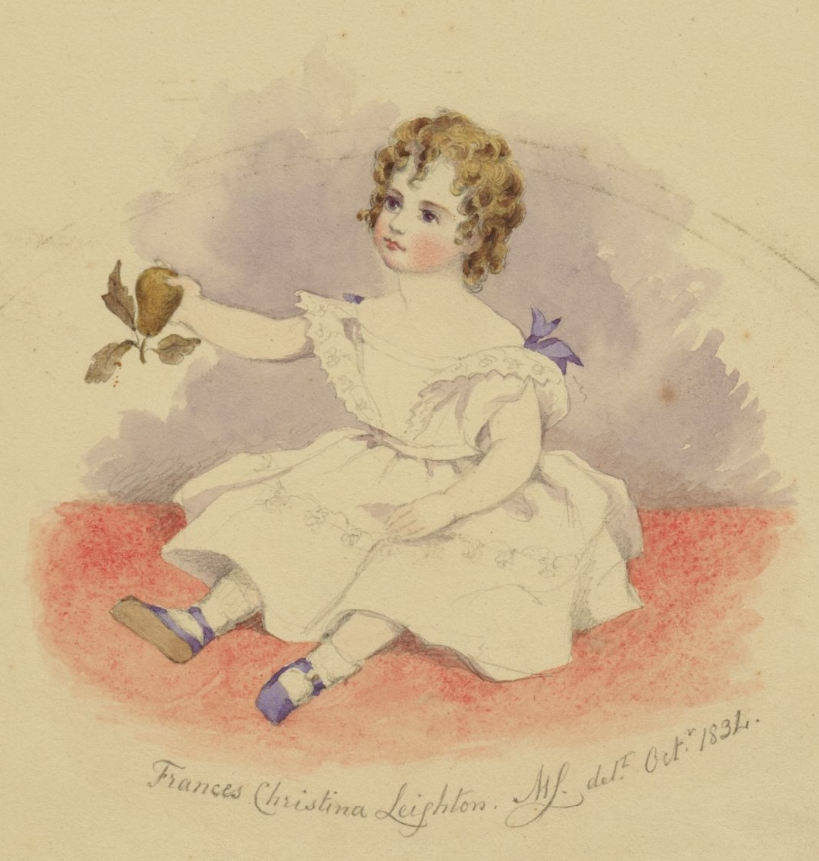
Frances Christina Leighton daughter of Sir Baldwyn Leighton.

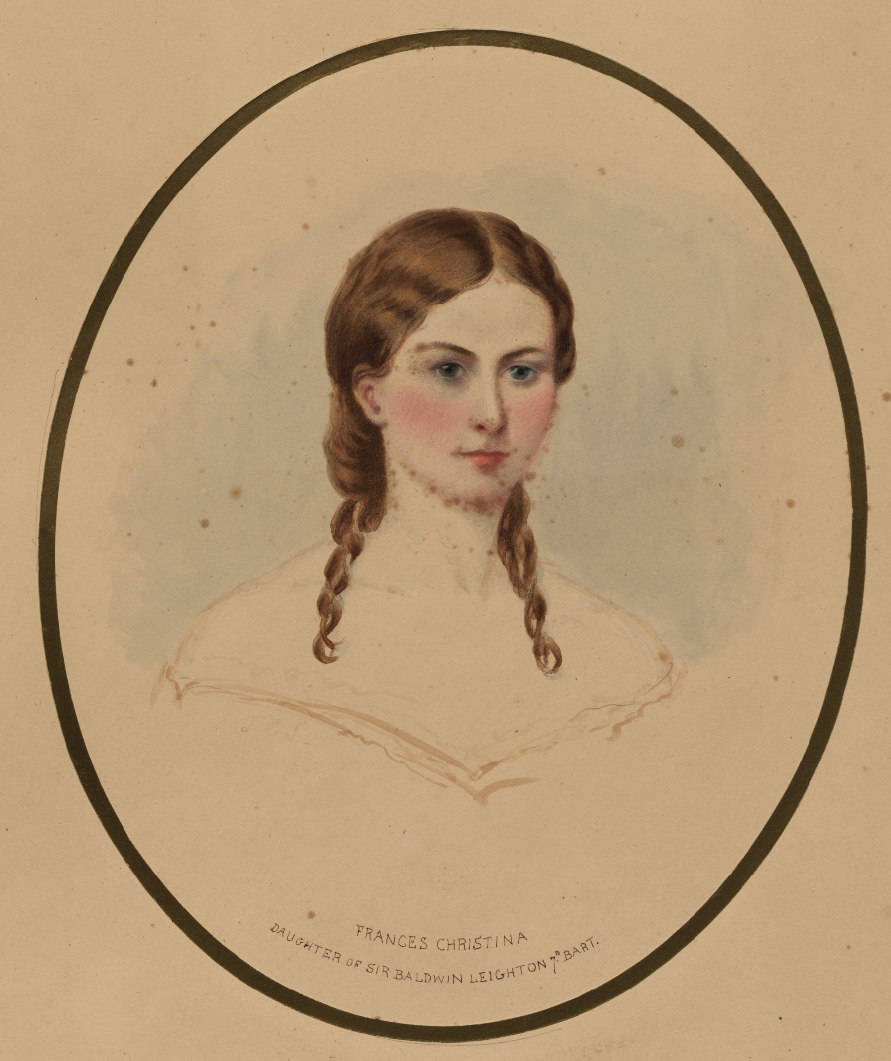
Frances Christina Leighton

Parliament of the United Kingdom
Preceded by Robert Windsor-Clive; Viscount Newport	Member of Parliament for South Shropshire; 1859 – 1865; With: Viscount Newport 1859 – 1865; Percy Egerton Herbert 1865	Succeeded by Percy Egerton Herbert; Jasper More
Baronetage of England
Preceded by Baldwin Leighton	Baronet (of Wattlesborough); 1828–1871	Succeeded by Baldwyn Leighton
Honorary titles
Preceded by Henry Wentworth Powys	High Sheriff of Shropshire; 1835	Succeeded by Sir William Rouse-Boughton, 2nd Baronet,
