= Sir Baldwin Leighton, 6th Baronet =

British Army officer

General Sir Baldwin Leighton Bt
- Born: 15 January 1747
- Died: 13 November 1828 (aged 81); Loton Park, Shropshire, England
- Burial place: Alberbury, Shropshire, England
- Military career
- Allegiance: United Kingdom
- Branch: British Army
- Rank: General
- Commands: Governor of Carrickfergus
- Conflicts: American Revolutionary War

General Sir Baldwin Leighton, 6th Baronet (15 January 1747 – 13 November 1828) was a senior English officer in the British Army.

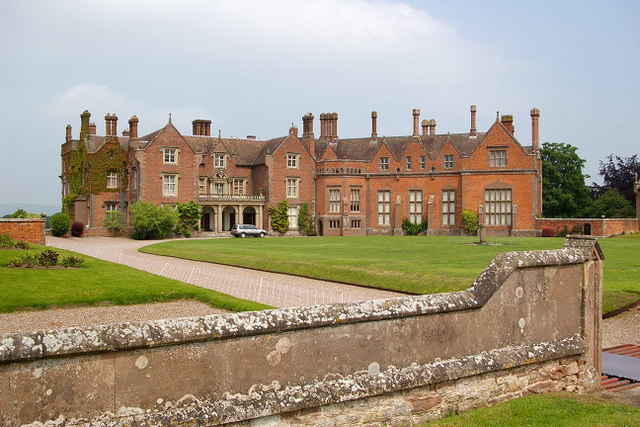
Loton Park, Shropshire

Leighton was the son of Baldwin Leighton, the 2nd son of Sir Edward Leighton, 2nd Baronet.

He joined the army in 1760 by purchasing a lieutenancy (at the age of 13) in Captain Jenning's company, which in that same year became part of the 96th Regiment and was posted to India. There Leighton undertook garrison duties at Fort St George before taking to the field. After the Treaty of Paris (1763) the regiment returned to England and was disbanded.

In 1768 he purchased a promotion in the 46th Regiment. In 1775, as a captain of grenadiers, he was posted to North America, where he saw action in the New York and New Jersey campaign at Brooklyn, Long Island, the taking of New York, at York Island, White Plains, the storming of Fort Washington and the actions at Rhode Island and Brandywine. He was severely wounded at the action near Monmouth Court House. In 1778, suffering from the effects of campaigning, he returned to England to take command of a recruitment company.

In 1787 he purchased a majority in the regiment and left for Gibraltar in 1792, where he was promoted lieutenant colonel. The following year he sailed to the West Indies as the regiment's Lieutenant-Colonel, where in numerous actions against the French, the regiment lost 400 of its 520 men. In 1797 he was promoted to colonel by brevet. He returned again to England and was sent to Portugal as a brigadier-general. Returning home in 1802 he was placed on the Home Staff in Newcastle-upon-Tyne and Sunderland and served as Mayor of Shrewsbury for 1806–07. He was promoted to major general in 1803 and to lieutenant general in 1809. In 1809 he was sent to Jersey, where he acted as Lieutenant-Governor during the temporary absence of General Sir George Don.

In 1809 he was transferred to the 3rd Garrison Battalion, which was reduced in 1817. He was made Governor of Carrickfergus on 30 January 1817, and held the office, a sinecure that paid £159 p.a., until he died at his seat, Loton Park, Shropshire in 1828.

In 1819 he succeeded his cousin Sir Robert Leighton, son of his uncle Sir Charlton Leighton, 4th Baronet, to the Leighton baronetcy of Wattlesborough and to the family seat at Loton Park in Shropshire. He was promoted full general in the Army in August of the same year.

He had married twice; firstly Anne, the daughter of the Revd William Pigott and secondly in 1802 Louisa Margaret Anne, sister of Sir John Thomas Stanley of Alderley Park, Cheshire. With her he had a son and heir, Sir Baldwin Leighton, 7th Baronet.

Baronetage of England
Preceded by Robert Leighton	Baronet (of Wattlesborough); 1819–1828	Succeeded by Baldwyn Leighton
