= Oswestry (constituency) =

Parliamentary constituency in the United Kingdom, 1885–1983

- Former county constituency for the House of Commons
- Oswestry in Shropshire, 1918–1950

1885–1983
- Seats: one
- Created from: North Shropshire
- Replaced by: North Shropshire

Oswestry was a United Kingdom Parliamentary constituency. It was a constituency of the House of Commons of the Parliament of the United Kingdom from 1885 to 1983, when it was renamed North Shropshire. It elected one Member of Parliament (MP) by the first past the post method of election.

== Boundaries ==
1885–1918: The Borough of Oswestry, the Sessional Divisions of Chirbury, Condover, Ford, Oswestry, and Pimhill (except Myddle), and the parish of Fitz.

1918–1949: The Borough of Oswestry, the Urban Districts of Ellesmere, Market Drayton, Wem, and Whitchurch, and the Rural Districts of Drayton, Ellesmere, Oswestry, Wem, and Whitchurch.

1950–1966: The Borough of Oswestry, the Urban Districts of Ellesmere, Market Drayton, Wem, and Whitchurch, and the Rural Districts of Drayton, Ellesmere, Oswestry, and Wem.

1966–1967: The Borough of Oswestry, the Urban Districts of Ellesmere, Wem, and Whitchurch, and the Rural Districts of Ellesmere, Market Drayton, Oswestry, and Wem.

1967–1974: The Rural Districts of Market Drayton, North Shropshire and Oswestry.

1974–1983: The District of North Shropshire and the Borough of Oswestry.

== Members of Parliament ==
| Election | Member | Party |
|---|---|---|
| 1885 | Stanley Leighton | Conservative |
| 1901 by-election | George Ormsby-Gore | Conservative |
| 1904 | Allan Heywood Bright | Liberal |
| 1906 | William Bridgeman | Conservative |
| 1929 | Bertie Leighton | Conservative |
| 1945 | Oliver Poole | Conservative |
| 1950 | David Ormsby-Gore | Conservative |
| 1961 | John Biffen | Conservative |
| 1983 | Constituency abolished | |

== Election results ==
=== Elections in the 1880s ===
Jephson

General election 1885: Oswestry
| Party | Candidate | Votes | % | ±% |
|---|---|---|---|---|
| Conservative | Stanley Leighton | 4,753 | 55.8 | |
| Liberal | Henry Lorenzo Jephson | 3,772 | 44.2 | |
| Majority | | 981 | 11.6 | |
| Turnout | | 8,525 | 84.5 | |
| Registered electors | | 10,083 | | |
| Conservative win (new seat) | | | | |

Leighton

General election 1886: Oswestry
| Party | Candidate | Votes | % | ±% |
|---|---|---|---|---|
| Conservative | Stanley Leighton | Unopposed | | |
| Conservative hold | | | | |

=== Elections in the 1890s ===
General election 1892: Oswestry
| Party | Candidate | Votes | % | ±% |
|---|---|---|---|---|
| Conservative | Stanley Leighton | Unopposed | | |
| Conservative hold | | | | |

General election 1895: Oswestry
| Party | Candidate | Votes | % | ±% |
|---|---|---|---|---|
| Conservative | Stanley Leighton | 4,605 | 56.1 | N/A |
| Liberal | Owen Thomas | 3,598 | 43.9 | New |
| Majority | | 1,007 | 12.2 | N/A |
| Turnout | | 8,203 | 82.4 | N/A |
| Registered electors | | 9,958 | | |
| Conservative hold | | Swing | N/A | |

=== Elections in the 1900s ===
General election 1900: Oswestry
| Party | Candidate | Votes | % | ±% |
|---|---|---|---|---|
| Conservative | Stanley Leighton | Unopposed | | |
| Conservative hold | | | | |

1901 Oswestry by-election
| Party | Candidate | Votes | % | ±% |
|---|---|---|---|---|
| Conservative | George Ormsby-Gore | 4,518 | 56.8 | N/A |
| Liberal | Allan Bright | 3,430 | 43.2 | New |
| Majority | | 1,088 | 13.6 | N/A |
| Turnout | | 7,948 | 79.5 | N/A |
| Registered electors | | 9,998 | | |
| Conservative hold | | Swing | N/A | |

1904 Oswestry by-election
| Party | Candidate | Votes | % | ±% |
|---|---|---|---|---|
| Liberal | Allan Bright | 4,542 | 52.2 | N/A |
| Conservative | William Bridgeman | 4,157 | 47.8 | N/A |
| Majority | | 385 | 4.4 | N/A |
| Turnout | | 8,699 | 86.3 | N/A |
| Registered electors | | 10,075 | | |
| Liberal gain from Conservative | | Swing | N/A | |

General election 1906: Oswestry
| Party | Candidate | Votes | % | ±% |
|---|---|---|---|---|
| Conservative | William Bridgeman | 5,011 | 52.6 | N/A |
| Liberal | Allan Bright | 4,508 | 47.4 | N/A |
| Majority | | 503 | 5.2 | N/A |
| Turnout | | 9,519 | 90.7 | N/A |
| Registered electors | | 10,490 | | |
| Conservative gain from Liberal | | Swing | | |

=== Elections in the 1910s ===
General election January 1910: Oswestry
| Party | Candidate | Votes | % | ±% |
|---|---|---|---|---|
| Conservative | William Bridgeman | 5,003 | 53.3 | +0.7 |
| Liberal | Edward Powell | 4,379 | 46.7 | −0.7 |
| Majority | | 624 | 6.6 | +1.4 |
| Turnout | | 9,382 | 92.4 | +1.7 |
| Registered electors | | 10,151 | | |
| Conservative hold | | Swing | +0.7 | |

General election December 1910: Oswestry
| Party | Candidate | Votes | % | ±% |
|---|---|---|---|---|
| Conservative | William Bridgeman | 4,867 | 54.1 | +0.8 |
| Liberal | Edward Powell | 4,121 | 45.9 | −0.8 |
| Majority | | 746 | 8.2 | +1.6 |
| Turnout | | 8,988 | 88.5 | −3.9 |
| Registered electors | | 10,151 | | |
| Conservative hold | | Swing | +0.8 | |

General Election 1914–15:

Another General Election was required to take place before the end of 1915. The political parties had been making preparations for an election to take place and by July 1914, the following candidates had been selected;

- Unionist: William Bridgeman
- Liberal:

General election 1918: Oswestry
| Party | | Candidate | Votes | % | ±% |
|---|---|---|---|---|---|
| C | Unionist | William Bridgeman | 12,276 | 59.2 | +5.1 |
| | Labour | Thomas Morris | 8,467 | 40.8 | New |
| Majority | | | 3,809 | 18.4 | +10.2 |
| Turnout | | | 20,743 | 64.9 | −23.6 |
| | Unionist hold | | Swing | | |
C indicates candidate endorsed by the coalition government.

=== Elections in the 1920s ===
General election 1922: Oswestry
| Party | Candidate | Votes | % | ±% |
|---|---|---|---|---|
| Unionist | William Bridgeman | 12,837 | 50.2 | −9.0 |
| Liberal | Russell Sidebottom | 6,660 | 26.0 | New |
| Labour | Thomas Morris | 6,105 | 23.8 | −17.0 |
| Majority | | 6,177 | 24.2 | +5.8 |
| Turnout | | 25,602 | 80.2 | +15.3 |
| Unionist hold | | Swing | | |

General election 1923: Oswestry
| Party | Candidate | Votes | % | ±% |
|---|---|---|---|---|
| Unionist | William Bridgeman | 11,528 | 46.6 | −3.6 |
| Liberal | Russell Sidebottom | 9,713 | 39.3 | +13.3 |
| Labour | Sidney Ronald Campion | 3,477 | 14.1 | −9.7 |
| Majority | | 1,815 | 7.3 | −16.9 |
| Turnout | | 24,718 | 75.8 | −4.4 |
| Unionist hold | | Swing | -8.5 | |

General election 1924: Oswestry
| Party | Candidate | Votes | % | ±% |
|---|---|---|---|---|
| Unionist | William Bridgeman | 14,316 | 55.1 | +8.5 |
| Liberal | Russell Sidebottom | 6,143 | 23.7 | −15.6 |
| Labour | Thomas Morris | 5,503 | 21.2 | +7.1 |
| Majority | | 8,173 | 31.4 | +24.1 |
| Turnout | | 25,962 | 78.9 | +3.1 |
| Unionist hold | | Swing | +12.0 | |

General election 1929: Oswestry
| Party | Candidate | Votes | % | ±% |
|---|---|---|---|---|
| Unionist | Bertie Leighton | 15,554 | 47.0 | −8.1 |
| Liberal | John Share Jones | 10,565 | 32.0 | +8.3 |
| Labour | H S Evans | 6,944 | 21.0 | −0.2 |
| Majority | | 4,989 | 15.0 | −16.4 |
| Turnout | | 33,053 | 78.8 | −0.1 |
| Unionist hold | | Swing | -8.2 | |

=== Elections in the 1930s ===
General election 1931: Oswestry
| Party | Candidate | Votes | % | ±% |
|---|---|---|---|---|
| Conservative | Bertie Leighton | 23,740 | 74.0 | +27.0 |
| Labour | William Elim Warder | 8,343 | 26.0 | +5.0 |
| Majority | | 15,397 | 48.0 | +33.0 |
| Turnout | | 32,083 | 74.7 | −4.1 |
| Conservative hold | | Swing | | |

General election 1935: Oswestry
| Party | Candidate | Votes | % | ±% |
|---|---|---|---|---|
| Conservative | Bertie Leighton | Unopposed | N/A | N/A |
| Conservative hold | | | | |

=== Elections in the 1940s ===
General Election 1939–40: Another General Election was required to take place before the end of 1940. The political parties had been making preparations for an election to take place from 1939 and by the end of this year, the following candidates had been selected;

- Conservative: Bertie Leighton
- Liberal:

General election 1945: Oswestry
| Party | Candidate | Votes | % | ±% |
|---|---|---|---|---|
| Conservative | Oliver Poole | 19,082 | 54.7 | N/A |
| Labour | Gilbert Boyd-Carpenter | 10,777 | 30.9 | New |
| Liberal | Leslie Corbet Burcher | 5,049 | 14.5 | New |
| Majority | | 8,305 | 23.8 | N/A |
| Turnout | | 34,908 | 71.7 | N/A |
| Conservative hold | | Swing | N/A | |

=== Elections in the 1950s ===
General election 1950: Oswestry
| Party | Candidate | Votes | % | ±% |
|---|---|---|---|---|
| Conservative | David Ormsby-Gore | 23,562 | 61.81 | |
| Labour | Arthur George Wait | 14,556 | 38.19 | |
| Majority | | 9,006 | 23.62 | |
| Turnout | | 38,118 | 78.27 | |
| Conservative hold | | Swing | | |

General election 1951: Oswestry
| Party | Candidate | Votes | % | ±% |
|---|---|---|---|---|
| Conservative | David Ormsby-Gore | 23,843 | 62.23 | |
| Labour | Arthur George Wait | 14,471 | 37.77 | |
| Majority | | 9,372 | 24.46 | |
| Turnout | | 38,314 | 76.89 | |
| Conservative hold | | Swing | | |

General election 1955: Oswestry
| Party | Candidate | Votes | % | ±% |
|---|---|---|---|---|
| Conservative | David Ormsby-Gore | 22,859 | 64.77 | |
| Labour | Mark E Boggin | 12,434 | 35.23 | |
| Majority | | 10,425 | 29.54 | |
| Turnout | | 35,293 | 70.17 | |
| Conservative hold | | Swing | | |

General election 1959: Oswestry
| Party | Candidate | Votes | % | ±% |
|---|---|---|---|---|
| Conservative | David Ormsby-Gore | 21,055 | 55.9 | −8.9 |
| Labour | Glyn Thomas | 10,531 | 28.0 | −7.2 |
| Liberal | David G. Rees | 6,068 | 16.1 | New |
| Majority | | 10,524 | 27.9 | −1.6 |
| Turnout | | 37,654 | 74.2 | +4.0 |
| Conservative hold | | Swing | | |

=== Elections in the 1960s ===
1961 Oswestry by-election
| Party | Candidate | Votes | % | ±% |
|---|---|---|---|---|
| Conservative | John Biffen | 12,428 | 40.8 | −15.1 |
| Liberal | John Buchanan | 8,647 | 28.4 | +12.3 |
| Labour | Brian Walden | 8,519 | 28.0 | 0.0 |
| Patriotic Front | John E. Dayton | 839 | 2.8 | New |
| Majority | | 3,781 | 12.4 | −15.5 |
| Turnout | | 30,433 | 60.8 | −13.4 |
| Conservative hold | | Swing | -13.7 | |

General election 1964: Oswestry
| Party | Candidate | Votes | % | ±% |
|---|---|---|---|---|
| Conservative | John Biffen | 18,154 | 47.4 | −8.5 |
| Labour | George J. Costley | 11,407 | 29.8 | +1.8 |
| Liberal | Thomas Rowland Crowther | 8,745 | 22.8 | +6.7 |
| Majority | | 6,747 | 17.6 | −10.3 |
| Turnout | | 38,709 | | |
| Conservative hold | | Swing | +2.4 | |

General election 1966: Oswestry
| Party | Candidate | Votes | % | ±% |
|---|---|---|---|---|
| Conservative | John Biffen | 17,727 | 48.24 | |
| Labour | George J. Costley | 13,011 | 35.41 | |
| Liberal | Thomas R. Crowther | 6,010 | 16.35 | |
| Majority | | 4,716 | 12.83 | |
| Turnout | | 36,748 | 73.35 | |
| Conservative hold | | Swing | | |

=== Elections in the 1970s ===
General election 1970: Oswestry
| Party | Candidate | Votes | % | ±% |
|---|---|---|---|---|
| Conservative | John Biffen | 20,361 | 50.7 | +2.5 |
| Labour | Neil Turner | 10,801 | 26.9 | −8.5 |
| Liberal | Edward Paul Cadbury | 8,963 | 22.3 | +6.0 |
| Majority | | 9,560 | 23.8 | +11.0 |
| Turnout | | 40,125 | 72.0 | −1.3 |
| Conservative hold | | Swing | +5.5 | |

General election February 1974: Oswestry
| Party | Candidate | Votes | % | ±% |
|---|---|---|---|---|
| Conservative | John Biffen | 20,438 | 46.93 | |
| Liberal | David J Evans | 13,428 | 30.83 | |
| Labour | J Bishton | 9,685 | 22.24 | |
| Majority | | 7,010 | 16.10 | |
| Turnout | | 43,551 | 77.91 | |
| Conservative hold | | Swing | | |

General election October 1974: Oswestry
| Party | Candidate | Votes | % | ±% |
|---|---|---|---|---|
| Conservative | John Biffen | 19,165 | 47.28 | |
| Labour | J Bishton | 10,751 | 26.52 | |
| Liberal | David J Evans | 10,623 | 26.20 | |
| Majority | | 8,414 | 20.76 | |
| Turnout | | 40,539 | 71.84 | |
| Conservative hold | | Swing | | |

General election 1979: Oswestry
| Party | Candidate | Votes | % | ±% |
|---|---|---|---|---|
| Conservative | John Biffen | 23,551 | 54.64 | |
| Labour | Peter Ernest Sandland-Nielsen | 10,150 | 23.55 | |
| Liberal | David J Evans | 9,405 | 21.82 | |
| Majority | | 13,401 | 31.09 | |
| Turnout | | 43,106 | 73.90 | |
| Conservative hold | | Swing | | |

== See also ==
- Parliamentary constituencies in Shropshire#Historical constituencies
- List of former United Kingdom Parliament constituencies
- Unreformed House of Commons
