= Bertie Leighton =

British Army officer and politician (1875–1952)

Major Bertie Edward Parker Leighton (26 November 1875 – 15 February 1952) was an English Conservative Party politician, British Army officer and landowner.

He was son of Stanley Leighton, who was himself a member of parliament and from whom he inherited the Sweeney Hall estate in 1901, and his wife Jessie Williams-Wynn. He was educated at Eton College and the Royal Military College, Sandhurst.

Leighton was commissioned a second lieutenant in the 1st (Royal) Dragoons on 25 March 1896, and was promoted to lieutenant on 12 May 1899. He served with them through the Second Boer War of 1899–1902, taking part in operations in Natal, Transvaal and the Orange River Colony, during which he was promoted to captain on 27 June 1901. Following the end of the war, Leighton left South Africa with other officers and men of the regiment on the SS Kildonan Castle, which arrived at Southampton in October 1902. He was also attached to the Shropshire Yeomanry when he served as its adjutant from 1908 to 1911. He was later promoted to major in 1914, and served in the First World War in Europe where he was severely wounded.

Leighton became a justice of the peace for Shropshire in 1908 and Deputy Lieutenant of the same county in 1916. He served as treasurer of the Royal Salop Infirmary at Shrewsbury in 1933.

He sat in the House of Commons from 1929 until retiring before the 1945 general election as the member of parliament (MP) for Oswestry in Shropshire.

He married in 1936 Margaret Evelyn, daughter of the Reverend Hugh Hanmer, of The Mount, Oswestry, but was childless when he died in 1952 aged 76.

Parliament of the United Kingdom
Preceded by William Bridgeman	Member of Parliament for Oswestry; 1929 – 1945	Succeeded by Oliver Poole
