= George Ormsby-Gore, 3rd Baron Harlech =

British peer (KCB), politician & honorary military colonel (1855-1938)

George Ralph Charles Ormsby-Gore 3rd Baron Harlech
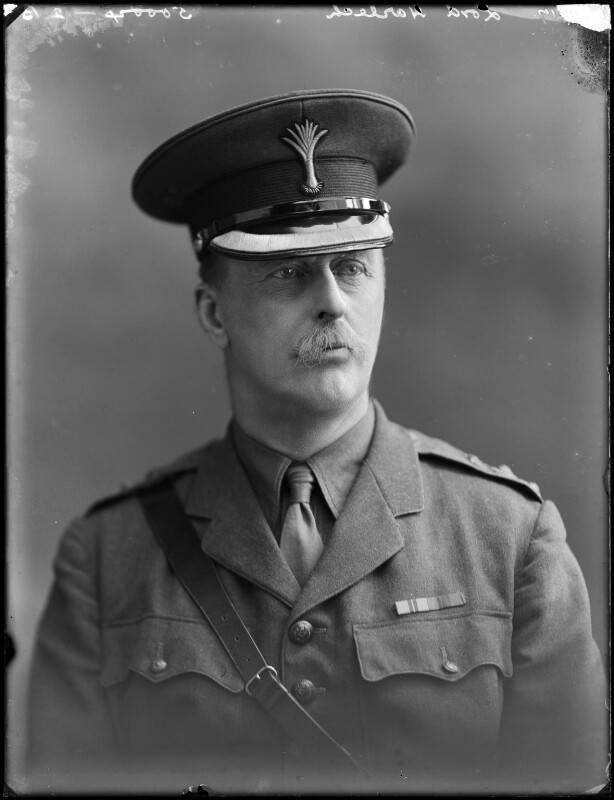
- Ormsby-Gore in 1917

Member of Parliament for Oswestry
- In office 1901–1904
- Preceded by: Stanley Leighton
- Succeeded by: Allan Heywood Bright

Personal details
- Born: 21 January 1855
- Died: 8 May 1938 (aged 83)
- Resting place: Selattyn, near Oswestry, Shropshire
- Party: Conservative
- Spouse: Lady Margaret Ethel Gordon (m. 1881)
- Children: 1
- Parents: William Richard Ormsby-Gore (father); Lady Emily Charlotte Seymour (mother)
- Relatives: William Ormsby-Gore (son)
- Education: Eton College
- Alma mater: Royal Military College, Sandhurst
- Military career
- Allegiance: United Kingdom
- Branch: British Army
- Service years: 1875-1918
- Rank: Colonel
- Units: Coldstream Guards; Shropshire Yeomanry; Welsh Guards
- Conflicts: World War I

George Ralph Charles Ormsby-Gore, 3rd Baron Harlech, KCB TD DL (21 January 1855 – 8 May 1938), was a British soldier and Conservative Member of Parliament.

== Background and education ==
Harlech was the son of William Richard Ormsby-Gore, 2nd Baron Harlech, and Lady Emily Charlotte Seymour, and was educated at Eton College and the Royal Military College, Sandhurst.

== Military career ==
He served in the regular army as a lieutenant in the Coldstream Guards from 1875 to 1883. He later served in the Shropshire Yeomanry, becoming its commanding officer as lieutenant-colonel from 1902 to 1907, and was honorary colonel from 1908. He commanded the Welsh Guards at home during the First World War in 1915. He was chairman of the Salop Territorial Army Association.

== Political career ==
He was elected to the House of Commons for Oswestry in a by-election in May 1901, a seat he held until 1904 when he succeeded his father as third Baron Harlech and entered the House of Lords.

=== Crown appointments ===
Lord Harlech was a justice of the peace for both County Leitrim and Shropshire and High Sheriff of Leitrim for 1885. He was appointed to be a deputy lieutenant of Merionethshire in 1896 and of Shropshire in 1897.

Harlech also served as Lord Lieutenant of Leitrim from 1904 to 1922 and as Lord Lieutenant of Merionethshire from 1927 to 1938, as well as Constable of Harlech Castle from 1927 until his death.

== Honours and decorations ==
- DL: Deputy lieutenant of Salop, and County Merioneth.
- TD: Recipient of the Territorial Decoration, 2 September 1910.
- CB: Companion of the Order of the Bath.
- GCB: Knight Grand Cross of the Order of the Bath – as a Companion (CB) in the 1923 Birthday Honours.
- KCB: Knight commander in the 1936 New Year Honours.

Harlech was also awarded the Knight of the Order of St John of Jerusalem From 1926 to 1938 he was served as Provincial Grand Master of Freemasonry in Shropshire and was a member of the Lodge of St. Oswald (No. 1124), which is now also known as the Harlech Lodge of Perfection.

=== Arms ===
Coat of arms of George Ormsby-Gore, 3rd Baron Harlech
Notes Coat of arms of Baron Harlech, of the Ormsby-Gore family Crest 1st, an heraldic tiger rampant argent; 2nd, a dexter arm embowed in armour proper, holding in the hand a man’s leg also in armour, couped at the thigh. Escutcheon Quarterly: 1st and 4th gules, a fesse between three cross-crosslets fitchee or, Gore; 2nd and 3rd gules, a bend between six cross-crosslets or, Ormsby. Supporters Dexter:an heraldic tiger argent, maned and tufted sable, ducally gorged or; sinister, a lion or. Motto Latin: (In Hoc Signo Vinces ), Under this sign thou shalt conquer.

== Personal life ==
Lord Harlech married Lady Margaret Ethel Gordon, daughter of Charles Gordon, 10th Marquess of Huntly, on 25 July 1881. They had one child :

- William George Arthur Ormsby-Gore, 4th Baron Harlech (born 11 April 1885, died 14 February 1964)

His family seats were Brogyntyn, Oswestry; Derrycarne, County Leitrim, Glyn, Merionethshire.

Harlech died in May 1938, aged 83, and was succeeded in the barony by his son. Lady Harlech died in 1950. The couple are buried in the parish churchyard of Selattyn near Oswestry. Their southern English home was Tetworth Hall at Ascot in Berkshire.

Parliament of the United Kingdom
Preceded by Stanley Leighton	Member of Parliament for Oswestry; 1901–1904	Succeeded by Allan Heywood Bright
Honorary titles
Preceded by The Lord Harlech	Lord Lieutenant of Leitrim; 1904–1922	Office abolished
Preceded by Arthur Williams	Lord Lieutenant of Merionethshire; 1927–1938	Succeeded by The Lord Harlech
Peerage of the United Kingdom
Preceded by William Richard Ormsby-Gore	Baron Harlech; 1904–1938	Succeeded by William George Arthur Ormsby-Gore
