= Stanley Leighton =

British politician

Leighton in 1895.

Stanley Leighton (1837 – 4 May 1901) was an English barrister, landowner, artist and Conservative politician. He is also known as an antiquarian and author.

== Life ==
Leighton was the younger son of Sir Baldwin Leighton, 7th Baronet, of Loton Park, and his wife Mary Parker. He was educated at Harrow School and Balliol College, Oxford. He then attended Inner Temple and was called to the bar on 18 November 1861, proceeding to the Oxford Circuit. In 1867 he travelled to the colonies with his friend and fellow-barrister, Rees Davies. His diaries record a trip to India and Ceylon in 1867-1868 and the pair visited Australia in 1868 where Leighton produced many original sketches. In 1869 his father passed on to him the Sweeney estate at Oswestry which had come to his mother through the Parker family. He became J.P. for Shropshire in 1869 and also Deputy Lieutenant. He was also a Captain of the 15th Shropshire Rifle Volunteers which he remained until 1888

Leighton owned brickworks at Sweeney, near Oswestry, which he leased to the Oswestry Coal & Brick Co. Ltd. before 1880, then to the Sweeney Brick Co. Ltd., and after 1885 it was leased to Kay & Hindle Ltd. as the Sweeney Brick & Terra-cotta Works. In 1875, he purchased Llwyd's Mansion, an impressive timber-framed building in the centre of Oswestry dating from 1604, which was then renovated and divided into shops.

In 1874 Leighton stood unsuccessfully for Bewdley but at a by-election in 1876 he was elected member of parliament for North Shropshire and held the seat until it was reorganised in 1885. He was then elected for Oswestry and held the seat until his death.

Leighton was an antiquary and active member of the Society for the Protection of Ancient Buildings which was founded by William Morris and Philip Webb in 1877, to oppose what they saw as the insensitive renovation of ancient buildings then occurring in Victorian England. In 1888 he was Honorary Commissioner for South Australia at the Paris Exhibition 1888, and he was author of Records of Oswestry. His Shropshire houses: past & present; illustrated from drawings (1901) was complete and in the printer's hands at the time of his death.

Leighton served as president of the Wenlock Olympian Games in 1885 and 1886 and in 1900 was elected treasurer of the Salop Infirmary in Shrewsbury.

He died of pneumonia at his London home aged 63, having hastened to vote in the Commons over the Coal Duty Bill. He was buried in St Oswald's parish churchyard at Oswestry.

Leighton married Jessie Marie Williams-Wynn, daughter of Herbert Bertie Watkin Williams-Wynn on 28 August 1873. Their son Bertie Edward Parker Leighton (1875–1952) was also MP for Oswestry (1929–1945) and inherited the Sweeney Estate.

Parliament of the United Kingdom
Preceded by John Ormsby-Gore; Viscount Newport	Member of Parliament for North Shropshire; 1876–1885; With: Viscount Newport	Constituency abolished see Ludlow, Newport, Oswestry and Wellington
New constituency see North Shropshire	Member of Parliament for Oswestry; 1885–1901	Succeeded by George Ormsby-Gore
