= Parliamentary constituencies in Shropshire =

UK constituencies

The ceremonial county of Shropshire (which comprises the unitary authorities of Shropshire Council and Telford and Wrekin), is divided into 5 parliamentary constituencies: 1 borough constituency and 4 county constituencies.

== Constituencies ==
Conservative † Liberal Democrat ¤ Labour ‡

Constituency (Note: BC denotes borough constituency, CC denotes county constituency.)	Electorate	Majority (Note: The majority is the number of votes the winning candidate receives more than their nearest rival.)	Member of Parliament	Nearest opposition	Map
North Shropshire CC	77,573	15,311	Helen Morgan ¤	Simon Baynes †	Map showing the location of the North Shropshire constituency in Shropshire under the boundaries created by the 2023 boundary review and first used at the 2024 general election.
Shrewsbury CC	76,599	11,355	Julia Buckley ‡	Daniel Kawczynski †	Map showing the location of the Shrewsbury constituency in Shropshire under the boundaries created by the 2023 boundary review and first used at the 2024 general election.
South Shropshire CC	76,723	1,624	Stuart Anderson †	Matthew Green ¤	Map showing the location of the South Shropshire constituency in Shropshire under the boundaries created by the 2023 boundary review and first used at the 2024 general election.
Telford BC	73,808	8,102	Shaun Davies ‡	Alan Adams (Reform UK)	Map showing the location of the Telford constituency in Shropshire under the boundaries created by the 2023 boundary review and first used at the 2024 general election.
The Wrekin CC	78,942	883	Mark Pritchard †	Roh Yakobi ‡	Map showing the location of The Wrekin constituency in Shropshire under the boundaries created by the 2023 boundary review and first used at the 2024 general election.

== Boundary changes ==
=== 2024 ===
See 2023 review of Westminster constituencies for further details.

Former name
1. Ludlow CC
2. North Shropshire CC
3. Shrewsbury and Atcham CC
4. Telford BC
5. The Wrekin CC
Boundaries 2010–2024

New parliamentary constituencies in Shropshire

Current name
1. North Shropshire CC
2. Shrewsbury CC
3. South Shropshire CC
4. Telford BC
5. The Wrekin CC
Boundaries 2024–present

For the 2023 review of Westminster constituencies, which redrew the constituency map ahead of the 2024 United Kingdom general election, the Boundary Commission for England opted to retain the current five constituencies in Shropshire, with minor boundary changes to reflect changes to ward boundaries and to bring constituencies within the statutory range. Shrewsbury and Atcham reverted to its original name of Shrewsbury, while Ludlow was renamed South Shropshire.

=== 2010 ===
Under the fifth periodic review of Westminster constituencies, the Boundary Commission for England decided to retain the 5 constituencies in Shropshire for the 2010 election, making only small changes to the boundary between Telford and The Wrekin to align with current local government wards.

Name
1. Ludlow CC
2. North Shropshire CC
3. Shrewsbury and Atcham CC
4. Telford BC
5. The Wrekin CC
Boundaries 1997–2010

Parliamentary constituencies in Shropshire

Boundaries 2010–2024

New parliamentary constituencies in Shropshire

== Results history ==
Primary data source: House of Commons research briefing – General election results from 1918 to 2019

=== 2024 ===
The number of votes cast for each political party who fielded candidates in constituencies comprising Shropshire in the 2024 general election were as follows:

Party	Votes	%	Change from 2019	Seats	Change from 2019
Labour	66,943	27.5%	▲1.6%	2	▲2
Conservative	65,156	26.8%	▼33.5%	2	▼3
Liberal Democrats	55,257	22.7%	▲12.3%	1	▲1
Reform UK	44,412	18.2%	new	0	0
Greens	10,680	4.4%	▲1.7%	0	0
Others	1,109	0.5%	▼0.2%	0	0
Total	243,557	100.0		5	

=== 2019 ===
The number of votes cast for each political party who fielded candidates in constituencies comprising Shropshire in the 2019 general election were as follows:

Party	Votes	%	Change from 2017	Seats	Change from 2017
Conservative	155,225	60.3%	▲4.7%	5	0
Labour	66,798	25.9%	▼9.3%	0	0
Liberal Democrats	26,827	10.4%	▲4.6%	0	0
Greens	6,955	2.7%	▲0.6%	0	0
Others	1,713	0.7%	▼0.6%	0	0
Total	257,518	100.0		5	

=== Percentage votes ===
Election year	1950	1951	1955	1959	1964	1966	1970	1974 (Feb)	1974 (Oct)	1979	1983	1987	1992	1997	2001	2005	2010	2015	2017	2019	2024
Conservative^{1}	54.7	57.3	59.3	55.6	47.9	49.3	52.4	43.1	43.0	49.6	49.0	48.2	46.3	37.2	39.1	41.8	46.8	48.3	55.6	60.3	26.8
Labour	41.2	42.7	40.7	36.2	34.1	42.7	36.0	31.1	33.2	29.1	21.3	25.4	30.7	39.7	38.2	30.8	21.6	24.4	35.2	25.9	27.5
Liberal Democrat^{2}	4.1	-	-	8.2	18.0	8.0	11.7	25.8	23.8	21.0	29.7	26.0	22.0	20.5	18.6	23.0	23.5	7.0	5.8	10.4	22.7
Green Party	-	-	-	-	-	-	-	-	-	-	-	*	*	*	*	*	0.8	4.0	2.1	2.7	4.4
UKIP	-	-	-	-	-	-	-	-	-	-	-	-	-	*	*	*	4.4	16.3	1.2	*	-
Reform UK	-	-	-	-	-	-	-	-	-	-	-	-	-	-	-	-	-	-	-	-	18.2
Other	-	-	-	-	-	-	-	-	-	0.2	0.1	0.3	1.0	2.7	4.1	4.4	3.0	-	0.1	0.7	0.5

^{1}Includes National Liberal Party up to 1966

^{2}1950–1979 – Liberal; 1983 & 1987 – SDP–Liberal Alliance

* Included in Other

=== Seats ===
Election year	1950	1951	1955	1959	1964	1966	1970	1974 (Feb)	1974 (Oct)	1979	1983	1987	1992	1997	2001	2005	2010	2015	2017	2019	2024
Conservative^{1}	3	3	4	4	4	3	4	3	3	4	4	3	3	2	1	4	4	5	5	5	2
Labour	1	1	0	0	0	1	0	1	1	0	0	1	1	3	3	1	1	0	0	0	2
Liberal Democrat^{2}	0	0	0	0	0	0	0	0	0	0	0	0	0	0	1	0	0	0	0	0	1
Total	4	4	4	4	4	4	4	4	4	4	4	4	4	5	5	5	5	5	5	5	5

^{1}Includes National Liberal Party up to 1966

^{2}1950–1979 – Liberal; 1983 & 1987 – SDP–Liberal Alliance

=== Maps ===
==== 1885–1910 ====
1885

1886

1892

1895

1900

1906

Jan 1910

Dec 1910

==== 1918–1945 ====
1918

1922

1923

1924

1929

1931

1935

1945

==== 1950–1979 ====
1950

1951

1955

1959

1964

1966

1970

Feb 1974

Oct 1974

1979

==== 1983–present ====
1983

1987

1992

1997

2001

2005

2010

2015

2017

2019

2024

== Historical constituencies ==
Timeline of parliamentary constituencies in the county, with historical (green) and extant (pink) constituencies.

Constituency	1290–1295	1295–1473	1473–1584	1584–1832	1832–1885	1885–1918	1918–1983	1983–1997	1997–present
Bishop's Castle				1584–1832					
Bridgnorth		1295–1885							
Ludlow			1473–present						
Newport						1885–1918			
North Shropshire					1832–1885			1983–present	
Oswestry						1885-1983			
Shrewsbury	1290–1983								
Shrewsbury and Atcham								1983–present	
Shropshire	1290–1832								
South Shropshire					1832-1885				
Telford									1997–present
Wellington						1885–1918			
(Much) Wenlock	1290–1885								
The Wrekin							1918–present		

== Historical representation by party ==
A cell marked → (with a different colour background to the preceding cell) indicates that the previous MP continued to sit under a new party name.

=== 1885 to 1918 ===
Conservative Liberal Liberal Unionist National Party

Constituency	1885	86	1886	1892	1895	1900	01	03	04	1906	08	Jan 1910	Dec 1910	12	13	17	18
Ludlow	More	→						Hunt						→		→	→
Newport	Bickersteth	→	Kenyon-Slaney								Stanier						
Oswestry	Leighton						Ormsby-Gore		Bright	Bridgeman							
Shrewsbury	Watson			Greene						Hill					Lloyd		
Wellington (Salop)	Brown	→								Henry							

=== 1918 to 1945 ===
Coalition Liberal (1918–22) / National Liberal (1922–23) Conservative Independent Conservative Labour Liberal

Constituency	1918	20	20	22	1922	23	1923	1924	1929	1931	1935	41
Ludlow	Stanier			I. Windsor-Clive		G. Windsor-Clive						
Oswestry	Bridgeman								Leighton			
Shrewsbury	Lloyd				Ryder		Sunlight	Ryder	Duckworth			
The Wrekin	Henry	Palmer	Townshend		Button		Nixon	Oakley	Picton-Turbervill	Baldwin-Webb		Colegate

=== 1945 to 1983 ===
Conservative Labour

Constituency	1945	1950	1951	1955	1959	60	61	1964	1966	1970	Feb 74	Oct 74	1979
Ludlow	Corbett		Holland-Martin			More							Cockeram
Oswestry	Poole	Ormsby-Gore					Biffen						
Shrewsbury	Langford-Holt												
The Wrekin	Thomas			Yates					Fowler	Trafford	Fowler		Hawksley

=== 1983 to present ===
Conservative Labour Liberal Democrats

Constituency	1983	1987	1992	1997	2001	01	2005	2010	2015	2017	2019	21	24	2024
Ludlow / South Shropshire (2024)	Cockeram	Gill			Green		Dunne							Anderson
North Shropshire	Biffen			Paterson								Morgan		
Shrewsbury and Atcham / Shrewsbury (2024)	Conway			Marsden		→	Kawczynski							Buckley
The Wrekin	Hawksley	Grocott		Bradley			Pritchard							
Telford				Grocott	Wright				Allan				→	Davies

== See also ==
- List of parliamentary constituencies in the West Midlands (region)
- List of United Kingdom Parliament constituencies
- Category:Members of the Parliament of the United Kingdom for constituencies in Shropshire
