= List of ships named City of Benares =

Five ships have been named City of Benares, after the former name of Varanasi, a city on the banks of the Ganges in Uttar Pradesh, India.

- City of Benares (1853), a three-masted sailing ship of 751 net register tons. Burnt-out at Calcutta, 28 January 1865
- City of Benares (1865), a sailing ship of 1,182 tons. 1881 sold and renamed Ruthin, rigged as barque. Renamed Laugen, 1900. Sank in the Baltic Sea, 10 February 1911.
- City of Benares (1882), a full-rigged sailing ship of 1,652 gross register tons. Wrecked at Westkapelle, Walcheren on 1 October 1911
- SS City of Benares (1902), a 6,984-gross register ton liner of the Ellerman Line; 1914–1918 troopship, scrapped February 1933 (A Titanic survivor, Ruth Becker, sailed aboard her).
- SS City of Benares (1936), an 11,081-gross register ton liner of the Ellerman City Line. U-48 torpedoed and sank her on 17 September 1940 while City of Benares was carrying 90 child evacuees. 258 people died including 81 children.

== See also ==
- SS Benares (1858), a P&O steamship. 1,900 tons, 400 horsepower. On Britain to Australia route in 1859. N. J. Skottowe, Esq., Commander. Wrecked on 23 May 1868 in the South China Sea.
