= Edith Picton-Turbervill =

English social reformer, writer and Labour Party politician

Edith Picton-Turbervill OBE
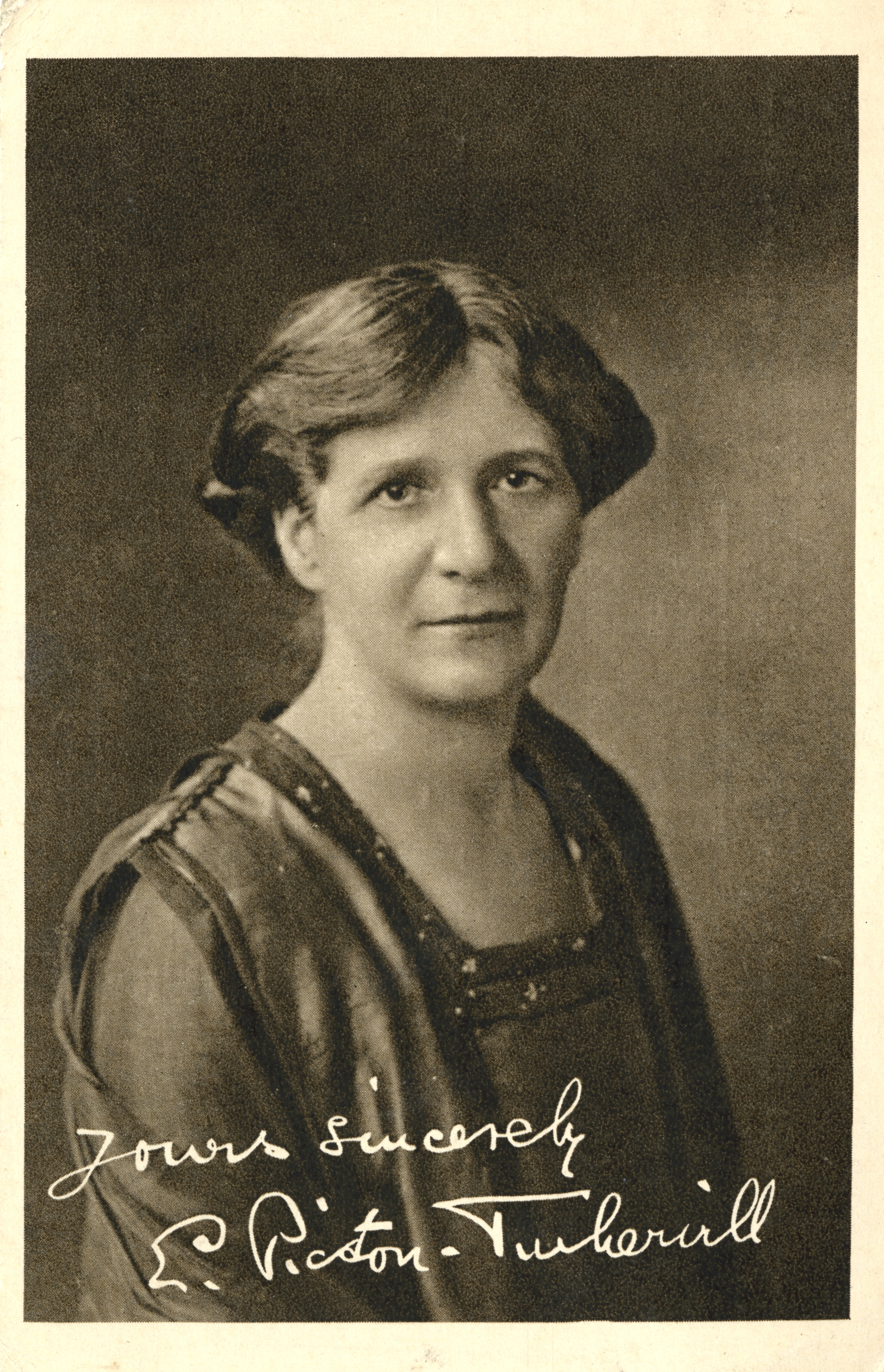
- Edith Picton-Turbervill in 1922

Member of Parliament for The Wrekin
- In office 30 May 1929 – 7 October 1931
- Prime Minister: Stanley Baldwin
- Preceded by: Thomas Oakley
- Succeeded by: James Baldwin-Webb

Personal details
- Born: 13 June 1872 Fownhope, Herefordshire, England
- Died: 31 August 1960 (aged 88) Cheltenham, England
- Party: Labour
- Occupation: Writer, social reformer and suffragist.

Edith Picton-Turbervill OBE (13 June 1872 – 31 August 1960) was an English social reformer, writer and Labour Party politician. From 1929 to 1931, she served as the Member of Parliament for The Wrekin in Shropshire.

== Early life ==
Edith was born at Lower House, Fownhope, Herefordshire, on 13 June 1872, one of the twin daughters (her sister was named Beatrice) of John Picton Warlow, then a captain in the Madras Staff Corps, and his wife Eleanor Temple, daughter of Sir Grenville Temple, 9th Baronet (self-styled), of Stowe. She changed her surname from Warlow to Picton-Turbervill at the same time as her father, when in 1892 he inherited the Turbervill estate of Ewenny Priory in Glamorgan. The estate was over 3,000 acres and her father was a mine royalty owner and a Conservative; he was a JP and a member of the Penybont Rural District Council. Edith was educated at the Royal School, Bath. Both her family environment and her school encouraged her in the belief that life was essentially something active, preferably on the behalf of others; she was also deeply religious.

== Missionary work with the YWCA ==
It was social and philanthropic work which drew her to the labour movement, leading her to conclude that 'fundamental changes in law were necessary to obtain better conditions of life for the people'. She grew up in a family which was aristocratically connected, although not particularly affluent until she was grown up.

Her first experience of social work was among navvies working on the building of the Vale of Glamorgan Railway, near her home. They were living in squalid conditions, isolated from the local community, and Edith attempted their moral improvement through religion and the provision of a reading room. At this time her interests were mainly in evangelical work, and she attended a training school for missionaries in London as a preparation for missionary work in the East. Part of the course consisted of slum visiting, which brought her into contact with the slums of Shoreditch and the evils of sweated labour.

As a young woman she had met in America the Hon. Emily Kinnaird, of the Young Women's Christian Association (YWCA), and it was through her that Edith first developed an interest in that organisation. For a time Kinnaird and Picton-Tubervill shared a flat in London. In 1900 she went to India to work for the YWCA, mainly among Anglo-Indians and Indian women students, until ill health compelled her to return home in 1906. She went back to India after her illness and became travelling secretary of the YWCA Student's department in Southern India, finally leaving in 1908 after a bad case of malaria. She never lost her interest in India, and later was active in Indian debates during her two years in the House of Commons. On returning home she became Head of the Foreign Department from 1909.

At this time she was also involved in the campaign for the women's suffrage, but on the suffragist side, regarding Millicent Fawcett as her leader rather than Sylvia Pankhurst, for whom however, she had a high regard. During the First World War she was involved in YWCA work to provide hostels and canteens for the women munition workers and for members of the Women's Army Auxiliary Corps in France. She received the Order of the British Empire (O.B.E.) for this work in 1918. She was, for a time, director of appeal, Munition Workers' Welfare Committee, for the YWCA, and was national vice-president from 1914 to 1920 and from 1922 to 1928.

== Campaigning for women to be priests ==
One of her lifelong wishes was that women should be allowed to take orders and enter the Church of England. Soon after the end of the First World War she became the first woman to preach a service at a statutory service in the Church of England, at North Somercotes in Lincolnshire. She was also one of a number of women who preached at St Botolph's Church, Bishopsgate, at the invitation of the rector, G. W. Hudson Shaw.

She held the Bishop of London's Inter-Diocesan Diploma for evangelical work; and all her life the place of women in the Church remained a central concern. She wrote books and articles on the subject, always campaigning for women to take up an equal place in the Church hierarchy.

== Labour Party ==
It was during the war years that she seems to have made her first contact with people from the Labour Party, and amongst them; George Lansbury and Margaret Bondfield. Bondfield seems to have especially influenced her, and she was greatly impressed by Arthur Henderson's The Aims of Labour (1918).

She joined the Labour Party in 1919, and became a parliamentary candidate for Islington North at the 1922 general election. Maude Royden and Isabella Ford were among those who gave her active support in the campaign, and although she had little hope of winning the seat, she did increase the Labour Party's share of the vote.

At the 1923 general election, she did not stand herself, but worked in Port Talbot for Ramsay MacDonald, with whom she remained on friendly terms until his death. However, she was critical of his actions in her autobiography.

Picton-Turbervill was the unsuccessful Labour candidate for Stroud in Gloucestershire in 1924 and had some sharp comments on party Prime Minister MacDonald's silence on the Zinoviev letter, which turned out to be a forgery. She noted that MacDonald's lack of comment had "a devastating effect" upon Labour candidates at the election. In February 1925 she was again selected as the Stroud Labour candidate but she resigned in June 1925 owing to dissention in the local party, following which Tom Langham, Party President along with two vice presidents resigned.

In 1925, she was selected as a Labour candidate for a marginal seat, The Wrekin, in Shropshire – like Stroud, a largely rural constituency with a mining community of about four thousand; and she became a close friend of the local miners' agent William (Bill) Latham – "A splendid old man, he was a strong chapel man and his speeches full of Old Testament phraseology and references".

== Life in Parliament ==
Although an Anglican, she was frequently asked to preach in the local chapels of the Wrekin area, and at the 1929 general election she won the seat by nearly 3,000 votes. When the results were announced "some in the vast crowd, sang the doxology 'Praise God from whom all blessings flow' – this was caught up by a large number and swelled into a loud chorus".

In 1929, there were fourteen women in the new House of Commons with just over 600 men; and the account of the 1929–31 Parliament in her autobiography is worth reading. She was always concerned with the inferior status of women in society, and always supported reforming measures and successfully introduced the Sentence of Death (Expectant Mothers) Bill to prevent the passing of the death sentence on pregnant women. In her handling of this, she showed her essential humanity and sensitivity. Because of her knowledge of canon law, she was nominated by the Government – the first woman to be nominated – to the Ecclesiastical Committee of Parliament (July 1929).

In her politics, she was consistently a moderate and an admirer of MacDonald, but in the crisis of 1931, after a period of hesitation – she abstained from voting on the first vote of confidence asked for by the National Government – she decided to remain with the Labour Party. Henderson and William Graham, especially the latter, were mainly responsible for her decision.

Picton-Turbervill was an enthusiastic advocate for women in the police, organising a number of Parliamentary discussions on the issue. Speaking in July 1931, she argued that the "use of trained policewomen creates a better social order in our cities", and advocated for more women to be employed by the police.

At the 1931 general election, she lost her seat to James Baldwin-Webb of the Conservatives. Edith had fully expected this, and in her own account of these days emphasised the enormous influence of the radio broadcasts of MacDonald and Philip Snowden in winning support for the National Government. As she wrote later: "The panic, however, that had been created with regard to money was so great that I verily believe if a chimpanzee had stood in that election for the National Government he would in some circumstances have been returned to Parliament."

== Her travels and work after Parliament ==
She had travelled widely all her life, and after losing her seat in Parliament, she travelled to Russia in 1932 (which did not impress her) and Kenya in 1933. In 1935, she visited Turkey as head of the British delegation to the International Congress of Women Citizens, and as such met President Mustafa Kemal Atatürk. She visited Copenhagen in the same capacity in 1939. In 1935, she was a member of the Next Five Years Group and in 1936 was asked to join a Government Commission to Hong Kong and Malaya to inquire into the mui tsai question. This was a subject on which she had spoken many times while in Parliament. Under this system, young girls were transferred from their birth parents to another household in return for money, to become domestic servants. It was obviously open to abuse, and was in fact, illegal but still widespread.

An attempt had been made to register and inspect existing mui tsais in 1929, but there was still a good deal of disquiet on the subject. Her investigations led Edith Picton-Turbervill to write a Minority Report. The two other commissioners, Sir Wilfred Woods and C. A. Willis, retired members of the Ceylon and Sudan Civil Services respectively, thought that the existing legislation simply needed to be more actively enforced. They thought it politically unwise to do as Edith suggested in her report – to extend the system of registration and inspection to all transferred children, whether they were called mui tsais or whatever. The Colonial Office published both reports in 1937, and in 1939 the Governments of Hong Kong and Malaya both accepted the principle of the Minority Report.

== Later life ==
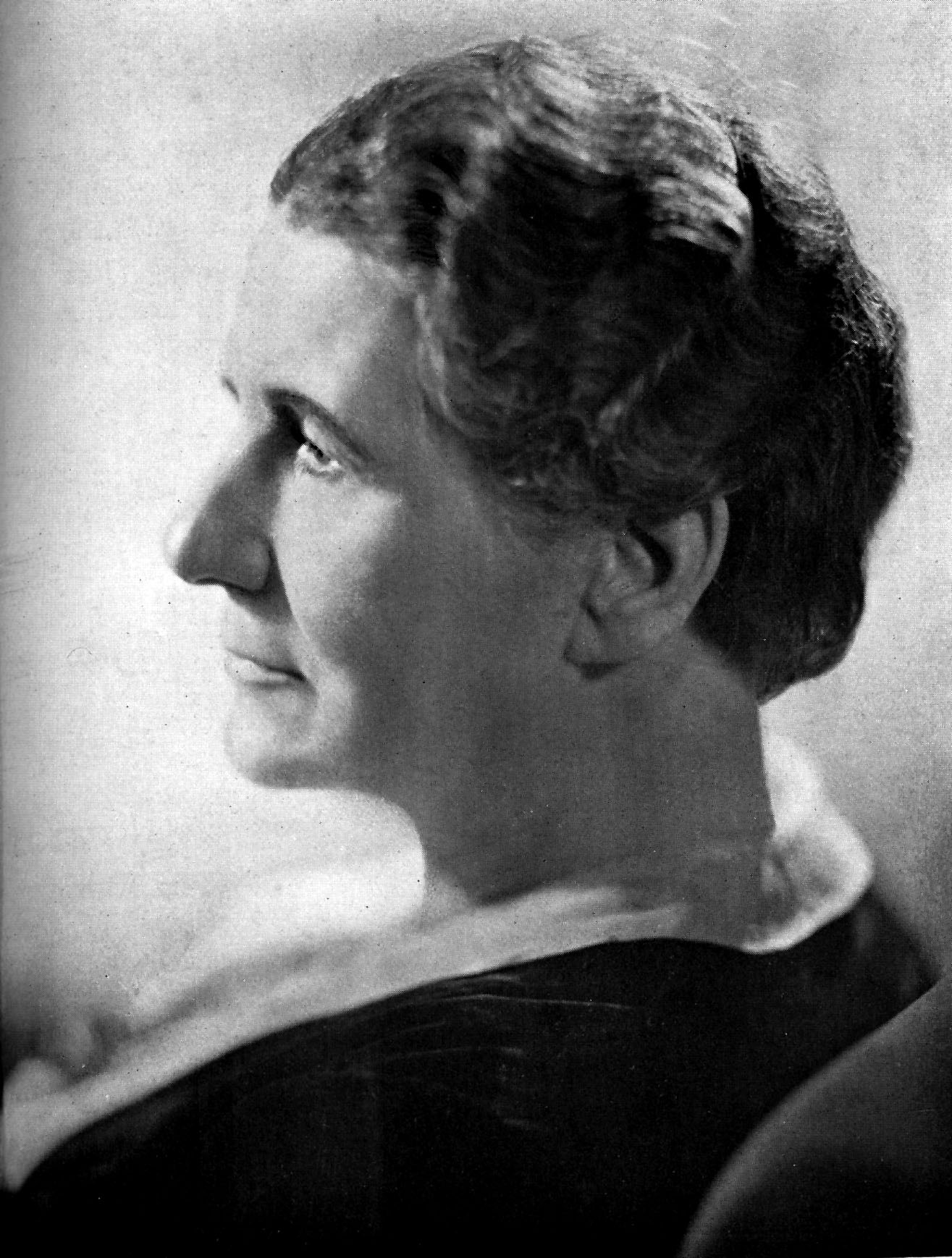
Picton-Turberville portrait from her autobiography (1939)

During the Second World War, Edith Picton-Turbervill worked for the Ministry of Information from 1941 to 1943. In 1944, she was President of the National Council of Women Citizens. From 1940, she lived in the Cheltenham area, continued to write, lecture and support the many causes in which she had worked, and also appeared on radio and television. She died on 31 August 1960 at Barnwood House Hospital, Gloucester, aged 88, and left an estate of £25,555.

Edith was an impressive figure physically, tall and strong-featured. Her speeches in Parliament were forthright, and based upon strongly held beliefs and were well argued. She had a wide circle of mostly female friends, including left-wing Labourites. Coming as she did from an old and privileged family, her socialist views were in sharp contrast and at odds with many family members, their friends and neighbours. In October 1977 the historian, Brian Harrison, interviewed her nephew, Wilfred Picton-Turbervill, as part of the Suffrage Interviews project, titled Oral evidence on the suffragette and suffragist movements: the Brian Harrison interviews. He reported that Picton-Turbervill's twin was an 'arch Conservative', and that the family had not approved of her becoming a Labour MP. Edith went against conformity, never married and without that responsibility had a very full and active public life, which she exploited to the full in her campaign to improve the status of women.

== Books and other writing ==
- The Coming Order in the Church of Christ, 19th century and after 80, nos. 475 477 (1916) 521–30, 1000–7 (with B.H. Streeter), Woman and the Church (1917)
- The Liturgy of the Church of England, Cont.Rev.113 (Jan 1918) 76-9
- Christ and Woman's Power with an introduction by Lady Frances Balfour (1919)
- Musings of a Lay-woman on the life of the Churches (1919) Christ and International Life (1921)
- The Coming Order in the Church of Christ, women in the Church (1923) 11pp.
- New Turkey's Dictator, Sat.Rev.159, 29 June 1935, 811
- Commission on Mui Tsai in Hong Kong and Malaya
- Report (Jan 1937) Colonial No. 125 non-parl., Minority Report on pp. 124–49
- ‘Childhood in Brighton and Bruges', in Myself when Young, Countess of Oxford and Asquith (1938) 313-60
- Life is good: an autobiography (1939)
- In the Land of my Fathers (Cardiff, 1946)
- Should Women be Priests and Ministers? (repr. From B.H.Streeter and E. Picton-Turbervill, Women and the Church (1917) [1953] 52 pp.
- Preface to A.B. Temple, The Story of Algar Temple and the Indian Mutiny (Cardiff, 1957 ?)

Parliament of the United Kingdom
Preceded by Thomas Oakley	Member of Parliament for The Wrekin; 1929–1931	Succeeded by James Baldwin-Webb
