= Capler Camp =

Iron Age hill fort in Herefordshire, England

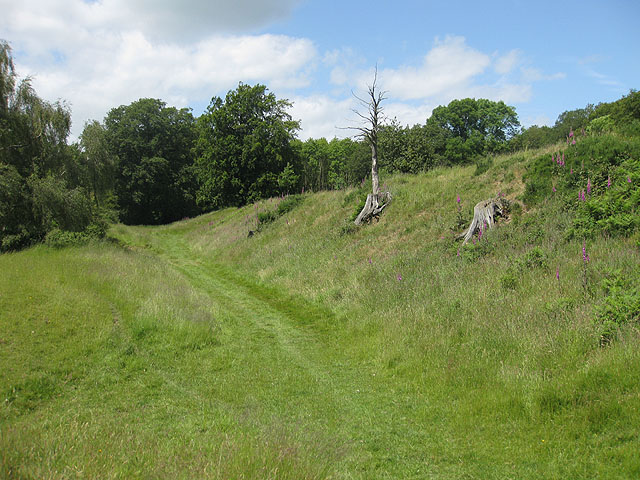
- Earthworks at Capler Camp.

- Location within Herefordshire
- 51°59′34″N 2°35′20″W
- Type: Hillfort
- Location: near Brockhampton, Herefordshire
- OS grid reference: SO 59244 32945

Scheduled monument
- Designated: 26 November 1928
- Reference no.: 1001759

Capler Camp is an Iron Age hill fort located 2.5 kilometres (1.6 mi) south of Fownhope, Herefordshire, England.

The Camp is on a hill top above the River Wye. It has a double layer of ditches enclosing 10 acres (4.0 ha). The Wye Valley Walk goes through this land.

Capler was known as Capelore in the Domesday Book. This name combined caple, "look-out place" with ofer, "flat-topped ridge".

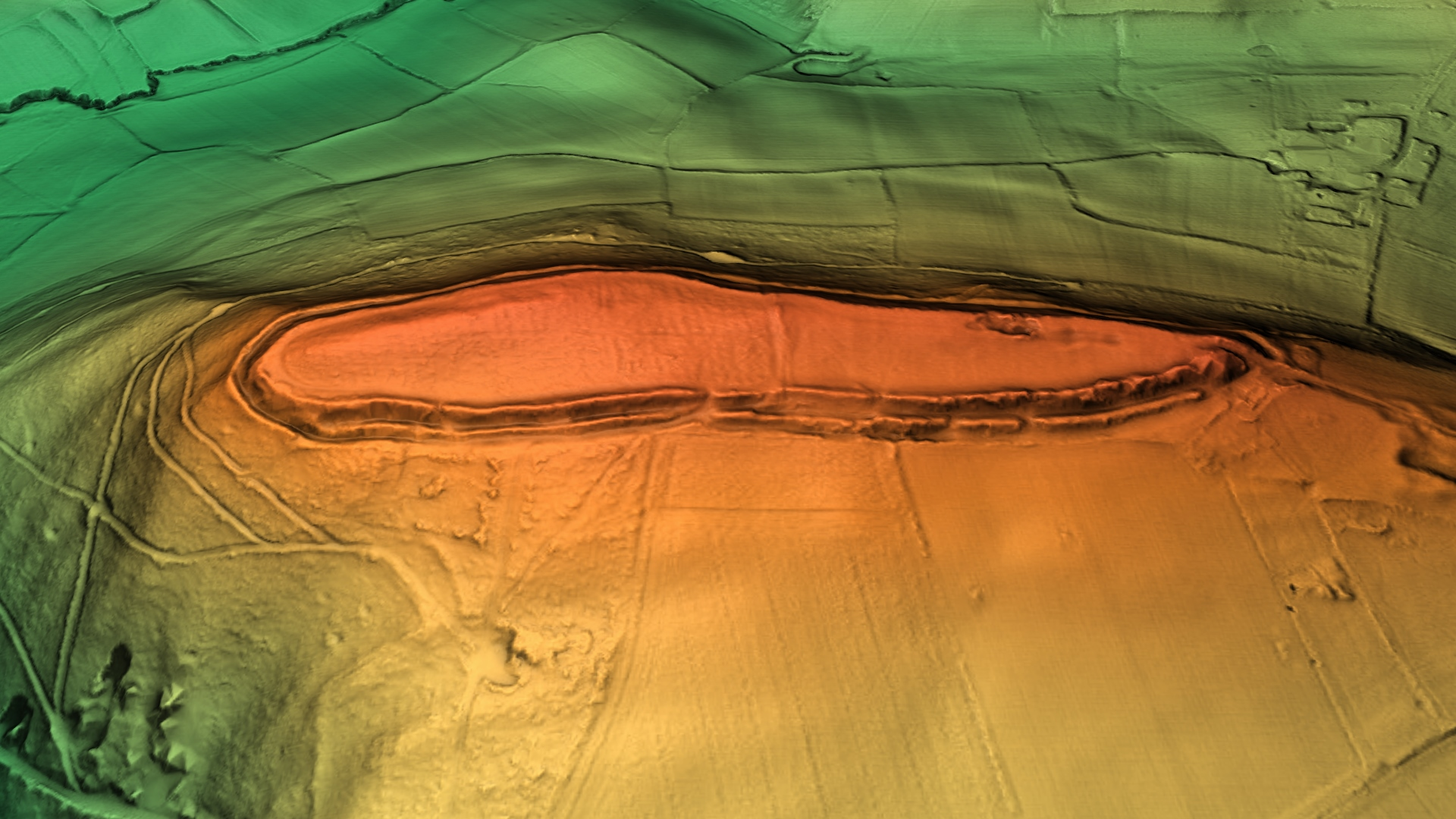
3D view of the digital terrain model
