= Henry Nixon (politician) =

British steelworker, trade unionist and politician

Member of Parliament for The Wrekin
- In office 6 December 1923 – 9 October 1924
- Preceded by: Howard Button
- Succeeded by: Thomas Oakley

Personal details
- Born: 1874
- Died: 15 March 1939 (aged 64-65)
- Party: Labour

Henry Nixon (1874 – 15 March 1939) was a British steelworker, trade unionist and politician. He was General President of the National Union of Blastfurnacemen, Cokeworkers, Ironstone Miners, and Kindred Trades and served briefly in Parliament representing the Labour Party.

== Working life ==
Nixon was born in Middlesbrough, the son of William Nixon. He left school when young to work in the blast furnaces of the local iron and steel industry, staying in the same industry after moving to Scunthorpe. He joined the Blastfurnacemen and Coke Oven Workers Union, and became the East Midlands Secretary of the union. His involvement in politics began when he was elected to Eston Urban District Council, on which he served for three years. In 1896 he married Naomi Would, of Coningsby in Lincolnshire.

== Lincolnshire politics ==
Nixon was elected to Scunthorpe Urban District Council on which he served for five years. He was also elected to Lindsey County Council for three years. Nixon was Vice-Chairman of Scunthorpe and District War Memorial Hospital. He also advanced in his union, being a permanent union agent (after 30 years working at the blast furnaces), and was also elected as President of the National Federation - a post in which he served for ten years. In November 1921 he was named by the government as a member of the Advisory Committee for the Metalliferous Mining Industry, representing his union, being reappointed in January 1924 when the committee was reconstituted. At the 1922 general election, Nixon was the Labour Party candidate for the Newark division of Nottinghamshire; he polled 8,378 votes in a straight fight with the Conservatives, who won with 15,423 votes.

== 1923 election ==
At the general election in December 1923, Nixon was adopted as Labour Party candidate for The Wrekin division of Shropshire, which included Ironbridge and Coalbrookdale, towns known for their pioneering role in the Iron industry. The constituency was considered winnable. The sitting MP, Conservative Howard Button, was a supporter of free trade and had decided to stand down when Prime Minister Stanley Baldwin called the election on a policy of introducing protective tariffs, and the new Conservative candidate was a colliery owner. The Liberal Party initially considered bringing forward a candidate, which prompted Labour to threaten to stand in neighbouring Shrewsbury where the Liberals had hopes, but eventually both seats were straight fights. On election day Nixon won The Wrekin by 1,383 votes (and the Liberal candidate also won Shrewsbury). He was the first Labour MP to be elected from Shropshire.

== Parliament ==
Nixon's Parliamentary contributions were not extensive, consisting mostly of questions concerning his constituency; he made his only brief speech on 10 July 1924, complaining of inequity in the compensation paid to victims of First World War air raids. In early May, along with a majority of Labour MPs but on a free vote, he voted against the Proportional Representation Bill.

== Later life ==
When the Labour government was defeated in October 1924 and dissolved Parliament, Nixon found himself opposed at the general election by a working-class Conservative candidate. Despite Labour being thought to have a solid base, Nixon lost the seat by 2,878 votes. He returned to his union work, and attended the annual meeting of the British section of the International Metal Workers Federation at York in July 1925. Nixon was chosen to fight Gloucester at the 1929 general election, hoping that the Liberals would succeed in attracting the votes of people who had voted Conservative at the previous election so that Labour would win the seat. However Nixon was defeated by 493 votes. When the Metalliferous Mines committee was divided in two, Nixon was named to the iron ore sub-committee in October 1930.

Parliament of the United Kingdom
Preceded by Howard Button	Member of Parliament for The Wrekin; 1923 – 1924	Succeeded by Thomas Oakley
Trade union offices
Preceded by New position	General President of the National Union of Blastfurnacemen; 1922 – 1939	Succeeded by Ambrose Callighan
