= The Wrekin (constituency) =

Parliamentary constituency in the United Kingdom, 1918 onwards

Coordinates: 52.755°N 2.465°W

- County constituency for the House of Commons
- Boundaries since 2024
- Boundary of The Wrekin in West Midlands region
- County: Shropshire
- Electorate: 66,111 (December 2010)
- Major settlements: Albrighton, Cosford, Newport, Shifnal, Wellington

Current constituency
- Created: 1918
- Member of Parliament: Mark Pritchard (Conservative)
- Seats: One
- Created from: Wellington, Newport and Ludlow

The Wrekin is a constituency (Note: A county constituency (for the purposes of election expenses and type of returning officer)) in the House of Commons of the British Parliament, located in the county of Shropshire in the West Midlands of England. It has existed continuously since its creation by the Representation of the People Act 1918, and is named after a prominent landmark hill in the area, The Wrekin. It has been represented by the Labour and Conservative parties since the 1920s, a post held since 2005 by Conservative MP Mark Pritchard. (Note: As with all British constituencies, it elects one Member of Parliament (MP) by the first past the post system of election at least every five years.)

== Constituency profile ==
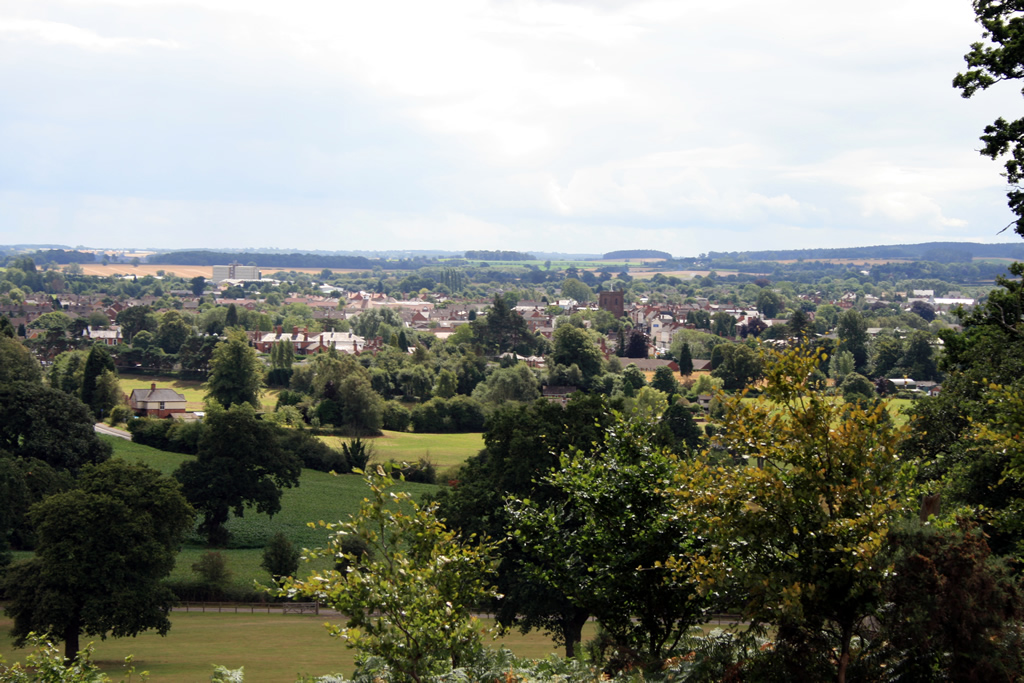
Newport

The Wrekin is a constituency in Shropshire in the West Midlands region of England. Settlements in the constituency include the towns of Newport and Shifnal, the village of Albrighton and the Telford suburbs of Wellington, Hadley, Donnington and Muxton. The constituency is named after The Wrekin, a prominent hill to the south of Wellington.

The Wrekin covers the northern suburbs of Telford, where most of the constituency's population lives, and a large rural area to the north and east with many small villages. Wellington is a historic market town that was absorbed by the development of Telford during the 1970s. Unlike Donnington, Muxton and the rest of Telford, Wellington does not have a history of coal mining. Newport and Shifnal are small market towns with well-preserved historic architecture. The constituency has average levels of wealth; Newport and Albrighton are mostly affluent however there is some deprivation in the Telford suburbs. House prices across The Wrekin are generally similar to the rest of the West Midlands but lower than the UK average.

Residents of The Wrekin have a similar age profile to the rest of the country. They have average levels of income, homeownership, child poverty and education. A high proportion of residents work in the agriculture, retail and health sectors, and the percentage claiming unemployment benefits is low. White people made up 89% of the population at the 2021 census.

At the local council level, the rural villages are represented by Conservatives, Shifnal by Reform UK, Newport mostly by Liberal Democrats and Wellington by a mixture of Liberal Democrats and Labour Party councillors. An estimated 59% of voters in The Wrekin supported leaving the European Union in the 2016 referendum, higher than the UK-wide figure of 52%.

== Boundaries and boundary changes ==
1918–1950: The Borough of Wenlock, the Urban Districts of Dawley, Newport, Oakengates, and Wellington, and the Rural Districts of Newport, Shifnal, and Wellington.

When originally constituted, the constituency, with a population of 71,352, was the largest division of Shropshire created in the 1918 boundary changes.

1950–1983: The Urban Districts of Dawley, Newport, Oakengates, and Wellington, and the Rural Districts of Shifnal and Wellington.

1983–1997: The District of The Wrekin wards of Arleston, Brookside, college, Cuckoo Oak, Dawley Magna, Donnington, Donnington Wood, Dothill, Ercall, Hadley, Haygate, Hollinswood/Randlay, Ironbridge (The Gorge), Ketley, Ketley Bank, Langley, Lawley, Leegomery, Lilleshall, Madeley, Malinslee, Park, Priorslee, Stirchley, Wombridge, Woodside, Wrockwardine, and Wrockwardine Wood.

In the Third Periodical Review of the Boundary Commission, which took effect for the 1983 general election, the constituency was redefined after major local government changes. This redefinition resulted in approximately one quarter of the electorate being removed to North Shropshire (Newport) and Ludlow (Shifnal).

1997–2010: The District of The Wrekin wards of Arleston, Church Aston, college, Donnington, Donnington Wood, Dothill and Park, Edgmond, Ercall, Ercall Magna, Hadley, Haygate, Ketley, Leegomery, Lilleshall, Newport East, Newport North, Newport West, and Wrockwardine, and the District of Bridgnorth wards of Albrighton, Idsall, Manor, and Sheriffhales.

Parliament approved major boundary changes which took effect at the 1997 general election, which created a new constituency containing and named after the town of Telford, before which Telford had been one of the largest elements of The Wrekin. The new Telford constituency took 62.9% of the electorate of The Wrekin leaving the remaining 37.1% to constitute a revised constituency of The Wrekin that incorporated areas previously within North Shropshire and Ludlow (mainly comprising areas which had previously been in the constituency prior to 1983).

2010–2024: The Borough of Telford and Wrekin wards of Apley Castle, Arleston, Church Aston and Lilleshall, college, Donnington, Dothill, Edgmond, Ercall, Ercall Magna, Hadley and Leegomery, Haygate, Muxton, Newport East, Newport North, Newport South, Newport West, Park, Shawbirch, and Wrockwardine, and the District of Bridgnorth wards of Albrighton South, Donington and Albrighton North, Shifnal Idsall, Shifnal Manor, and Shifnal Rural.

Boundary changes to realign the constituency boundaries to fit with the borough's most recent ward revisions resulted in the removal of Ketley to the constituency of Telford for the 2010 general election.

2024–present: Further to the 2023 Periodic Review of Westminster constituencies (based on local authority wards in place on 1 December 2020) and taking into account a further local government boundary review in the Borough of Telford and Wrekin which came into effect in May 2023, the constituency now comprises the following from the 2024 general election:

- The County of Shropshire electoral divisions of: Albrighton; Cheswardine; Hodnet; Shifnal North; Shifnal South and Cosford.
- The Borough of Telford and Wrekin wards of: Admaston & Bratton; Apley Castle; Arleston & College; Church Aston & Lilleshall; Donnington (nearly all); Edgmond; Ercall; Ercall Magna; Hadley & Leegomery; Haygate & Park; Lawley (small part); Muxton; Newport East; Newport North; Newport South; Newport West; Shawbirch & Dothill; Wrockwardine.

The electoral divisions of Hodnet and Cheswardine were added from the North Shropshire constituency and there was a small adjustment in the Telford and Wrekin Borough.

In its initial proposals, the boundary commission put forward the new name for the constituency of "Wellington and Newport"; this met with opposition locally and was dropped in the revised proposals.

The area almost encircles Telford, a 'New Town', encompassing much of the rural parts of the Telford and Wrekin borough, in which most of the constituency is. Its major settlements include: Wellington, Newport and Shifnal, as well as the suburban northern reaches of Telford (including Donnington). A small but significant area relates to the former Bridgnorth local government district (now part of the unitary Shropshire) and contains RAF Cosford and a number of commuter villages along the M54 motorway: the civil parishes of Sheriffhales, Shifnal, Tong, Boscobel, Albrighton, Donington and Boningale make up the non-Telford and The Wrekin-administered portion.

== History ==
Political history

The seat saw a first winning candidate from the Labour Party relatively early in its history, in 1923. The seat alternated between the two largest modern parties eight times between 1923 and 1979.

In more recent history, reflecting the growing population of Telford and the rich iron smelting, railway and mining industries as major historic employers in the area, the seat was more Labour-leaning than the national average but still marginal, being represented by a Conservative for the first eight years of the Thatcher ministry and then (from 1987) returning a Labour member, who was moved to a new Telford seat in 1997, and another Labour member until 2005, followed by the present Conservative who was elected that year. The Conservative majority at the 2024 election was 883 votes.

Most prominent members in Parliament

Gerald Fowler (Labour) reached the frontbenches of government as the Minister for Education and Science from 1969 to 1970, again in 1974 and 1976 and as Minister for the Privy Council Office from 1974 to 1976.

Anthony Trafford (Conservative) went on after serving as MP to serve as a health minister, from the House of Lords in 1989.

Bruce Grocott (Labour) went on, after serving as MP for the newly created neighbouring seat from 1997 to 2001, to serve as the Government's Chief Whip in the House of Lords for six years.

== Members of Parliament ==
Year	Member	Whip	Notes
1918	Sir Charles Henry	Coalition Liberal	MP for Wellington to 1918
Feb 1920	Charles Palmer	Independent Unionist	
1920	Charles Palmer	Independent Parliamentary Group	
Nov 1920	Sir Charles Townshend	Independent Parliamentary Group	
1922	Howard Stransom Button	Unionist	
1923	Henry Nixon	Labour	
1924	Thomas Oakley	Unionist	
1929	Edith Picton-Turbervill	Labour	
1931	James Baldwin-Webb	Conservative	
1941	Arthur Colegate	Conservative	MP for Burton 1950–55
1945	Ivor Owen Thomas	Labour	
1955	William Yates	Conservative	MP for Holt in the Australian House of Representatives 1975–80
1966	Gerald Fowler	Labour	
1970	Anthony Trafford	Conservative	
1974	Gerald Fowler	Labour	
1979	Warren Hawksley	Conservative	MP for Halesowen and Stourbridge 1992–97
1987	Bruce Grocott	Labour	MP for Telford 1997–2001
1997	Peter Bradley	Labour	
2005	Mark Pritchard	Conservative	

== Elections ==
=== Elections in the 2020s ===
General election 2024: The Wrekin
Party	Candidate	Votes	%	±%
Conservative	Mark Pritchard	16,320	32.6	−32.1
Labour	Roh Yakobi	15,437	30.9	+6.6
Reform	Richard Leppington	9,920	19.8	New
Liberal Democrats	Anthony Lowe	4,757	9.5	+1.5
Green	Patrick McCarthy	3,028	6.1	+3.2
Independent	Chris Shipley	558	1.1	New
Majority		883	1.8	−36.5
Turnout		50,020	63.4	−5.5
Registered electors		78,942		
Conservative hold		Swing	−19.4	

=== Elections in the 2010s ===
General election 2019: The Wrekin
Party	Candidate	Votes	%	±%
Conservative	Mark Pritchard	31,029	63.5	+8.1
Labour	Dylan Harrison	12,303	25.2	−10.9
Liberal Democrats	Thomas Janke	4,067	8.3	+5.6
Green	Tim Dawes	1,491	3.0	+1.4
Majority		18,726	38.3	+19.0
Turnout		48,890	69.2	−3.0
Conservative hold		Swing	+9.5	

General election 2017: The Wrekin
Party	Candidate	Votes	%	±%
Conservative	Mark Pritchard	27,451	55.4	+5.7
Labour	Dylan Harrison	17,887	36.1	+10.1
UKIP	Denis Allen	1,656	3.3	−13.5
Liberal Democrats	Rod Keyes	1,345	2.7	−1.6
Green	Pat McCarthy	804	1.6	− 1.6
Independent	Fay Easton	380	0.8	New
Majority		9,564	19.3	−4.4
Turnout		49,523	72.2	+3.3
Conservative hold		Swing	−2.2	

General election 2015: The Wrekin
Party	Candidate	Votes	%	±%
Conservative	Mark Pritchard	22,579	49.7	+2.0
Labour	Katrina Gilman	11,836	26.0	−1.1
UKIP	Jill Seymour	7,620	16.8	+12.3
Liberal Democrats	Rod Keyes	1,959	4.3	−13.1
Green	Cath Edwards	1,443	3.2	New
Majority		10,743	23.7	+3.1
Turnout		45,437	68.9	−1.2
Conservative hold		Swing	+1.55	

General election 2010: The Wrekin
Party	Candidate	Votes	%	±%
Conservative	Mark Pritchard	21,922	47.7	+5.6
Labour Co-op	Paul Kalinauckas	12,472	27.1	−12.4
Liberal Democrats	Alyson Cameron-Daw	8,019	17.4	+2.4
UKIP	Malcolm Hurst	2,050	4.5	+0.9
BNP	Susan Harwood	1,505	3.3	New
Majority		9,450	20.6	+18.6
Turnout		45,968	70.1	+3.1
Conservative hold		Swing	+8.9	

=== Elections in the 2000s ===
General election 2005: The Wrekin
Party	Candidate	Votes	%	±%
Conservative	Mark Pritchard	18,899	41.9	+3.5
Labour	Peter Bradley	17,957	39.9	−7.2
Liberal Democrats	Bill Tomlinson	6,608	14.7	+3.3
UKIP	Bruce Lawson	1,590	3.5	+0.4
Majority		942	2.0	N/A
Turnout		45,054	67.0	+3.9
Conservative gain from Labour		Swing	+5.4	

General election 2001: The Wrekin
Party	Candidate	Votes	%	±%
Labour	Peter Bradley	19,532	47.1	+0.2
Conservative	Jacob Rees-Mogg	15,945	38.4	−1.8
Liberal Democrats	Ian Jenkins	4,738	11.4	−1.4
UKIP	Denis Brookes	1,275	3.1	New
Majority		3,587	8.7	+2.0
Turnout		41,490	63.1	−13.5
Labour hold		Swing	+0.95	

=== Elections in the 1990s ===
General election 1997: The Wrekin
Party	Candidate	Votes	%	±%
Labour	Peter Bradley	21,243	46.9	
Conservative	Peter Bruinvels	18,218	40.2	
Liberal Democrats	Ian Jenkins	5,807	12.8	
Majority		3,025	6.7	N/A
Turnout		45,268	76.6	
Labour gain from Conservative		Swing		

Note: although The Wrekin was a Labour-held seat in the previous Parliament, boundary changes removed many Labour-leaning areas that now fall in the neighbouring seat of Telford, which Bruce Grocott decided to contest in 1997 instead of the new Wrekin seat. These changes made it notionally a Conservative seat, hence this is a gain rather than a hold.

General election 1992: The Wrekin
Party	Candidate	Votes	%	±%
Labour	Bruce Grocott	33,865	48.3	+5.5
Conservative	Elizabeth Holt	27,217	38.8	−1.8
Liberal Democrats	Anthony West	8,032	11.5	−5.1
Green	Robert Saunders	1,008	1.4	New
Majority		6,648	9.5	+7.3
Turnout		70,122	77.1	−1.2
Labour hold		Swing	+3.6	

=== Elections in the 1980s ===
General election 1987: The Wrekin
Party	Candidate	Votes	%	±%
Labour	Bruce Grocott	27,681	42.8	+6.1
Conservative	Warren Hawksley	26,225	40.6	+1.6
SDP	George Cook	10,737	16.6	−7.8
Majority		1,456	2.2	N/A
Turnout		64,643	78.3	+2.8
Labour gain from Conservative		Swing	+2.3	

General election 1983: The Wrekin
Party	Candidate	Votes	%	±%
Conservative	Warren Hawksley	22,710	39.0	−6.6
Labour	Bruce Grocott	21,379	36.7	−7.5
SDP	Mark Biltcliffe	14,208	24.4	New
Majority		1,331	2.3	+0.9
Turnout		58,297	75.5	−2.9
Conservative hold		Swing	+0.45	

=== Elections in the 1970s ===
General election 1979: The Wrekin
Party	Candidate	Votes	%	±%
Conservative	Warren Hawksley	32,672	45.6	+7.8
Labour	Gerald Fowler	31,707	44.2	−4.5
Liberal	R. Yarnell	7,331	10.2	−3.3
Majority		965	1.4	N/A
Turnout		71,710	78.4	+3.9
Conservative gain from Labour		Swing		

General election October 1974: The Wrekin
Party	Candidate	Votes	%	±%
Labour	Gerald Fowler	30,385	48.7	+2.4
Conservative	Philip Banks	23,547	37.8	+1.4
Liberal	Wally Dewsnip	8,442	13.5	−3.8
Majority		6,838	10.9	+1.0
Turnout		62,374	74.5	−6.3
Labour hold		Swing		

General election February 1974: The Wrekin
Party	Candidate	Votes	%	±%
Labour	Gerald Fowler	30,642	46.3	−3.2
Conservative	Anthony Trafford	24,121	36.4	−14.1
Liberal	Ian George Powney	11,487	17.3	New
Majority		6,521	9.9	N/A
Turnout		66,250	80.8	+2.0
Labour gain from Conservative		Swing		

General election 1970: The Wrekin
Party	Candidate	Votes	%	±%
Conservative	Anthony Trafford	26,282	50.5	+1.4
Labour	Gerald Fowler	25,764	49.5	−1.4
Majority		518	1.0	N/A
Turnout		52,046	78.8	−2.5
Conservative gain from Labour		Swing		

=== Elections in the 1960s ===
General election 1966: The Wrekin
Party	Candidate	Votes	%	±%
Labour	Gerald Fowler	23,692	50.9	+8.2
Conservative	William Yates	22,846	49.1	+0.4
Majority		846	1.8	N/A
Turnout		46,538	81.3	−0.7
Labour gain from Conservative		Swing		

General election 1964: The Wrekin
Party	Candidate	Votes	%	±%
Conservative	William Yates	21,765	48.7	−4.9
Labour	Donald Bruce	19,078	42.7	−3.7
Liberal	John Nicholas Davies	3,839	8.6	New
Majority		2,687	6.0	−1.2
Turnout		44,682	82.0	−2.2
Conservative hold		Swing		

=== Elections in the 1950s ===
General election 1959: The Wrekin
Party	Candidate	Votes	%	±%
Conservative	William Yates	22,030	53.6	+3.0
Labour	Donald Bruce	19,052	46.4	−3.0
Majority		2,978	7.2	+6.0
Turnout		41,082	84.20	+4.1
Conservative hold		Swing		

General election 1955: The Wrekin
Party	Candidate	Votes	%	±%
Conservative	William Yates	19,019	50.6	+3.9
Labour	Ivor Owen Thomas	18,541	49.4	−3.0
Majority		478	1.2	N/A
Turnout		37,560	80.1	−3.0
Conservative gain from Labour		Swing		

General election 1951: The Wrekin
Party	Candidate	Votes	%	±%
Labour	Ivor Owen Thomas	20,109	52.4	−1.3
Conservative	John Cordle	18,305	46.7	+0.4
Majority		1,804	4.7	−2.7
Turnout		38,414	83.1	+1.8
Labour hold		Swing		

General election 1950: The Wrekin
Party	Candidate	Votes	%	±%
Labour	Ivor Owen Thomas	19,730	53.7	−2.6
Conservative	F.G. Bibbings	17,039	46.3	+2.6
Majority		2,691	7.4	−5.2
Turnout		36,769	81.3	+9.0
Labour hold		Swing		

=== Elections in the 1940s ===
General election 1945: The Wrekin
Party	Candidate	Votes	%	±%
Labour	Ivor Owen Thomas	22,453	56.3	+14.2
Conservative	Arthur Colegate	17,422	43.7	−14.2
Majority		5,031	12.6	N/A
Turnout		39,875	72.3	−6.2
Labour gain from Conservative		Swing		

1941 The Wrekin by-election
Party	Candidate	Votes	%	±%
Conservative	Arthur Colegate	9,946	53.2	−4.7
Ind. Conservative	Noel Pemberton Billing	7,121	38.1	New
Independent	Arthur Patrick Kennedy	1,638	8.8	New
Majority		2,825	15.1	−0.6
Turnout		18,705		
Conservative hold		Swing		

=== Elections in the 1930s ===
General Election 1939/40:

Another General Election was required to take place before the end of 1940. The political parties had been making preparations for an election to take place from 1939 and by the end of this year, the following candidates had been selected;

- Conservative: James Baldwin-Webb
- Labour: Ivor Owen Thomas

General election 1935: The Wrekin
Party	Candidate	Votes	%	±%
Conservative	James Baldwin-Webb	20,665	57.9	−3.2
Labour	Geoffrey Garratt	15,040	42.1	+3.2
Majority		5,625	15.8	−6.4
Turnout		35,705	78.5	−4.7
Conservative hold		Swing		

General election 1931: The Wrekin
Party	Candidate	Votes	%	±%
Conservative	James Baldwin-Webb	22,258	61.1	+25.5
Labour	Edith Picton-Turbervill	14,162	38.9	−4.5
Majority		8,096	22.2	N/A
Turnout		36,420	83.2	+6.5
Conservative gain from Labour		Swing		

=== Elections in the 1920s ===
General election 1929: The Wrekin
Party	Candidate	Votes	%	±%
Labour	Edith Picton-Turbervill	14,569	44.4	0.0
Unionist	Thomas Oakley	11,707	35.6	▼20.1
Liberal	W. E. Boyes	6,575	20.0	New
Majority		2,862	8.8	N/A
Turnout		32,851	76.7	▲2.5
Registered electors		42,823		
Labour gain from Unionist		Swing	▲10.1	

General election 1924: The Wrekin
Party	Candidate	Votes	%	±%
Unionist	Thomas Oakley	14,003	55.7	▲8.9
Labour	Henry Nixon	11,132	44.4	▼8.8
Majority		2,871	11.3	N/A
Turnout		25,135	74.2	▲8.2
Registered electors		33,866		
Unionist gain from Labour		Swing	▲2.5	

General election 1923: The Wrekin
Party	Candidate	Votes	%	±%
Labour	Henry Nixon	11,657	53.2	▲5.6
Unionist	Arthur Nicholas Fielden	10,274	46.8	▼5.6
Majority		1,383	6.4	N/A
Turnout		21,931	66.0	▼1.8
Registered electors		33,253		
Labour gain from Unionist		Swing	▲5.6	

General election 1922: The Wrekin
Party	Candidate	Votes	%	±%
Unionist	Howard Button	11,652	52.4	New
Labour	Richard Edward Jones	10,603	47.6	N/A
Majority		1,049	4.8	N/A
Turnout		22,255	67.8	N/A
Registered electors		32,844		
Unionist gain from Ind. Parliamentary Group		Swing		

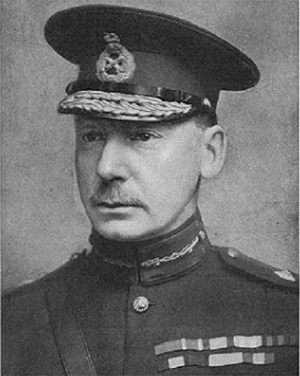
Townshend

The Wrekin by-election, November 1920
Party	Candidate	Votes	%	±%
Ind. Parliamentary Group	Charles Townshend	14,565	57.9	▲17.2
Labour	Charles Duncan	10,600	42.1	▲3.7
Majority		3,965	15.8	▲13.5
Turnout		25,165	78.3	▲7.3
Registered electors		32,053		
Ind. Parliamentary Group hold		Swing		

The Wrekin by-election, February 1920
Party		Candidate	Votes	%	±%
	Ind. Parliamentary Group	Charles Palmer	9,267	40.7	New
	Labour	Charles Duncan	8,729	38.4	New
C	Liberal	John Bayley	4,750	20.9	N/A
Majority			538	2.3	N/A
Turnout			22,746	71.0	N/A
	Ind. Parliamentary Group gain from Liberal		Swing	N/A	
C indicates candidate endorsed by the coalition government.

=== Elections in the 1910s ===
Henry

General election 1918: The Wrekin
Party		Candidate	Votes	%	±%
C	Liberal	Charles Henry	Unopposed		
	Liberal win (new seat)				
C indicates candidate endorsed by the coalition government.

== See also ==
- Parliamentary constituencies in Shropshire
- List of parliamentary constituencies in West Midlands (region)
