= 1941 The Wrekin by-election =

UK Parliamentary by-election

- 26 September 1941

The Wrekin
- Turnout: 18,705
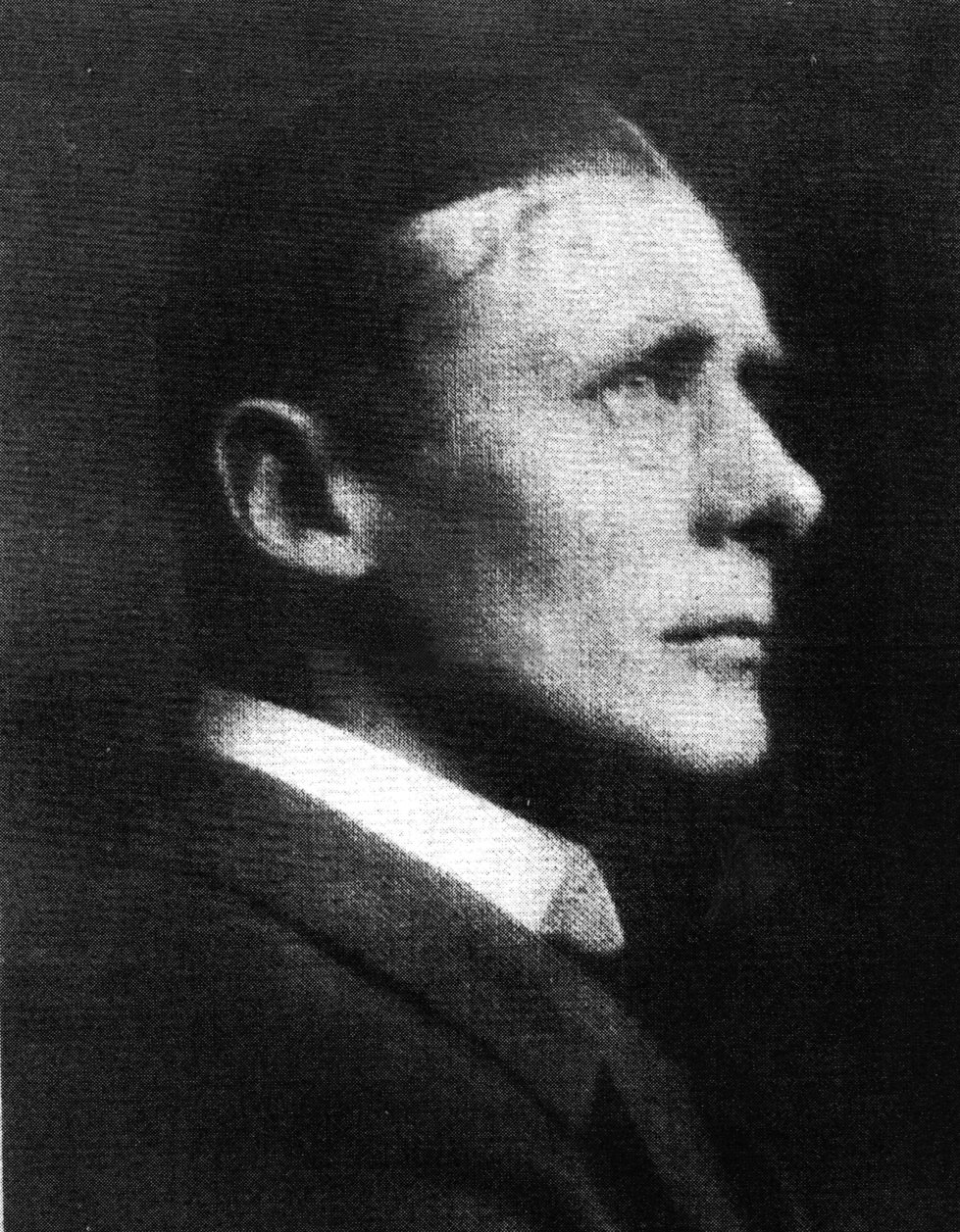
	First party	Second party	Third party
Candidate	Arthur Colegate	Noel Pemberton Billing	Arthur Patrick Kennedy
Party	Conservative	National	Independent
Popular vote	9,946	7,121	1,638
Percentage	53.17	38.07	8.76
Swing	-4.71	New	New

The Wrekin by-election of 1941 was held on 26 September 1941. The by-election was held due to the death of the incumbent Conservative MP, James Baldwin-Webb. It was won by the Conservative candidate Arthur Colegate.

The Wrekin by-election, 1941
Party	Candidate	Votes	%	±%
Conservative	Arthur Colegate	9,946	53.17	−4.71
National	Noel Pemberton Billing	7,121	38.07	New
Independent	Arthur Patrick Kennedy	1,638	8.76	New
Majority		2,825	15.10	−0.65
Turnout		18,705		
Conservative hold		Swing		
