= Rudolf Olden =

German lawyer and journalist (1885–1940)

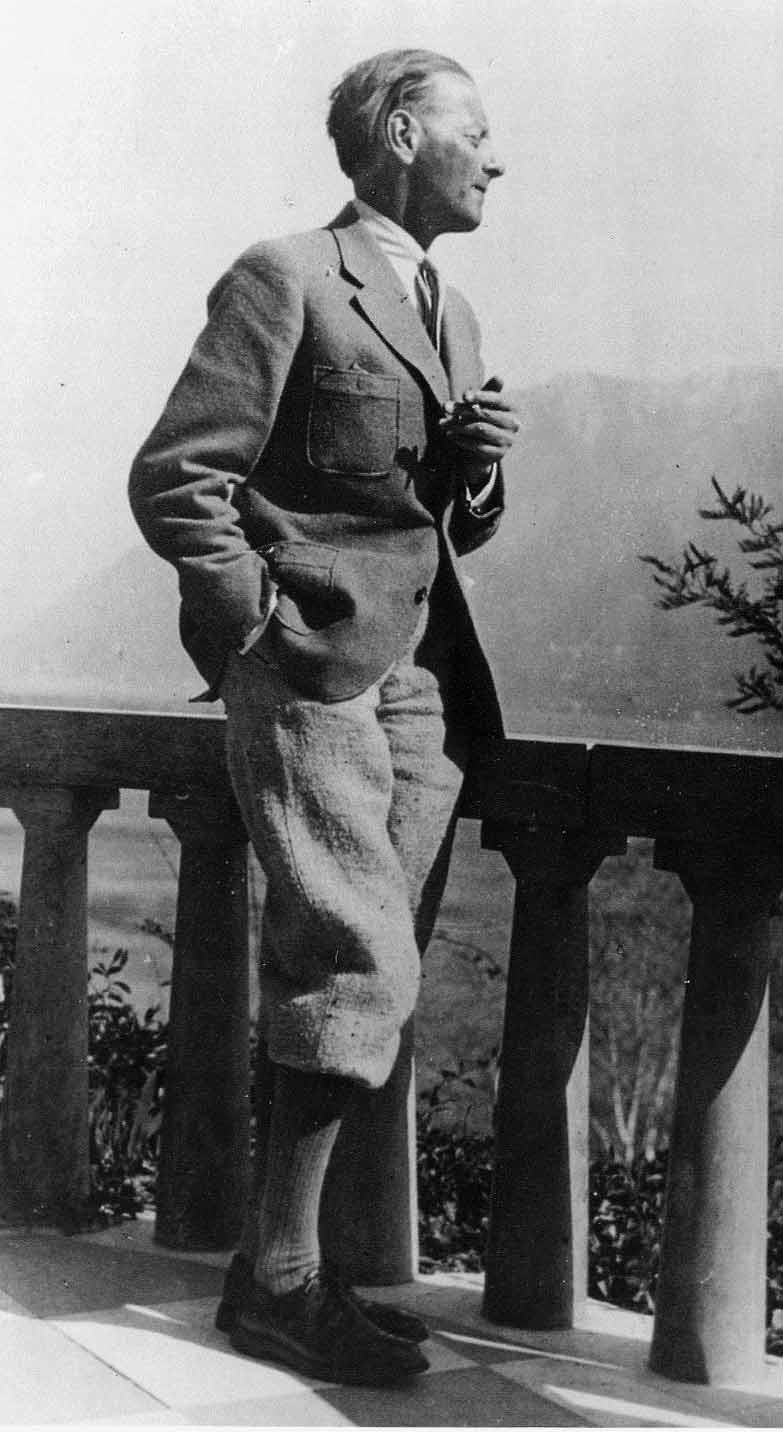
Rudolf Olden in Ascona, around 1920-23

Rudolf Olden (14 January 1885 in Stettin – 18 September 1940) was a German lawyer and journalist. In the Weimar period he was a well-known voice in the political debate, a vocal opponent of the Nazis, a fierce advocate of human rights and one of the first to alert the world to the treatment of Jews by the Nazis in 1934. He is the author of Hitler der Eroberer. Entlarvung einer Legende ("Hitler the Conqueror, Debunking of a Myth") which is considered part of the German exile literature. The book was promptly banned by the Nazis. Shortly after its publication by Querido in Amsterdam, Olden's citizenship was revoked and he emigrated, together with his wife, first to the United Kingdom and then, in 1940, to the United States. On 18 September both died in the U-boat attack on the SS City of Benares in the Atlantic.

He was a German Liberal of the best sort, rather more pugnacious than the average British Liberal, because he had more to fight against.

— Gilbert Murray, preface to The History of Liberty in Germany, 1946

== World War I and the Interbellum ==
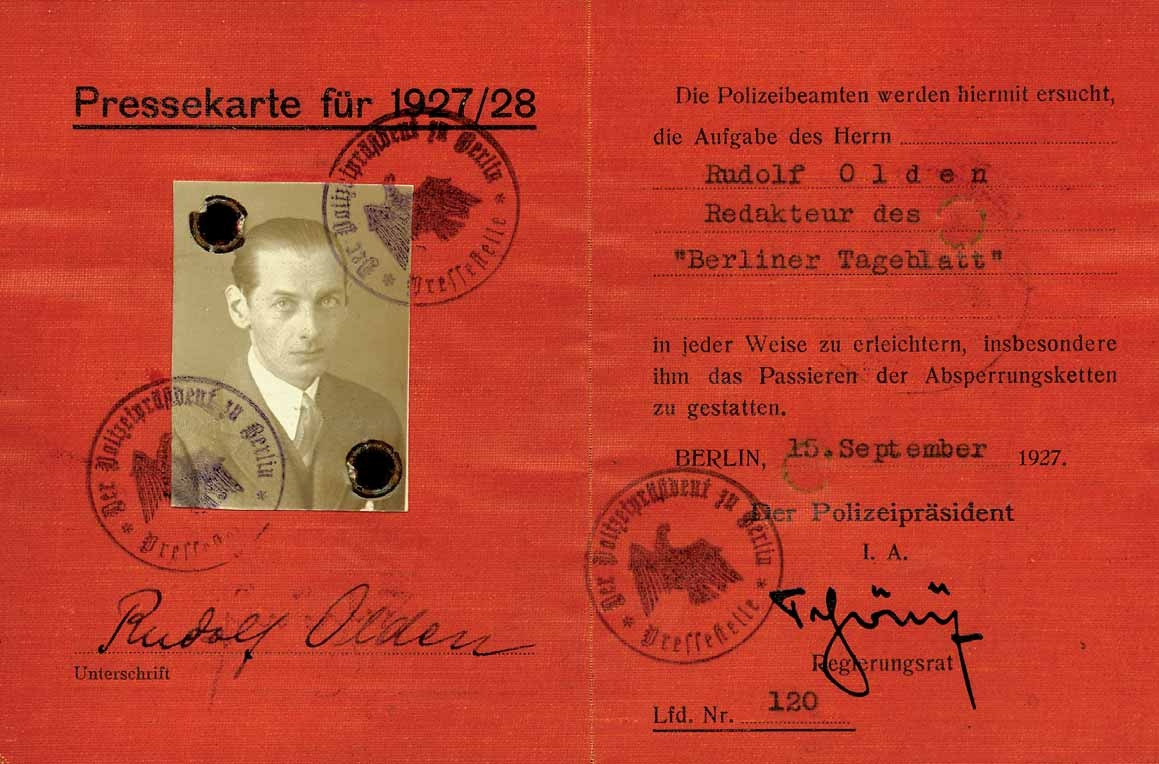
Presscard, 1927/28

Rudolf Olden was born in Stettin (now Szczecin) as the son of the author Johann Oppenheim, (who changed his name to Hans Olden in 1891) and the actress Rosa Stein. Rudolf was the younger brother of the author Balder Olden. After completing his education, he chose a military career and joined the Leib-Dragoner-Regiment Nr. 24 (a cavalry regiment) in Darmstadt. During World War I, he was first stationed in Belgium but was transferred to the Eastern Front in 1915. Olden survived the war as a first lieutenant.

The war left a lasting impression and, once it had ended, Olden left the army and started as editor of the pacifistic periodical Der Friede ("Peace") in Vienna and Der Neue Tag. In 1920 he married the psychoanalyst Marie-Christine Fournier (the daughter of the Viennese historian Professor August Fournier) and was soon absorbed into the circles of journalists and writers. After Der Neue Tag became insolvent, he founded a magazine (Er und Sie, "He and She"), dedicated to Lebenskultur und Erotik, which was soon at the center of a heated debate about public morals and common decency.

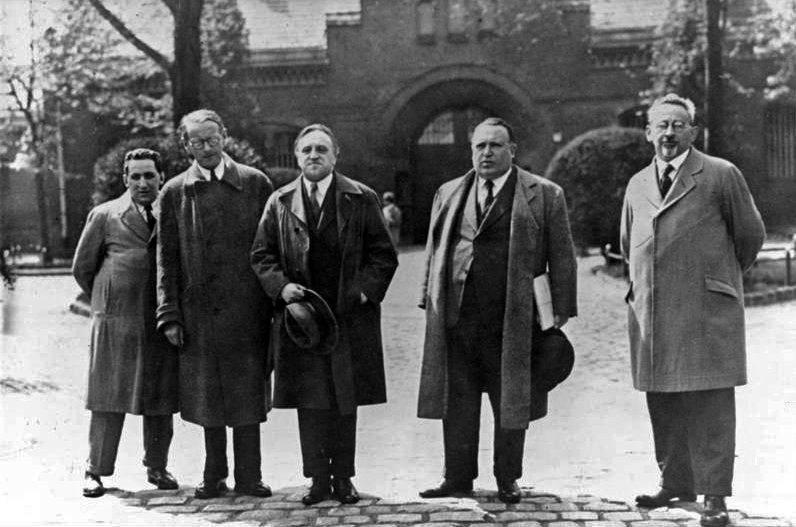
Carl von Ossietzky in front of Tegel prison Left to right: Kurt Großmann, Dr. Rudolf Olden, both members of the Deutsche Liga für Menschenrechte; Carl von Ossietzky, Dr. Apfel, Lawyer; Dr. Rosenfeld

In 1926 Olden was asked by Theodor Wolff, publisher of the liberal Berliner Tageblatt newspaper, to come to Berlin, where he soon caused some uproar with his editorials. Olden soon became Editor in Chief and also wrote for other publications, such as Die Menschenrechte ("Human Rights"), Das Tage-Buch ("The Diary") and Die Weltbühne ("The Global Stage").

In the same year, Olden was admitted as a lawyer and for a number of years practiced law. In 1931 he was chosen to be a member of the managing board of the Deutsche Liga für Menschenrechte ("German league for Human Rights") and in the same year he defended Carl von Ossietzky, who was prosecuted for insulting the Reichswehr, because he published an article by Kurt Tucholsky which included the phrase "soldiers are murderers". Olden's defense was successful and Von Ossietzky was acquitted.

In 1933 Olden addressed the Schutzbund deutscher Schriftsteller ("protective union of German authors") and invited them to the congress Das Freie Wort ("the free word") in the Kroll Opera House two days later. One thousand five hundred artists, authors, scientists and politicians accepted the invitation to protest against the increasing pressure on artistic, journalistic and academic freedoms. It was the last congress organized by the liberal, social democratic and communist parties until 1945.

== In exile from the Third Reich ==
Cover of the essay Hitler der Eroberer, Hitler shaking the hand of Reichspräsident Von Hindenburg

After the Reichstag fire, Olden was warned by friends and was barely able to escape arrest. He managed to escape the SS - who were searching for him in the high courts, whereas on that day he was in the lower courts - by hiding with friends for a night. The following day, he travelled to the mountains and crossed the Czech border on wooden skis. The following day, his personal secretary and by that time lover, Ika Halpern, daughter of George Halpern a prominent Zionist of British descent, joined him in Prague where he published the essay version of Hitler der Eroberer anonymously. From Prague they traveled to Paris, where he published the noted Schwarzbuch über die Lage der Juden in Deutschland, the "Black Book on the Situation of the Jews in Germany", in which he warned about the atrocities already commonplace in Germany. He also acted as editor in chief for Das Reich, a newspaper in Saarbrücken, and opposed the reintegration of the Saarland into Nazi Germany.

In this period, Olden could only publish in a few exile magazines, such as Das neue Tage-Buch, Pariser Tageblatt and Die Sammlung. Because of these articles he was invited by the diplomat Gilbert Murray to lecture on German history and politics in Oxford and London, an invitation he gladly accepted. He and Ika were invited to stay with the Murrays and set up home in a little house on their grounds called the Rosary Cottage.

In 1934 he became the de facto secretary of the German P.E.N. chapter in exile and, even though he was never formally elected or appointed, he performed his duties very diligently, providing visas and contacts and seeing to the material needs of fugitive authors, such as Thomas Mann. In 1935 an extended version of the essay he wrote in Prague was published as a book by Querido in Amsterdam. In 1936 the book was published in English as Hitler the Pawn. His 20-year younger half brother, Peter Hans Olden, who became a naturalized U.S. citizen when the Nazi's took power in Germany, collaborated with him on the book.

In 1936 his German citizenship was revoked while Olden continued his work as secretary of the P.E.N. in London and lobbied the Nobel Committee on behalf of Carl von Ossietzky, whom the Nazis had incarcerated. In 1939, at the outbreak of war, Olden was interned and fell ill. In this period he accepted an invitation to lecture at the New School of Social Research in New York City. Earlier the couple had sent their daughter Mary Elizabeth on a child transport to Canada.

On boarding the SS City of Benares, his passport was stamped with the ominous words "No Return". On 18 September 1940, while part of a convoy, the City of Benares was torpedoed by the German submarine U-48. As a result, 258 people died, including all but 19 of 100 British children being evacuated to Canada. Rudolf Olden died, with Ika Halpern whom he had married in London, at the age of 55, she was 35. A witness recalled she had resisted persuasion from fellow passenger-victim, Colonel James Baldwin-Webb, to board a lifeboat, in order to remain with her unwell husband. In the end, her friend, Professor John Percival Day (he survived) managed to persuade her to enter the lifeboat (Boat No. 6), but she died when the boat was being lowered and it tipped, sending her plunging into the sea. Nazi German propaganda later claimed Olden and Baldwin-Webb were sailing on a mission to persuade the then-neutral United States to enter the war.

== Legacy ==
A memorial to Olden was erected at Balliol College, Oxford, on the east wall of the Chapel passage. In 1948 University College London acquired Olden's book collection and archive, which includes around 1000 books on German political and economic history. Olden's archive was transferred to the Special Collections department in 1982.

== Bibliography ==
- Stresemann. Eine Biographie. Rowohlt, Berlin 1929
- Propheten in deutscher Krise. Das Wunderbare oder Die Verzauberten. Eine Sammlung. published by Rudolf Olden. Rowohlt, Berlin 1932.
- Schwarzbuch über die Lage der Juden in Deutschland, Paris 1934.
- Briefe aus den Jahren 1935-1936 (Rudolf Olden, Peter Olden) published by Charmian Brinson
- Hindenburg oder der Geist der preussischen Armee, Paris 1935. Reprinted by Gerstenberg, Hildesheim 1982, ISBN 3-8067-0911-4.
- Hitler der Eroberer. Entlarvung einer Legende, Amsterdam 1935. Reprinted by Fischer Verlag, Frankfurt/M. 1984, ISBN 3-596-25185-0.

=== Posthumous publications ===
- The history of liberty in Germany. Gollancz, London 1946.
- In tiefem Dunkel liegt Deutschland. Von Hitler vertrieben, ein Jahr deutsche Emigration. Metropol Verlag, Berlin 1994, ISBN 3-926893-20-6.
- So viele Bücher, so viele Verbote. Ausstellung “Der deutsche PEN-Club im Exil 1933-1948”. Buchhändler-Vereinigung, Frankfurt/M. 1981, ISBN 3-7657-1039-3.

== Sources ==
- Hitler der Eroberer, preface by Werner Berthold, Fisher Taschenbuch Verlag GmbH, Frankfurt am Main, January 1984, in the series verboten und verbrannt/Exil, ISBN 978-3596251858
- Ingo Müller: Rudolf Olden (1885-1940). Journalist und Anwalt der Republik. In: Redaktion „Kritische Justiz“ (Hrsg.), Streitbare Juristen. Eine andere Tradition, 1988 Baden-Baden p. 180.
- The History of Liberty in Germany, preface by Gilbert Murray, Victor Gollancz Ltd London, 1946, available online at archive.org.
- Balke, Florian (May 4, 2010), "Rudolf Olden. Der Mann, der Hitler früh durchschaute", Frankfurter Allgemeine Zeitung (in German)
