= SS City of Benares =

British passenger steamship sunk by a Nazi German U-Boat in 1940

Coordinates: 56°43′N 21°15′W

- City of Benares during her sea trials

History

United Kingdom
- Name: City of Benares
- Namesake: Benares (now Varanasi)
- Owner: Ellerman Lines Ltd, London
- Operator: Ellerman City Line Ltd
- Port of registry: Glasgow
- Route: Peacetime: Liverpool - Mumbai, Karachi, Colombo, Madras, and Calcutta via Suez Canal or South Africa Wartime: Liverpool - Montreal, Quebec, and New York City
- Builder: Barclay, Curle & Co, Whiteinch, Glasgow
- Yard number: 656
- Launched: 5 August 1936
- Completed: October 1936
- Acquired: 15 October 1936
- Maiden voyage: 24 October 1936
- In service: 24 October 1936
- Refit: 3 September 1939
- Identification: UK official number 164096; call sign GZBW
- Nickname(s): Benares; The Children's Ship; The Children's Liner
- Fate: Sunk, 17 September 1940

General characteristics
- Type: Ocean liner
- Tonnage: 11,081 GRT; 6,720 NRT
- Displacement: 17,000 tons
- Length: 509 ft (155.1 m) overall; 486.1 ft (148.2 m) registered
- Beam: 62.7 ft (19.1 m)
- Draught: 28 ft 5 3/4 in (8.68 m)
- Depth: 30.8 ft (9.4 m)
- Decks: 3
- Propulsion: Three Cammell Laird steam turbines (1,450 hp (1,080 kW)), single reduction geared driving a single steel screw
- Speed: 15 knots (28 km/h; 17 mph) recommended 17.75 knots (32.87 km/h; 20.43 mph) maximum reached
- Capacity: 219 passengers (single class)
- Crew: 209
- Armament: DEMS (wartime)

SS City of Benares was a British steam turbine ocean liner, built for Ellerman Lines by Barclay, Curle & Co of Glasgow in 1936.

During the Second World War, City of Benares was used as an evacuee ship to transport 90 children from the United Kingdom to Canada. The German submarine U-48 sank her by torpedoes in September 1940 with the loss of 260 people out of a complement of 408, including the death of 77 of the evacuated children. The sinking caused such public outrage in the United Kingdom that it led to Winston Churchill cancelling the Children's Overseas Reception Board (CORB) plan to relocate British children abroad.

== Prewar history ==
City of Benares was built by Barclay Curle in Glasgow, Scotland. She was launched on 5 August 1936, and completed in October 1936. Benares, as she was known, was 509 feet (155 meters) long, with a beam of 62 feet 7 inches (19.08 m) and draught of 30 feet 8 inches (9.35 m). She was powered by three steam turbines, which were supplied by Cammell Laird. They were oil-fired and drove a single screw via single-reduction gearing, giving her a speed of 15 knots (28 km/h), though, during her trials she achieved a speed of 17.75 knots (32.87 km/h), without excessively pressing the turbines.

Her maiden voyage departed on 24 October 1936 from Liverpool to Bombay via Marseille, Suez and Karachi. Her return voyage departed on 7 December 1936, with a full cargo of Indian produce. From the beginning of her maiden voyage to the sailing of City of Port Elizabeth in 1952, she was the largest and most modern ship in the Ellerman fleet. She was also the only ship in Ellerman Lines that had more than one funnel (though her forward funnel was a dummy). She was managed by City Line Ltd on behalf of her owners, Ellerman Lines Ltd. The UK official number was 164096 and her call sign was GZBW.

== Second World War ==
When war was declared on Germany by Great Britain on 3 September 1939, Benares was on her way to England, having just finished her usual cruise to India. When the news of war reached the ship she was immediately re-routed to Cape Town, South Africa. There, all passengers disembarked, the ship was fitted out with a stern deck gun and repainted in naval grey to camouflage her from enemy U-boats. When Benares sailed again, she had no passengers.

Later in May 1940, Ellerman Lines decided to provide three of its largest passenger ships, Benares, City of Paris, and City of Simla, for the CORB to evacuate children. These three liners were fitted out for war service, and by August Benares, City of Simla, and City of Paris were ready for service. This would be Benares' first Atlantic-crossing. On 10 September 1940, City of Paris set sail with 45 CORB children, bound for Cape Town.

== Final voyage ==
On 13 September 1940 Benares departed Liverpool, England, sailing in Convoy OB 213, bound for Montreal, with 408 people — 90 CORB children (ages five to fifteen), their ten escorts (3 men, 7 women), 91 fare-paying passengers (including ten children and forty-three women), 6 convoy representatives, 168 Indian Lascars (the catering crew was from Portuguese Goa) and 43 British crew (including five women). She was under the command of Captain Landles Nicoll and the commodore of the convoy, Admiral Edmond J. G. Mackinnon. As she was the lead ship of the convoy, she was placed in the centre column, column 5. The convoy had the protection of a destroyer, HMS Winchelsea, accompanied by two corvettes — HMS Gloxinia and HMS Gladiolus.

Some of the CORB children could rightly be called refugees. Two of the children, Patricia (Pat) Allen (of Liverpool), twelve, and Michael Brooker (of Kent), ten, called 'veterans' by the other children, had survived the U-boat attack on Volendam, which had been carrying 321 CORB children, 31 escorts, 255 other passengers, and 273 crew. The German submarine U-60 hit Volendam with two torpedoes, only one of which detonated. The other was found later in the ship's bow. The ship did not sink, but all the passengers were still evacuated in eighteen lifeboats. There was only one casualty, the ship's purser, who fell between a lifeboat and the ship, and subsequently drowned. Patricia Allen came home to discover her house had been destroyed, while Michael Brooker's had an unexploded bomb in it.

The Grimmond home in Brixton had been bombed too, so Edward Grimmond and his wife, Hannah, decided to send five of their eleven children off to Sherwood Lane School in Liverpool (where the CORB children were staying before they boarded Benares). They were Augusta (Gussie), thirteen; Violet, ten; Constance (Connie), nine; Edward (Eddie), eight; and Leonard (Lenny), five. These children had been on the reserve list but when the escorts saw the ordeal the children had been through, they took them off the reserve list and added them to the list of children who would be sailing on Benares. It was a decision they would regret for the rest of their lives.

The six escorts assigned to care for CORB children were Miss Mary Cornish, an accomplished pianist who taught lessons; Miss Sybil Gilliat-Smith, a preschool teacher, accomplished artist, and ambulance driver during air raids. Mrs. Maud Hillman, an infant teacher; Mr. Michael Rennie, who felt a calling to the church and was going to go into theology after the trip; Reverend William Henry King, 28, an Anglican cleric; and Father Roderick (Rory) O'Sullivan,, a Roman Catholic priest. Accompanying the escorts who cared for the children were senior escort Miss Marjorie Day and a teacher at a private girls school; reserve escort Mrs. Lilian Towns, an ambulance driver from New Zealand, plus doctor Mrs. Margaret Zeal, and her assistant, as nurse, Miss Dorothy Smith. Two of the paying passengers, Anne Fleetwood-Hesketh (the mother of Roger Fleetwood-Hesketh) and movie director, Ruby Grierson spent their day with the children. Mrs. Fleetwood-Hesketh had volunteered early on in the voyage to help with the children, while Grierson filmed the children for a new movie about the government evacuation of children.

Among the paying passengers were some twenty foreign passengers, several of whom were fleeing from the Nazis. Many had made heart-wrenching escapes, in which they had to leave their families behind. Helen Schoenbach, a twenty-two year old German girl, had escaped from Germany with her family, now she had to leave them in England. She remembered the streets in Germany, Catholics, Jews, Slavs and the other so called 'inferior races' being taken away by soldiers, either to be killed or to work in death camps and concentration camps. One of the passengers, Mrs. Amelie von Ingersleben, a German baroness and author, had managed to cleverly escape from a concentration camp.

Among the paying passengers, ten of whom were the young sons and daughters of civilians, were the British Parliamentarian, Colonel James Baldwin-Webb, on his way to Canada to help with the Red Cross. Rudolf Olden, a German author, was forced to sail to North America, as he had been exiled from Germany for criticizing Hitler in his newspaper. With him was his wife Ika, though their daughter, Mary Olden, had been sent ahead of them on another passenger liner. Monika Lanyi, daughter of the famed German writer Thomas Mann (who had also been exiled from Germany) was traveling with her husband, Jeno. Alderman William Golightly, of the Northumberland Miners' Association, was on his way to a business meeting. Also aboard was the playwright, Arthur Wimperis, and the fashion couple Henry and Phyllis Digby-Morton.

The ten children among the fare-paying passengers included the three Bech children — Barbara, fourteen; Sonia, eleven; and Derek, nine — were travelling with their mother Marguerite. They were leaving their home in Bognor Regis, while their father, Emil, would stay in London to continue his Danish porcelain business. Patricia (Pat) Bulmer, fourteen, was traveling with her school-friend, Dorothy Galliard, fifteen, and her mother, Alice Bulmer; she was leaving her home in Wallasey. Lawrence and Patricia Croasdaile, two and nine, were traveling with their mother Florence, an American woman to live with their grandmother in Canada because their father had been captured by the Nazis when his ship was torpedoed and they were waiting for news about him. Diana "Honey" Pine, six, was traveling with her mother Emma. Anthony Quinton, fifteen, was traveling with his mother Letitia, whose mother had asked them to join her in Canada away from the war ("You're no use there," she wrote to them). Colin Richardson, eleven, was traveling alone, as his mother and father (who was an air raid warden) were staying in England with his brother, Julian, who was only five. His mother, instead, had him assigned a private escort, named Laszlo Raskai, a Hungarian BBC reporter, traveling with colleague Eric Davis, also a BBC reporter.

There were also four teenage children, three of whom were part of the Choat family. Frank Choat had served in Gallipoli and had been handicapped by his injuries. When he was taken to England he met his wife, Sylvia, and they fell in love. Now, after finishing their three children's education, they were returning to Canada. Their children were Russell Choat, sixteen; Peter Choat, eighteen, and Rachel Choat, nineteen. The other teenage child was Norma Jacoby, sixteen; she was traveling alone.

=== Sinking ===
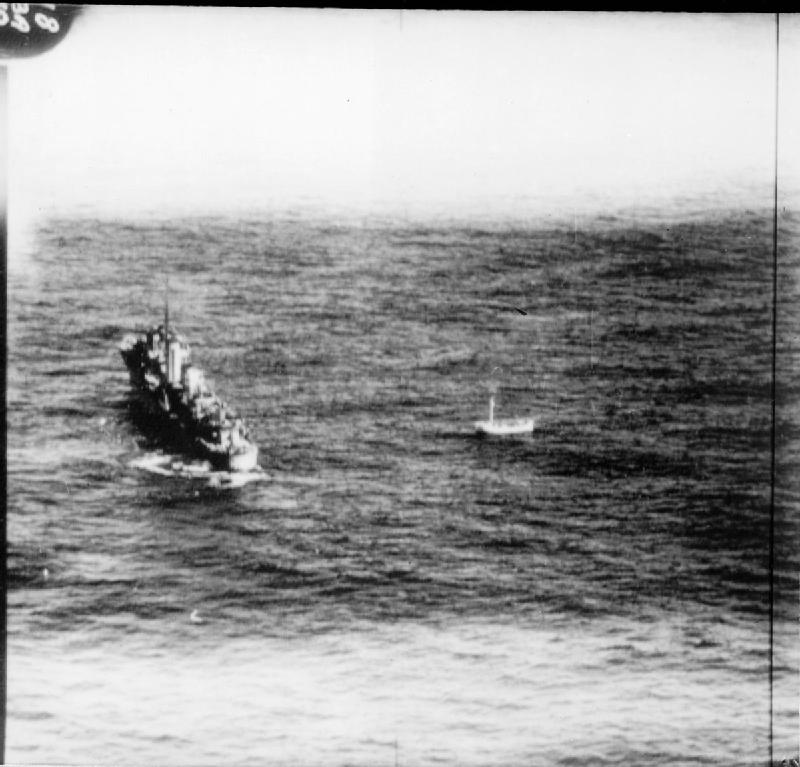
HMS Anthony rescues survivors from a lifeboat from City of Benares which had been adrift for eight days.

Late in the evening of 17 September, City of Benares was sighted by U-48, commanded by Kapitänleutnant Heinrich Bleichrodt, who fired two torpedoes at her at 10:00 PM. Both torpedoes missed, and at 10:01 PM on 17 September, the U-boat fired another torpedo at her. The torpedo struck the ship in the stern at 10:03 PM, causing her to sink within 31 minutes, 253 miles (407 km) west-southwest of Rockall and 630 miles (1,010 km) from the nearest inhabited land.

Fifteen minutes after the torpedo hit, the captain ordered the vessel abandoned, though there were difficulties with lowering the lifeboats on each side of the ship (only one lifeboat of twelve aboard were lowered correctly). HMS Hurricane arrived on the scene 24 hours later, picked up 105 survivors, and landed them at Greenock. Among the survivors were 21 women, seven CORB children (four boys and three girls), and six fare-paying passenger children (three boys and three girls). Only one family that included more than three people completely survived (Barbara, Derek, and Sonia Bech — aged 14, 9, and 11 — with their mother, Marguerite). Of the other families or groups of passengers travelling together that contained more than three people, all the Grimmonds died, all three Pugh brothers (travelling with CORB) died, all three Beasley sisters (travelling with CORB), all three Moss sisters (travelling with CORB), all three Croasdailes (travelling privately), Frank Choat died (his wife and children survived), and Pat Bulmer was the only survivor of her group (her mother and school friend both died, likely in the capsizing of Lifeboat 1). During the attack, SS Marina was also torpedoed. Hurricane's crew was unaware that the lifeboat was from Marina, but it was still searching for lifeboats and rafts. Lifeboat 12 had drifted out of the "search box" organized by a Hurricane crew member, but night came and Hurricane abandoned her search. It was assumed that Lifeboat 12 had been overcome by the seas. As a result, Lifeboat 12 was left alone at sea. Its passengers had three weeks' supply of food but enough water for only one week. In the lifeboat were about 32 lascar crewmen, Bohdan Nagorski (a paying passenger), five British crew (Fourth Officer Ronald Cooper, Signalman John Mayhew, Steward George Purvis, Gunner Harry Peard, and Cadet Doug Critchley), escorts Mary Cornish and Father Rory O'Sullivan, and six evacuee boys from the CORB programme — Kenneth (Ken) Sparks (aged 13), Harry Frederick (Fred) Steels (aged 11), William (Billy) Short (aged 9), Derek Capel (aged 12), Paul Shearing (aged 11), and Howard Claytor (aged 11). They spent eight days adrift in the Atlantic Ocean, before being sighted by a Royal Air Force Short Sunderland aircraft, piloted by Australian Bill Garing, and then rescued by convoy escort HMS Anthony. In the end, of the 90 children, 77 died of exposure on lifeboats, died in the sinking, or were missing presumed lost at sea. Three children taken aboard Hurricane died. One boy had been killed in the explosion. 100 of the 119 children aboard were killed in the attack.

== Legacy ==
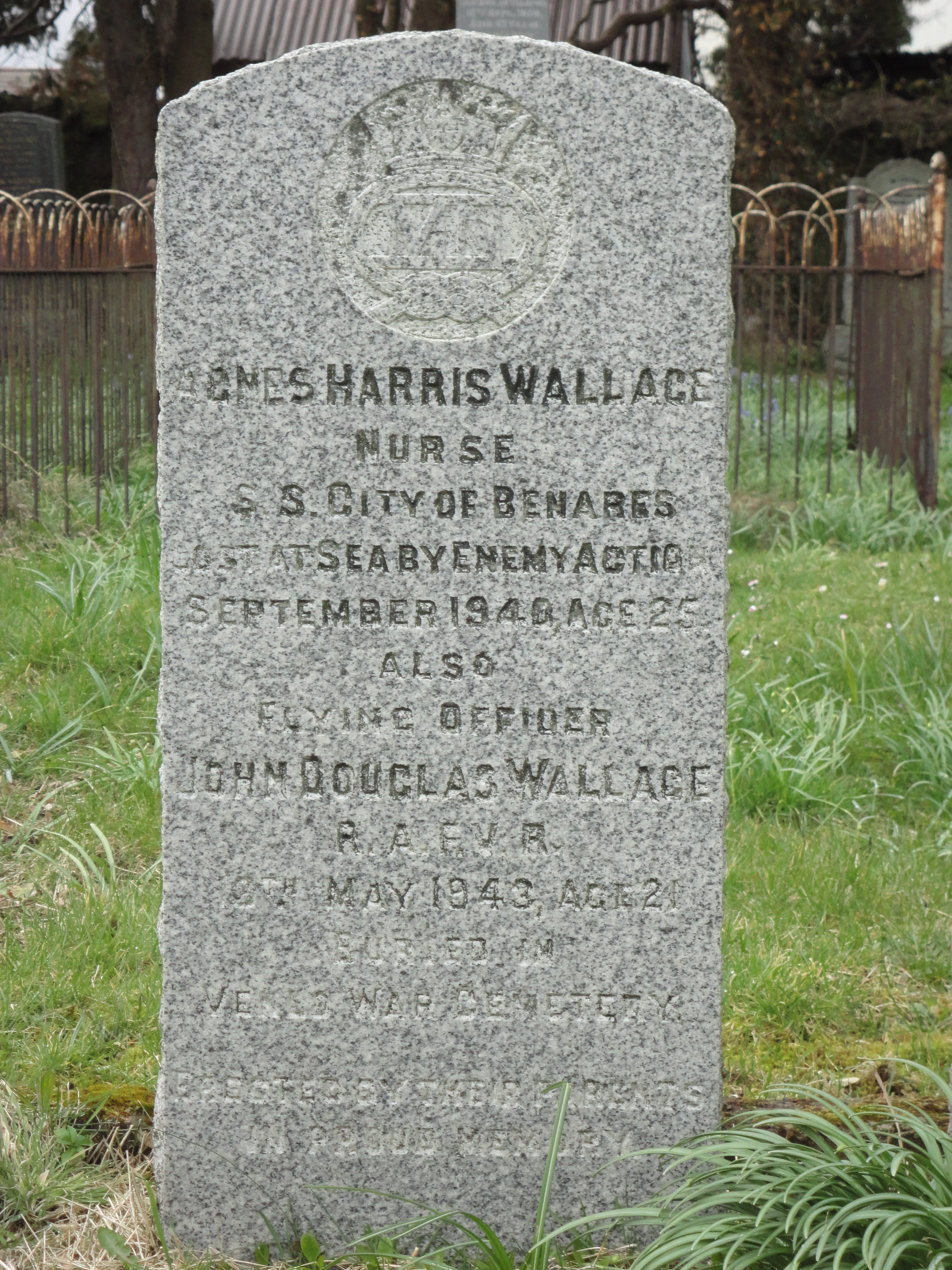
Ullapool, Old Telford Church: memorial to Nurse Agnes Wallace, lost in the sinking of SS City of Benares 1940. She died in the arms of Colin Ryder Richardson, in Lifeboat 2.

In total, 258 of the 408 people aboard were lost. This included the master, three convoy staff members (including the commodore), 122 crew members (including 4 women and 19 children) and 134 passengers (including 31 women and 81 children). Only 13 of the 90 child evacuees and 6 of 10 paying passenger children embarked survived the sinking. The sinking was controversial: the Allied powers criticised the "barbaric" actions of the Germans, and there was an outpouring of sympathy and support for those who had lost children in the sinking.

The Germans defended the attack as being on a legitimate military target, and insisted that the British government was to blame for allowing children to travel on such ships in war zones when the German government had issued repeated warnings. They claimed that Baldwin-Webb and Olden were travelling to America with the aim of persuading the United States to enter the war, and that City of Benares would be used to transport war material back to Britain on her return voyage.

The future of the CORB was already in question after U-60 torpedoed another evacuation ship, Volendam, two weeks earlier. 321 children had been aboard, but all had been rescued by other ships. The directors of the CORB were hopeful that the programme could be continued, and presented a report into the sinking which made recommendations for future operations, which included the use of faster transports and escorts on the North Atlantic routes, and the concentration of the evacuation programme on routes to Australia, India and South Africa, where the weather was better and there were felt to be fewer enemy submarines. The Admiralty pointed out that there were too few fast escorts and ships available, and public opinion was opposed to the continuation of overseas evacuation, fearing further tragedies. Winston Churchill also opposed the scheme, believing evacuations gave aid and comfort to the enemy. The government announced the cancellation of the CORB programme, and all children who were currently preparing to sail were ordered to disembark and return home. Official child evacuation efforts came to a halt with the end of the CORB, but large-scale private evacuation of a further 14,000 children continued until 1941.

After the war, U-48 commander Bleichrodt was put on trial by the Royal Navy for war crimes. He denied any prior knowledge of the presence of children, stating his actions were within the bounds of military policy because City of Benares was in a convoy at night with lights off. The only eyewitness for the prosecution was a BBC radio broadcast by Frank Laskier, a merchant mariner turned wartime propagandist, who claimed to have found the frozen bodies of dead children, and with sailors intuition knew the Germans were laying in wait to sink the ship. The prosecutors also claimed without evidence there were 'secret orders' by the German government. The Navy wanted a scapegoat and they were hoping to secure a conviction by trapping him with his own affidavit statement. Bleichrodt was warned about this so he remained silent during his incarceration as to not accidentally perjure himself. Lacking evidence, the Navy was forced to let him go.

Several of the crew of U-48, including the radio operator, later expressed shock and regret once it became known that the ship had been carrying children. Bleichrodt himself never mentally recovered. The next time he went to sea, he had a mental breakdown and was reassigned to training duties. Several historians have supported the German position, including Kate Tildesley, Curator at the Naval Historical Branch, Ministry of Defence, who wrote "What was not known by Bleichrodt was that the liner he was attacking carried 90 children."

== Culture and media ==
The full story is told in Children of the Benares, A War Crime and its Victims by Ralph Barker, published by Methuen London, 1987.

Elizabeth Hawkins wrote Sea of Peril (Published 1995), a fictional account of a boy being sent aboard Benares; when the ship is torpedoed, he ends up in Lifeboat 12.

The poet George Sutherland Fraser, who served in World War II, wrote a poem, "S.S. City of Benares (drowned refugee children, 1940)", about the sinking.

City of Benares is the setting of the book Wish Me Luck by James Heneghan, the story of a boy from Liverpool being sent away to safety on City of Benares.

The play Lifeboat by Nicola McCartney tells the story of Bess Walder and Beth Cummings, two survivors of City of Benares.

Janet Menzies wrote Children of the Doomed Voyage (Wiley, 2005. ISBN 978-0-470-01887-3). The story tells the events and tragedies that night in the survivors own words, plus their rescuers stories.

Tom Nagorski wrote Miracles on the Water: The Heroic Survivors of a World War II U-Boat Attack (Hyperion Books: New York, 2006. ISBN 1-4013-0871-6) collecting eyewitness accounts about the people and events connected with the attack and sinking of the liner SS City of Benares. His grandfather, a Polish émigré and diplomat, was one of the adult survivors.

There is a memorial to Michael Rennie, an escort who died of exhaustion after rescuing several evacuee children, in the Church of St Jude-on-the-Hill, Hampstead Garden Suburb, London NW11. A painting by Walter P. Starmer represents the last moments in the life of the vicar's son.

An exhibit about the City of Benares disaster is in Sunderland Volunteer Life Brigade Watch House and Museum.

The sinking reportedly inspired actress and inventor Hedy Lamarr to develop and patent a system of spread spectrum radio as a means to guide anti-ship torpedoes. The concept is today the basis of Wi-Fi, Bluetooth, and other communications technology.

The book September 17 by Amanda West Lewis (published 2013), tells the story of three children, Bess Walder, Kenneth Sparks, and Sonia Bech, using real events, but fictional conversations.

The children's book Lifeboat 12, by Susan Hood (published 2018), tells the story of Kenneth Sparks, one of the children who survived from the "forgotten" Lifeboat 12.

The book Torpedoed: The True Story of the World War II Sinking of "The Children's Ship" by Deborah Heiligman (published 2019) tells the story of many children aboard SS City of Benares and their experience of the sinking and the subsequent night and rescue.

In 2019 the story of 9 year old Audrey Mansfield, who died on City of Benares, featured on the Antiques Roadshow. Expert Bill Harriman was shown a collection of papers related to her voyage and death.

== See also ==
- List of maritime disasters in World War II
- List of ships sunk by submarines by death toll
