= Mark Pritchard (politician) =

British politician

The Right Honourable Mark Pritchard MP
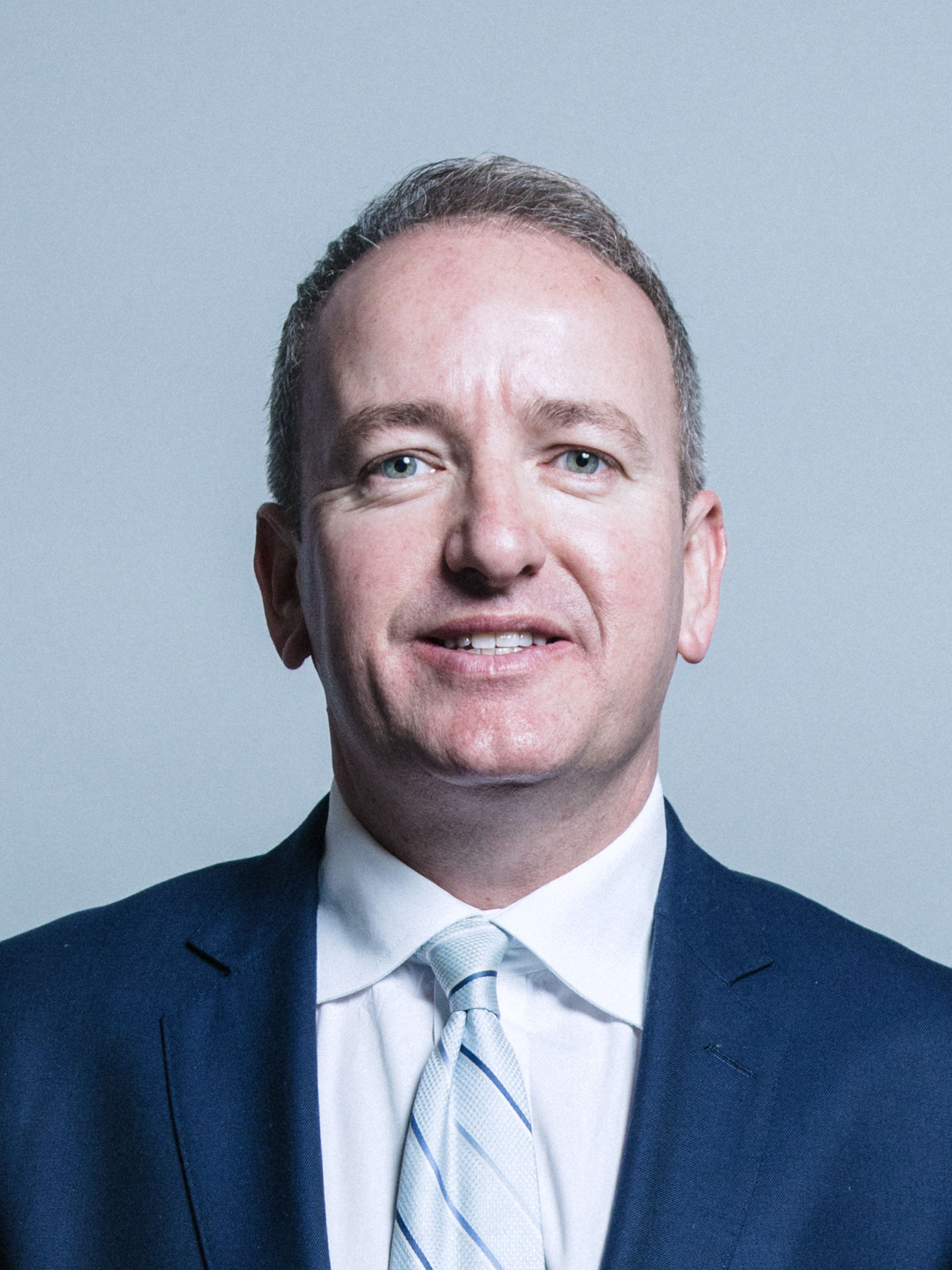
- Official portrait, 2017

Member of Parliament for The Wrekin
- Incumbent
- Assumed office 5 May 2005
- Preceded by: Peter Bradley
- Majority: 883 (1.6%)

Personal details
- Born: 22 November 1966 (age 59)
- Party: Conservative
- Education: London Guildhall University
- Website: markpritchard.com

Mark Andrew Pritchard (born 22 November 1966 and formerly known as Mark Mallon) is a British Conservative Party politician who has been the Member of Parliament (MP) for The Wrekin since 2005.

== Early life and career ==
Mark Pritchard was born on 22 November 1966. He was brought up and educated in Herefordshire. He remarked on BBC Radio 4 that he comes from an "unorthodox background" for a Conservative MP. For the first five years of his life he was brought up in an orphanage in Hereford, and later grew up in foster care, living in a council house. He told his local newspaper that his early years were years of "love and warmth", and that he did not have "a single bad memory" of his time in the orphanage.

Pritchard was first elected for the Conservative Party as a councillor on Harrow Council in London. Under his former name of Mark Mallon, he was elected as the Conservative Party candidate at a by-election for Pinner West ward in January 1993, but lost his seat at the council elections in May 1994, coming fifth.

A supporter of Margaret Thatcher, Pritchard worked as the campaign manager to her successor in Finchley, Hartley Booth, who served in Parliament between 1992 and 1997. Pritchard, under his previous name Mallon, co-wrote a book with Booth on the subject of long-term unemployment and homelessness, which they self-published in 1994, shortly after Booth resigned as a parliamentary private secretary following press revelations of a relationship with a House of Commons researcher.

After working for Hartley Booth, Pritchard spent a brief period at Conservative Central Office, working as a press officer, in the 1997 general election campaign. He went on to set up his own business and was elected as a Conservative councillor in Surrey on Woking Borough Council, for the Brookwood ward, in May 2000. He did not defend his seat at the end of his term in 2004.

== Parliamentary career ==
Pritchard stood as the Conservative candidate in Warley at the 2001 general election, coming second, with 22.8% of the vote, behind the incumbent Labour MP John Spellar.

=== 1st Parliament (2005–2010) ===
At the 2005 general election, Pritchard was elected to Parliament as MP for The Wrekin with 41.9% of the vote and a majority of 942. He was one of 130 candidates who received help from 20,000 countryside campaigners from the Countryside Party who "poured into marginal seats all over Britain" in an attempt to unseat anti-hunting Labour MPs. During the campaign pro-hunt supporters "delivered 3.4 million leaflets, addressed 2.1 million envelopes, put up 55,000 posters and provided 170,000 hours of campaigning". Pritchard was also one of 30 Conservative MPs who benefited from large "below the radar" donations paid to candidates from a secret Conservative Party donors' fund set up by Lord Ashcroft, Lord Steinberg and the Midlands Industrial Council.

Pritchard is known for his advocacy of animal welfare issues and introduced three animal welfare related private Ten Minute Rule Bills in the period 2006–09. These were the Sale of Endangered Animals on the Internet (Prohibition) Bill, 2006; Primates As Pets (Prohibition) Bill, 2007 and the Common Birds (Protection) Bill, 2009.

=== 2nd Parliament (2010–2015) ===
Pritchard was re-elected as MP for The Wrekin at the 2010 general election with an increased vote share of 47.7% and an increased majority of 9,450.

He was joint secretary of the 1922 Committee between 2010 and 2012.

In June 2011 he successfully moved a motion to ban wild animals in circuses. In the House of Commons he stated that he had been placed under pressure by the prime minister to withdraw the motion, first by being offered a job, and then by being threatened.

Pritchard is a Eurosceptic, defining himself in October 2011 as a "mainstream Eurosceptic". He was one of the "Tory Rebels" who oversaw the largest post-war defeat of any Conservative government concerning a European Referendum. Also in October 2011, he called for an "in/out referendum" on the European Union. Central to Pritchard's argument was that "The majority of Britons living today have never had a say on Europe", with Pritchard referring to this group as "the great disenfranchised".

In March 2012, Pritchard had a public confrontation with John Bercow, the Speaker of the House of Commons, who had told him to stand aside in a corridor. Pritchard then told him, "You are not fucking royalty, Mr Speaker!"

Pritchard was appointed by Prime Minister David Cameron as a member of the Joint Committee on the National Security Strategy from 2010 to 2015.

Pritchard was appointed to the post of deputy chairman of the Conservative Party's International Office in 2010 but resigned in January 2012 over policy differences on: "a lack of national and individual aspiration, immigration, and Europe" – what some commentators called "the Holy Trinity of the Conservative right".

Pritchard supported the motion calling for a "real terms cut" in the EU's multi-annual budget in October 2012. He was joined by fellow Eurosceptic MP, Mark Reckless, to draft the so-called 'Reckless-Pritchard amendment' which saw David Cameron's government defeated over the issue. Pritchard said that the vote would "strengthen David Cameron's hand in Brussels".

In November 2013, Pritchard was subject to a series of articles in The Daily Telegraph regarding revelations from undercover investigations that he had offered to use his political contacts to set up business deals with foreign officials and ministers in return for being paid hundreds of thousands of pounds. Following the revelations Pritchard referred himself to the Standards Commissioner, Kathryn Hudson, who subsequently announced that she would not investigate Pritchard, because there was "insufficient evidence", although the Daily Telegraph protested that the Commissioner failed to contact the newspaper for its evidence. Pritchard maintained that he had not broken the Code of Conduct and that his business contacts were unconnected to his parliamentary work.

In December 2014, he was arrested and later bailed over an allegation of rape. On 6 January 2015, the police inquiry was dropped on the basis that there was insufficient evidence for a case to proceed. Pritchard urged a review of the law on anonymity for people accused of rape, saying that it was unfair that he was publicly identified whilst his accuser remained anonymous.

=== 3rd Parliament (2015–2017) ===
At the 2015 general election, Pritchard was again re-elected with an increased vote share of 49.7% and an increased majority of 10,743.

Although a eurosceptic, Pritchard supported the position of the leader of his party and campaigned for the United Kingdom to remain in the European Union at the 2016 Brexit referendum. He set out a number of security and foreign policy concerns in an article in The Sunday Times.

In January 2017, it was reported that an inquiry had been launched into all-party parliamentary groups amid concerns they were being used to bypass lobbying rules. Pritchard was singled out in reports as the parliamentarian who sits on the most APPGs, with membership of 41 separate groups.

=== 4th Parliament (2017–2019) ===
Pritchard was again re-elected at the snap 2017 general election, with an increased vote share of 55.4% and a decreased majority of 9,564.

Pritchard has served on several select committees: Transport, Works & Pensions, Wales, and Environmental Audit. He is chairman or vice-chairman of several all-party parliamentary groups, including the ASEAN region, and Africa. Pritchard is also an executive member of the British Parliamentary Group. In 2015, Pritchard succeeded Michael Connarty as the joint-chairman of the All Party Parliamentary Jazz Appreciation Group.

In March 2018, he was one of three MPs accused of using threatening and intimidating behaviour towards parliamentary clerks. An investigation by the BBC claimed Pritchard used foul language in an exchange with a clerk and was known for having a bad temper. He responded that "there was no truth in the claims whatsoever", saying that he never used foul language and had never had a complaint levelled against him.

=== 5th Parliament (2019–2024) ===
At the 2019 general election, Pritchard was again re-elected, with an increased vote share of 63.5% and an increased majority of 18,726.

In July 2020 he was appointed to Parliament's Intelligence and Security Committee.

In February 2021 he was appointed by Her Majesty Queen Elizabeth II to the Privy Council.

In 2022 it was reported Pritchard earned £325 an hour as an advisor to Linden Energy holdings, an organisation which promotes the belief that climate change is inevitable and mitigation is pointless. Mark Maslin, professor of Earth system science at University College London claims Linden Energy is a classic climate change denier. Prichard was criticised by the Green Party in July 2022 for taking up the role and delaying his entry in the registry of interest by 2 months.

=== 6th Parliament (2024–) ===
At the 2024 general election, Pritchard was again re-elected, with a decreased vote share of 32.6 per cent and a reduced majority of 883.

== Personal life ==
In July 2013, Mark Pritchard announced that he was divorcing his wife of 15 years, Sondra, following their separation in April 2013.

Pritchard previously employed his wife as his Office Manager on a salary up to £45,000. The practice of MPs employing family members has been criticised by some sections of the media on the lines that it promotes nepotism.

Pritchard has several business interests outside politics, with commitments to some 44 hours of non-parliamentary duties each month. One of these commitments is working for a Macedonian arms manufacturer, the ATS Group.

Parliament of the United Kingdom
Preceded by Peter Bradley	Member of Parliament for The Wrekin; 2005–present	Incumbent
