= Gerry Fowler =

British Labour Party politician and university academic

Minister of State for Education and Science
- In office 1969–1970
- Prime Minister: Harold Wilson

Minister of State for the Privy Council Office
- In office 18 October 1974 – 23 January 1976
- Preceded by: Position established
- Succeeded by: The Lord Crowther-Hunt

Member of Parliament for The Wrekin
- In office 28 February 1974 – 7 April 1979
- Preceded by: Anthony Trafford
- Succeeded by: Warren Hawksley
- In office 31 March 1966 – 29 May 1970
- Preceded by: William Yates
- Succeeded by: Anthony Trafford

Personal details
- Born: Gerald Teasdale Fowler; 1 January 1935
- Died: 1 May 1993 (aged 58)
- Party: Labour

Gerald Teasdale Fowler (1 January 1935 – 1 May 1993), commonly known as Gerry Fowler, was a British Labour Party politician and university academic.

== Early life and education ==
Fowler was the son of James A. Fowler (died 1964) of Long Buckby, Northamptonshire, and his wife Alfreda.

Fowler was educated at Northampton Grammar School (where he was a friend of Bernard Donoughue), Lincoln College, Oxford, and Frankfurt University.

== Academic career ==
Fowler had an extensive career in university education outside parliament. He was a lecturer in classics at Lancaster University, from 1964 to 1966 until he entered the House of Commons in 1966. He was assistant director of Huddersfield Polytechnic from 1970 to 1972, visiting professor at the University of Strathclyde from 1970 to 1974, Professor of Educational Studies at the Open University from 1972 to 1974, associate professor of government at Brunel University from 1977 to 1980, then deputy director of Preston Polytechnic from 1980 to 1981. Ultimately he was rector of the Polytechnic of East London from 1982 to 1992.

== Political career ==
He was a councillor on Oxford City Council 1960–64, branch secretary of the Oxford branch of ASSET and a visiting lecturer at Lancaster University 1964–1966.

Fowler contested Banbury at the 1964 general election. At the 1966 general election, he was elected as Member of Parliament for the marginal seat of The Wrekin, with a majority of 846 votes and poster slogan of "follow Fowler" but lost it at the 1970 election to the Conservative candidate Anthony ('Tony') Trafford. He regained his seat at the next opportunity in February 1974 and held it in October 1974. However, at the 1979 general election he was defeated again, this time by the Conservative Warren Hawksley.

After two years as a Parliamentary Secretary at the Ministry of Technology, Fowler was the Minister of State for Education and Science from 1969 to 1970. He was there again for spells in 1974 and 1976, in between which times he was Minister of State for the Privy Council Office from 1974 to 1976.

Fowler, who lived in Wellington, Shropshire within his constituency, also served in local government in the area as a member of Wrekin District Council, from 1973 to 1976, serving as the council's leader in 1973–74, and also sat in Shropshire County Council from 1979 to 1985.

== Personal life ==
He was twice married. Firstly in 1968 to Julie, daughter of Wilfrid Brining of Slough, and secondly in 1982 to Lorna, daughter of William Lloyd, of Preston, Lancashire.

Fowler died of cancer at his home in Regent's Park, London, on 1 May (coincidentally Labour Day) 1993 aged 58, and was cremated at Golders Green Crematorium.

Parliament of the United Kingdom
Preceded by William Yates	Member of Parliament for The Wrekin; 1966–1970	Succeeded by Anthony Trafford
Preceded by Anthony Trafford	Member of Parliament for The Wrekin; Feb 1974–1979	Succeeded by Warren Hawksley
