= William Yates (politician) =

Australian and British politician

Member of the Australian Parliament for Holt
- In office 13 December 1975 – 18 October 1980
- Preceded by: Max Oldmeadow
- Succeeded by: Michael Duffy

Member of Parliament for The Wrekin
- In office 26 May 1955 – 10 March 1966
- Preceded by: Ivor Owen Thomas
- Succeeded by: Gerry Fowler

Personal details
- Born: 15 September 1921
- Died: 18 April 2010 (aged 88) Tallangatta, Victoria
- Party: Conservative Party (UK); Liberal Party of Australia
- Occupation: Soldier

William Yates (15 September 1921 – 18 April 2010) was a British Conservative politician and later an Australian Liberal politician. He was one of several to have served in both the UK and Australian parliaments.

== Early life ==
William Yates was born in 1921, son of William Yates and Mrs. John T. Renshaw of Appleby, Westmorland and educated at Uppingham School and Hertford College, Oxford.

== Military service ==
He entered the 2nd Dragoon Guards (Queen's Bays) early in 1942 during the Second World War, and served through the war in North Africa and Italy, gaining rank of captain in 1946. He lost a leg at the knee at the First Battle of El Alamein and became one of the first soldiers given penicillin. He postwar served with the Territorial Army attached to the Warwickshire Yeomanry in 1950, and in the Shropshire Yeomanry from 1956 to 1967.

== Diplomatic and political career ==
Yates served in the Foreign Office in the Middle East, working in military intelligence in the Suez Canal Zone. He lived briefly in Lebanon.

In 1955 he was elected to the House of Commons for the Conservative Party in the marginal seat of The Wrekin, being re-elected in the subsequent 1959 and 1964 general elections.

During the 1956 Suez Crisis Yates emerged as one of the government's staunchest critics. On 1 November 1956, Yates interrupted on a point of order and said, "I have come to the conclusion that Her Majesty's Government has been involved in an international conspiracy". Later that day, representatives from the United States and the Soviet Union at the United Nations joined forces and demanded a cease-fire as the secret alliance between Britain, France and Israel known as the Protocol of Sèvres was revealed. Ultimately the exposure led to the downfall of the Prime Minister Anthony Eden.

Yates was defeated by the Labour Party in the 1966 General Election. The following year he left the Conservative Party after his constituency party terminated his candidacy due to comments he made about the Arab-Israeli War.

A senior partner in World Wide Industrial Consultants, Yates moved to Australia in late 1967. From 1969 to 1975 he was a senior schoolmaster at Brighton Grammar School, Melbourne teaching French and history (often attending classes as the only master wearing a bow-tie). At the 1975 election he was elected as a Liberal Member of the House of Representatives, representing the Victorian seat of Holt. He was defeated at the 1980 election by the Australian Labor Party candidate. In 1981 he worked in an administrative position in the finance industry.

He went on to spend over a year (26 May 1982 – 9 August 1983) as Administrator of the Australian territory of Christmas Island.

In 2003, at the age of 82, he earned a Doctorate in Political Science from the University of Melbourne following publication of his thesis on British policy during the Suez crisis.

== Personal life ==
On 14 September 1946 Yates married the Honourable Rosemary Elton, the daughter of historian Godfrey Elton, 1st Baron Elton; they had one son, William (born 7 October 1951) and two daughters, Elisabeth (born 30 June 1948) and Angela (born 7 April 1950). The couple divorced in 1955. Yates then married Camilla Rosemary, daughter of Ernest and Eleonora Tennant, of Orford House, Ugley, near Bishop's Stortford, Hertfordshire and had four sons: Tom, Peter, Oliver and Mark. Yates died in 2010, aged 88.

Parliament of the United Kingdom
Preceded by Ivor Owen Thomas	Member of Parliament for The Wrekin; 1955–1966	Succeeded by Gerry Fowler
Parliament of Australia
Preceded by Max Oldmeadow	Member for Holt; 1975–1980	Succeeded by Michael Duffy
