= Ivor Owen Thomas =

British politician (1898–1982)

Member of Parliament for The Wrekin
- In office 5 July 1945 – 6 May 1955
- Preceded by: Arthur Colegate
- Succeeded by: William Yates

Personal details
- Born: 5 December 1898
- Died: 11 January 1982 (aged 83)
- Party: Labour

Ivor Owen Thomas (5 December 1898 – 11 January 1982) was a British trade unionist and Labour Party politician.

Thomas was the son of Benjamin L. Thomas from Briton Ferry in South Wales. He was educated at Vernon Place School in Briton Ferry. He was employed as a barber's lather boy, and then at Gwalia Tinplate Works from 1912 to 1918, when he was called up for WW1 military service. As a conscientious objector, he refused, and spent a year in prison. Thomas was an engine cleaner on the Great Western Railway from 1919 to 1923. He won a scholarship to the Central Labour College in London, where he studied from 1923 to 1925, then worked at the head office of the National Union of Railwaymen until 1945.

Thomas was a Labour Party councillor on Battersea Metropolitan Borough Council from 1928 or 1929 to 1945. At the 1945 general election he was elected as the Member of Parliament (MP) for The Wrekin in Shropshire. He was re-elected in 1950 and 1951, holding the seat until defeat, by 478 votes, at the 1955 general election in favour of the Conservative William Yates.

He then returned to work at the NUR headquarters until 1958, and worked for British Rail at London Waterloo station from 1960 to 1965.

There is a road named after him in the village of St Georges, situated in Telford (formerly the Wrekin constituency). (Ivor Thomas Road, St George's, Telford, TF2 9EZ, q.v., Google Maps)

== Personal life ==
In 1929, Thomas married Beatrice Davis, daughter of William Davis. They had one daughter.

Beatrice died in 1978, and Thomas died in 1982, aged 83.

Parliament of the United Kingdom
Preceded by Arthur Colegate	Member of Parliament for The Wrekin; 1945 – 1955	Succeeded by William Yates
