= Fownhope =

Village in Herefordshire, England

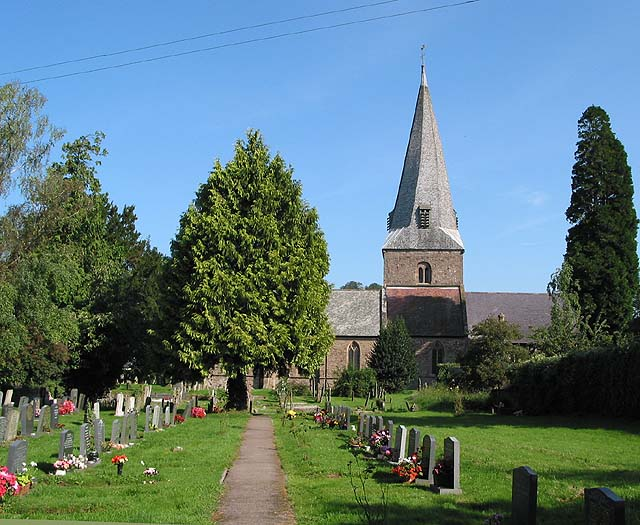
- St. Mary's Parish Church, Fownhope

- Location within Herefordshire
- Population: 999 (2011 census)
- OS grid reference: SO578345
- Civil parish: Fownhope
- Unitary authority: Herefordshire
- Shire county: Herefordshire
- Region: West Midlands
- Country: England
- Sovereign state: United Kingdom
- Post town: Hereford
- Postcode district: HR1
- Police: West Mercia
- Fire: Hereford and Worcester
- Ambulance: West Midlands
- UK Parliament: Hereford and South Hereford

Fownhope /ˈfaʊnˌhoʊp/ is a village and civil parish in Herefordshire, England, an area of outstanding natural beauty on the banks of the River Wye. The population of the village at the 2011 census was 999.

== History ==
The earliest known reference to the village comes from the Domesday Book in 1086, where it is called simply Hope, from Old English hop (dative hope), "small, enclosed valley". Its name was lengthened to distinguish it from neighbouring Woolhope, which was also called Hope at the time of the Domesday Book. Early spellings of the village's name include Faghehop (1242), Fanne Hope (1243), Fawehope (1269), Fowehope (1275), Fonhope (1278), and Fowenhop (1315). The name is believed to come from late Old English *Faganhop ("Faga's valley"), from a personal name *Faga (genitive *Fagan), from Old English fag, "coloured, variegated", although no such personal name is attested.

== Landmarks ==
The village has a church, St. Mary's Parish Church; primary school, St. Mary's C of E Primary School; medical centre, Fownhope Medical Centre; two pubs, the Green Man and the New Inn; two hotels, Bowen's Bed & Breakfast and Ferry Lane Bed & Breakfast (both of which are bed and breakfast hotels); a fitness/leisure centre, Wye Leisure and butchers, John A Pritchard & Son. There is a village hall and a recreation/sports field and pavilion, both of which are well used by the many clubs and societies in the village, and in the centre is the village Fire Station. On the northern outskirts of the village, towards Hereford, the Lucksall campsite is situated on the river by the Holme Lacy bridge. It is owned by Sir Eli Cartwright whose family owned most of Hereford in the 19th century.

There are many small quarries and lime kilns scattered through the area, and the remains of an Iron Age hill fort on Capler Hill.

== Fownhope Heart of Oak Society ==
The village maintains a strong identity and the Heart of Oak society, an old friendly society, holds a number of events during the year including the annual Heart of Oak Club walk, where villagers, young and old, process through the streets with sticks decorated with elaborate flower decorations behind a local silver band, stopping off at houses along the way for drinks, including the cider made from local apples. The Heart of Oak society also holds the annual fireworks display and bonfire night on the recreation field.
