= Arthur Colegate =

British politician

Sir Arthur Colegate

Member of Parliament for Burton
- In office 23 February 1950 – 6 May 1955
- Preceded by: Arthur W. Lyne
- Succeeded by: John Jennings

Member of Parliament for The Wrekin
- In office 26 September 1941 – 15 June 1945
- Preceded by: James Baldwin-Webb
- Succeeded by: Ivor Owen Thomas

Personal details
- Born: William Arthur Colegate; 1884 London, England
- Died: 10 September 1956 (aged 71-72)
- Party: Conservative

Sir William Arthur Colegate (1884 – 10 September 1956) was a British Conservative Party politician who served in the House of Commons as a Member of Parliament (MP) from 1941 to 1945 and from 1950 to 1955.

== Biography ==
Colegate was born in Walworth, London, the son of Robert Colegate and Sarah Elizabeth Pearce. He was educated privately before he entered University College London, where he joined the Fabian Society and acted as a research assistant to Beatrice and Sydney Webb. He earned a Bachelor of Science degree in engineering in 1904. He then became a civil servant when he entered the Board of Trade in 1910, before moving into business. He enlisted in the army during the First World War, but the Board of Trade seconded him for special service during the war.

He was a director of Brunner Mond and Company until 1927 (following their amalgamation into ICI) and British Overseas Stores and was chairman of W.G. Allen & Sons (Tipton) Ltd and of the Wright Saddle Company. From 1925 to 1929, he served as President of the Industrial Property Committee of the International Chamber of Commerce, was a Governor of Harper Adams Agricultural College from 1941 to 1947, and President of the Rural District Councils Association.

Abandoning his youthful ideology, Colegate joined the Conservative Party and unsuccessfully contested the Sowerby constituency at the 1929 general election, but he was elected for The Wrekin at a by-election in September 1941, following the death at sea of James Baldwin-Webb. He lost the seat at the 1945 general election, but was successful in Burton, (where he had been adopted as candidate in 1947), at the 1950 general election, holding his seat in 1951, and standing down at the 1955 general election, the same year that he was knighted.

== Personal life ==
On 22 November 1917, Colegate married Winifred Mary Pemberton, daughter of Sir William Worsley, 3rd Baronet, and widow of Captain Francis Percy Campbell Pemberton of the 2nd Life Guards who had been killed in action in the First World War in 1914. The couple had four daughters, one of whom was the writer Isabel Colegate. His wife predeceased him in 1955.

== Estates ==
Besides in London, Colegate had homes at Redbourne Hall near Gainsborough, Lincolnshire and Church Aston Manor near Newport, Shropshire in 1945 and at the time of his death lived at Bembridge, Isle of Wight.

Parliament of the United Kingdom
Preceded by James Baldwin-Webb	Member of Parliament for The Wrekin; 1941–1945	Succeeded by Ivor Owen Thomas
Preceded by Arthur W. Lyne	Member of Parliament for Burton; 1950–1955	Succeeded by John Jennings
