= Thomas Oakley (British politician) =

British electrician and politician

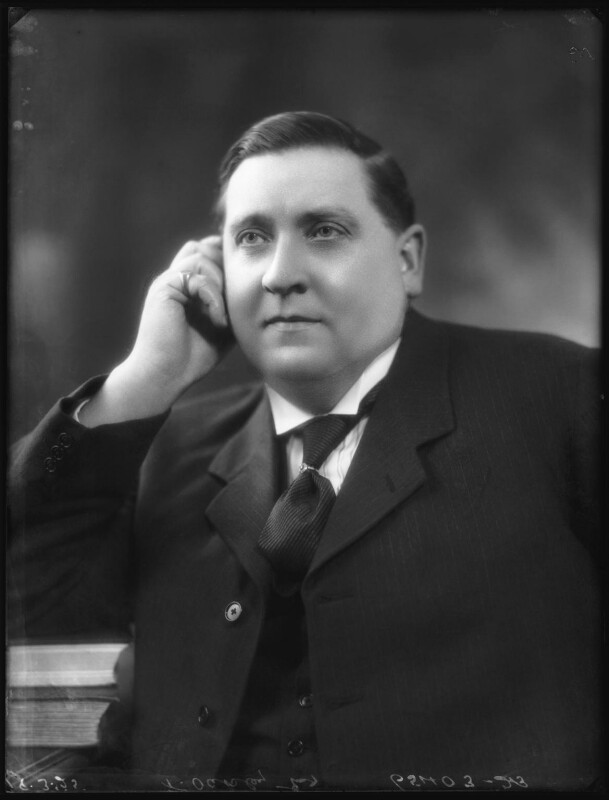
- Oakley in 1925

Member of Parliament for The Wrekin
- In office 29 October 1924 – 10 May 1929
- Preceded by: Henry Nixon
- Succeeded by: Edith Picton-Turbervill

Personal details
- Born: 1879
- Died: 4 April 1936 (aged 56-57)
- Party: Conservative

Thomas Oakley (1879 – 4 April 1936) was a British electrician and politician. He became a prominent working-class Conservative in St Pancras, and later served a single term in Parliament representing The Wrekin constituency. An energetic man, he devoted much of his time to work with the Hearts of Oak Benefit Society, a friendly society. In politics he campaigned for the abolition of betting duty and against the creation of the Horserace Totalisator Board.

== Early life ==
Oakley was born in Prees, and brought up in Fauls near Whitchurch where his family had lived for several generations. However he left his native village early and found a job as a billiard ball marker at Shrewsbury. In 1900 he found a job with the London and North Western Railway, for whom he worked in Crewe and later as an electrician at the London and North-Western Hotel at Euston.

== St Pancras municipal politics ==
Moving to London, Oakley became involved in municipal politics in the Metropolitan Borough of St Pancras. In 1912 he stood as a Municipal Reform candidate for the borough council in ward no. 6 (which included Somers Town, together with King's Cross and St Pancras stations); he was defeated with 112 votes behind the lowest winning candidate. Later that year he was elected to St Pancras Board of guardians, and after re-election in 1919 he served as chairman of the board in 1921–22. Oakley again failed to be elected as St Pancras borough councillor for ward no. 6 in the 1919 elections.

=== Hearts of Oak ===
Oakley became heavily involved in the Hearts of Oak Benefit Society, a large friendly society operating nationwide but based on the Euston Road. He was elected to its Executive Council and served on the Finance and Investment Committee (of which he became chairman). In 1920 he was Chairman of the Executive Council. His experience with the Hearts of Oak led him to become a Fellow of the Faculty of Insurance, and he also served as a member of the National Congress of Friendly Societies; he was appointed by the Minister of Health as a member of the Consultative Council on National Health Insurance.

== The Wrekin ==
At the 1924 general election, Oakley was selected as the Conservative candidate for The Wrekin constituency in his native Shropshire. The seat was held by Labour, but Oakley challenged as a working man using his own life experiences to oppose Labour policies. While on his way to a campaign meeting at Oakengates during the campaign, Oakley saw his Labour opponent's car which had gone off the road and ended in a ditch; he gave his opponent a lift to his meeting before going along to his own meeting at which he arrived late and was booed by the crowd. Oakley explained why he was late and then invited the crowd to "Now get on with your booing". Oakley was successful at the polls, winning a majority of 2,878 over the sitting Labour MP.

== Parliament ==
Oakley's Parliamentary contributions concentrated on issues affecting Friendly Societies and national insurance. In June 1925 he pressed the Minister for Health to intervene in the case of a man in Ferndale, Glamorgan who was incapacitated from work but was awarded much less in outdoor relief than the national scale indicated; the Minister refused to intervene in the local decision. He was unanimously elected President of the Hearts of Oak society in May 1926, and served as Parliamentary Agent to the society during his time as an MP.

=== Betting ===
He took up the cause of abolition of betting duty and in December 1926 presided at meetings in Liverpool and Manchester organised by the Betting Duty Reform Association at which many representatives connected with horse racing spoke. Speaking in March 1927 Oakley made it clear that he regarded the introduction of betting duty in the 1926 budget as being mistaken, and declared that he was not ashamed of trying to put his party right on the subject. In 1927 Oakley declared himself a supporter of the proposed reform of the House of Lords proposed by Viscount Cave.

It was not until March 1928 that Oakley made his first full speech in the House of Commons, opposing the Racecourse Betting Bill which established the Horserace Totalisator Board. He objected to the Bill on the grounds that it created a monopoly and placed betting under the control of the Jockey Club and the National Hunt Committee. Oakley was in a minority of Conservatives in opposing the Bill on a free vote, and was unsuccessful in his opposition to the Bill. After the debate, Oakley apologised to Lord Hamilton of Dalzell for an inaccuracy in his speech concerning admission fees to the racecourses owned by the club.

== Defeat ==
With a narrow majority, The Wrekin was targeted by the Labour Party at the 1929 general election. Labour Party leader Ramsay MacDonald spoke in the division attacking David Lloyd George's plan for dealing with unemployment at the end of March, shortly before the campaign opened. At the election, a Liberal candidate stood for the first time since 1920. Oakley was hopeful that the workers of the district had fallen out of sympathy with the Labour Party since the general strike of 1926, and that trade union membership had fallen. However the constituency included mining (some mines had closed), and the iron and steel industry imported their raw materials and were strongly opposed to protectionism. A competitive election was forecast. In line with the national swing, Oakley was defeated by 2,862 votes.

== Later life ==
In the fortnight after the election, Oakley was elected once again as Chairman of the Executive Committee of the Hearts of Oak Benefit Society. In September 1931 he was elected as Parliamentary Agent to the National Conference of Friendly Societies. As its Parliamentary Agent, Oakley reported back to the Hearts of Oak society's conference in 1934 that the society's pressure on the Chancellor of the Exchequer to protect friendly society benefits in law had been effective, and that payments from friendly societies would be disregarded when applying the means test. Always a highly active man, he remained active in election work. Oakley worked so heavily on campaigning in the 1935 general election that he became ill, and eventually died the following spring.

Parliament of the United Kingdom
Preceded by Henry Nixon	Member of Parliament for The Wrekin; 1924 – 1929	Succeeded by Edith Picton-Turbervill
