= James Baldwin-Webb =

British Army officer, businessman, and politician

Member of Parliament for The Wrekin
- In office 27 October 1931 – 17 September 1940
- Preceded by: Edith Picton-Turbervill
- Succeeded by: Arthur Colegate

Personal details
- Born: 5 February 1894 Remenham, Berkshire, England
- Died: 17 September 1940 (aged 46)
- Party: Conservative

Colonel James Baldwin-Webb TD (5 February 1894 – 17 September 1940) was a British Army officer, businessman, and Conservative Party politician who served in the House of Commons as a Member of Parliament (MP) for The Wrekin from 1931 to his death at sea in 1940.

== Family background ==
He was born in Remenham, Berkshire, the only son of James Bertram Webb and his wife Elizabeth Anne Baldwin, of Wylde Green, Sutton Coldfield, Warwickshire. He was educated privately.

== Business career ==
After leaving school, Baldwin-Webb worked in his maternal grandmother's family firm of Messrs Baldwin's(Birmingham) Ltd, then a firm of hardware merchants. He then joined the local staff of Lloyds Bank in Birmingham, where he passed all major banking examinations, but left the company when he joined the army at the outbreak of World War I in August 1914.

After the war, he returned to Baldwin's and worked as a representative, later becoming managing director. He was credited with guiding the firm in the 1920s to diversify into a major builders' merchants.

He later became a member of two City of London livery companies, the Worshipful Company of Coachmakers and Coach Harness Makers and of Pattenmakers.

== Military career ==
At the outbreak of World War I, Baldwin-Webb enlisted in a Territorial Army (TA) unit, the 46th North Midland Divisional Train of the Royal Army Service Corps (RASC), becoming a commissioned officer in a few weeks.

From 1915 he served on the Western Front, took part in the Battle of the Somme attached to an artillery trench mortar battery, and later served on the staff of the Third and Fourth Armies of the British Expeditionary Force. As a result of his service in France, he was created a Chevalier of the Ordre du Mérite Agricole by the French Government in 1919.

After the war he continued to serve, part-time, with the Train and rose to lieutenant-colonel in its command, from 1925 to 1931. He was promoted full colonel in February 1932, and awarded the TD in 1934. In 1939 he was appointed Honorary Colonel of the 4th Anti-Aircraft Division R.A.S.C.

== Political career ==
Baldwin-Webb was elected a member of Birmingham City Council in 1925 and served until his death, at one point chairing its Highways Committee.

He was elected as MP for The Wrekin at the General Election of October 1931, taking it from a Labour Member, Edith Picton-Turbervill, and held it at the 1935 general election.

It was a time of depression and at his maiden speech in the House of Commons, he moved a motion to urge the National Government of Ramsay MacDonald to help create employment by a progressive policy of carrying out public works where there was greatest need. He also gained concessions on unemployment insurance for workers in the sugar beet industry, one of the constituency's main seasonal employers. He was described by an unnamed source as "the best commercial traveller the Wrekin division has ever had" for his mainly successful efforts to gain orders for local industries.

He also became well known for organizing what became known as the "Baldwin-Webb trips" to London and seaside towns for the pleasure of constituents and to advertise the Wrekin area's industries. They attracted between 5,000 and 7,000 day trippers a year.

He was also appointed as a Deputy Lieutenant of Staffordshire in 1932.

== Death ==
Although Baldwin-Webb did not see active service after the outbreak of World War II, continuing to appear in Parliament, he later became honorary secretary of the British Volunteer Ambulance Corps (originally called the Anglo-French Ambulance Corps). It was on a voyage to Canada to fund-raise for the Corps that he lost his life, as he was drowned when the SS City of Benares was torpedoed and sunk in the North Atlantic by a German submarine. Ernest Szekulesz, a Hungarian journalist who survived, recalled that Baldwin-Webb helped women and children into the lifeboats, especially one in particular, Lifeboat 6. Baldwin-Webb managed to persuade the wife of Rudolf Olden, Ika Olden, to leave the ship without her husband. He also persuaded another reluctant woman, Anne Fleetwood-Hesketh, mother of Roger Fleetwood-Hesketh, to enter this lifeboat as well. Fleetwood-Hesketh, had insisted that the children go first, but after some time she reluctantly stepped into Lifeboat 6. Tragically, both women died when the Lifeboat tipped. German Nazi propagandists later claimed that he and Olden were sailing on a British government mission to persuade the then-neutral United States to enter the war.) Ernest Szekulesz, Anthony Quinton and his mother, and Monkia Lanyi already grieving the loss of her husband, watched Baldwin-Webb leap from the deck, some forty or fifty feet above them, landing in the water. The sound of the man splashing into the sea was later described as "the slap of an oar." Anthony Quinton thought he saw Baldwin-Webb smile, before he fell unmoving in lifeless in the water. He was unmarried.

He is commemorated in the House of Commons chamber by a heraldic shield.

A road, Baldwin-Webb Avenue, in Donnington, Telford in Shropshire, is named after him.

Parliament of the United Kingdom
Preceded by Edith Picton-Turbervill	Member of Parliament for The Wrekin; 1931 – 1941	Succeeded by Arthur Colegate
