= Anthony Trafford, Baron Trafford =

British Conservative Party politician and physician

The Right Honourable The Lord Trafford of Falmer FRCP

Member of Parliament for The Wrekin
- In office 18 June 1970 – 8 February 1974
- Preceded by: Gerald Fowler
- Succeeded by: Gerald Fowler

Member of the House of Lords Lord Temporal
- In office 3 April 1987 – 16 September 1989; Life Peerage

Personal details
- Born: 20 July 1932
- Died: 16 September 1989 (aged 57)
- Party: Conservative

Joseph Anthony Porteous Trafford, Baron Trafford of Falmer, FRCP (20 July 1932 – 16 September 1989) was a British Conservative Party politician and physician. He was usually known as Anthony Trafford, sometimes shortened to "Tony".

Trafford was son of physician Harold Trafford of Warlingham, Surrey. In 1960 he married Helen Elizabeth, later styled The Lady Trafford of Falmer, daughter of Albert Ralph Chalk of Cambridge. He made his home in Hove, Sussex. Lord and Lady Trafford had a son and a daughter.

- Hon. Mark Russell Trafford KC (b. 1966)
- Hon. Tanya Helen Trafford (b. 1968)

He was educated at St Edmund's School, Hindhead, Charterhouse, Lincoln's Inn, the University of London and Guy's Hospital Medical School where he won the gold medal, graduated as Bachelor of Medicine and Bachelor of Surgery with Honours in 1957 and gained membership of the Royal College of Physicians in 1961 before attending Johns Hopkins University in Baltimore as a Fellow in Medicine and a Fulbright Scholar.

He returned to England to take up appointment as Senior Registrar at Guy's Hospital in 1963, then became consultant physician at the Royal Sussex County Hospital in 1965, where he also became director of its artificial kidney unit. He was also director of a private banking company and became Pro-Chancellor of the University of Sussex.

At the 1970 general election, he was elected as the member of parliament (MP) for the marginal seat of The Wrekin, but lost his seat in the February 1974 general election to Labour Party candidate Gerald Fowler, whom he had defeated in 1970.

Trafford was on hospital duty at the time of the Brighton hotel bombing of the Conservative Party conference in 1984 and had a leading role in treating the casualties who were taken in first instance to the Royal Sussex County Hospital. Trafford was subsequently knighted in 1985 and created a life peer as Baron Trafford, of Falmer in the County of East Sussex on 3 April 1987. Both honours were awarded by Margaret Thatcher. He was appointed as Minister of State for Health in the House of Lords in July 1989, to take charge of government proposals on the Warnock Report on Human Fertilisation.

He died as a patient at the Royal Sussex County Hospital after a short illness of lung cancer in September 1989, aged 57.

Parliament of the United Kingdom
Preceded by Gerry Fowler	Member of Parliament for The Wrekin; 1970–February 1974	Succeeded by Gerry Fowler
