= Howard Button =

British Member of Parliament

Sir Howard Button

Sir Howard Stransom Button MP DL (14 February 1873–18 August 1943) was a Conservative Member of Parliament for The Wrekin. He trained as a lawyer and was an expert in insolvency.

== Life ==
He was born in Uxbridge on 14 February 1873 the son of Alfred Button and his wife Mary Jane Stransom. He had a twin sister Anne Louisa Stransom Button. Another sister was the artist Maud Ireland Button.

He won his seat as an MP in 1922. The Liberals had won at the previous general election, but the Independent Parliamentary Group won it at two by-elections in 1920. He stood down in 1923.

He was Chair of Middlesex County Council from 1933 to 1936, was knighted in 1936, and High Sheriff of Middlesex in 1937 and one of the Sheriffs of the City of London in 1941.

In 1936 he sold the 186 acre Mad Bess Wood to his Council for £28,000. This now forms part of Ruislip Woods.

He was Honorary Colonel of the Finsbury Rifles.

He died on 18 August 1943 aged 70. He is buried in Hillingdon and Uxbridge Cemetery.

== Sources ==
- British Parliamentary Election Results 1918-1949, FWS Craig
- The Constitutional Year Book, 1929
- Whitaker's Almanack, 1923 edition
- "Obituary: Sir Howard Button. Public Life in London and Middlesex". The Times 20 August 1943. p. 8.
- The London Gazette. 19 March 1937. p. 1819.
