= Lilian, Lady Richmond Brown =

English explorer and author

Lilian, Lady Richmond Brown FZS FLS FRGS FRAI
- Born: Lilian Alice Mabel Roussel; 1885; Guernsey, Channel Islands
- Died: 4 October 1946 (aged 60–61); Rye, Sussex, England
- Occupation(s): Explorer, author
- Spouse: Sir Melville Richmond Brown, 3rd Baronet (m. 1906; div. 1930)

Lilian Alice Mabel, Lady Richmond Brown (née Lilian Alice Mabel Roussel) FZS FLS FRGS FRAI (1885 – October 4, 1946) was an English explorer and author.

== Early life ==
Lilian, who was known as "Mabs", was born in 1885. She was a daughter of Robert Roussel who lived at Rohais at Guernsey in the Channel Islands, where she was born.

== Explorer ==
Reportedly after being told she only had a few months to live in the early 1920s, she took up exploring. In spring 1925, Lilian, F. A. Mitchell-Hedges and amateur archaeologist Thomas Gann travelled to the Mayan ruins at Lubaantun in British Honduras (today known as Belize). They obtained relics for the British Museum.

She was appointed a Fellow of the Zoological Society of London, Fellow of the Linnean Society, Fellow of the Royal Geographical Society, and a Fellow of the Royal Anthropological Institute of Great Britain and Ireland.

=== Published works ===
Lady Richmond Brown wrote several articles for magazines and newspapers and, in 1924, published one book, In Unknown Tribes: Uncharted Seas detailing her adventures in the Caribbean and Panama.

== Personal life ==
On 27 February 1906, twenty-one year old Lilian married Melville Richmond Brown (1866–1944), three months before he succeeded his father, Sir William Richmond Brown, 2nd Baronet, as the third baronet. The wedding took place at the register office at Christchurch, Hampshire and they lived for a time at White Rock, in Brockenhurst. In May 1910, her husband's affairs were place under the control of a guardian, Sir Melville's younger brother Frederick, due to his "lunacy." She filed for judicial separation in 1909, but they were not divorced until November 1930, with her husband's guardian naming Mitchell-Hedges as co-respondent.

Sir Melville, who did not remarry, died on 20 February 1944. Lady Richmond Brown died on October 4, 1946, after several months' illness, at Lodge Playdon, near Rye, Sussex.
