= Sir Melville Richmond Brown, 3rd Baronet =

Sir Melville Brown
- Born: Melville Richmond Brown; 13 October 1866
- Died: 20 February 1944 (aged 77)
- Spouse: Lilian Alice Mabel Roussel (m. 1906)
- Parent(s): Sir William Richmond Brown, 2nd Baronet; Emily Mountsteven
- Relatives: Sir Charles Richmond Brown, 4th Baronet (nephew))

Sir Melville Richmond Brown, 3rd Baronet (13 October 1866 – 20 February 1944) was an English landowner.

== Early life ==
Brown was born on 13 October 1866. He was the eldest son of Sir William Richmond Brown, 2nd Baronet and the former Emily Mountsteven. The family lived at Chesham Place in Belgravia, London, and Astrop Park.

His paternal grandparents were Alexander Brown and Sarah Benedict (née Brown) Brown. Among his extended family were uncles James Clifton Brown, MP for Newbury, and Sir Alexander Brown, Bt, also an MP. His maternal grandparents were Gen. William Thomas Blewett Mountsteven and Emily (née Woodforde) Mountsteven.

== Career ==
Upon the death of his father in 1906, he succeeded as the 3rd Baronet Brown, of Richmond Hill, Lancashire which had been created in 1863 for his great-grandfather William Brown, a prominent merchant and founder of the banking-house of Brown, Shipley & Co.

Brown gained the rank of captain and honorary major in the 3rd (Militia) Battalion, Devonshire Regiment, from which he resigned in February 1903.

== Personal life ==
On 27 February 1906, he married Lilian Alice Mabel Roussel, a daughter of Robert Roussel, three months before he succeeded his father as the third baronet. The wedding took place at the register office at Christchurch, Hampshire and they lived for a time at White Rock, in Brockenhurst. In May 1910, Sir Melville's affairs were place under the control of a guardian, his younger brother Frederick, due to his "lunacy." After being told she only had a few months to live in the early 1920s, she took up exploring. They divorced in November 1930, with Sir Melville naming F. A. Mitchell-Hedges as co-respondent. Lady Richmond Brown had accompanied Mitchell-Hedges on several expeditions to Central America, where they obtained relics for the British Museum.

Sir Melville died on 20 February 1944. As he died without issue, he was succeeded in the baronetcy by his nephew, Charles Frederick Richmond Brown, eldest son of his younger brother Frederick. His former wife died in 1946.

Baronetage of the United Kingdom
Preceded by William Richmond Brown	Baronet (of Richmond Hill); 1906–1944	Succeeded by Charles Frederick Richmond Brown
