= Brown baronets of Richmond Hill (1863) =

The Brown baronetcy, of Richmond Hill in the County Palatine of Lancaster, was created in the Baronetage of the United Kingdom on 24 January 1863 for the merchant and banker William Brown, of Astrop House, Kings Sutton, Northamptonshire. The baronetcy was conferred in honour of his services to the city of Liverpool.

The 2nd Baronet was High Sheriff of Northamptonshire in 1873. The 4th Baronet was a deputy lieutenant of the North Riding of Yorkshire.

== Brown baronets, of Richmond Hill (1863) ==
- Sir William Brown, 1st Baronet (1784–1864)
  - Alexander Brown (1817–1849), only son of the 1st Baronet.
    - James Clifton Brown (1841–1917)
    - Sir Alexander Brown, 1st Baronet (1844–1922)
- Sir William Richmond Brown, 2nd Baronet (1840–1906), eldest son of Alexander Brown and grandson of the 1st Baronet.
  - Frederick Richmond Brown (1868–1933)
- Sir Melville Richmond Brown, 3rd Baronet (1866–1944)
- Sir Charles Frederick Richmond Brown, 4th Baronet (1902–1995), son of Frederick Richmond Brown and grandson of the 2nd Baronet.
- Sir George Francis Richmond Brown, 5th Baronet (born 1938).

The heir apparent to the baronetcy is Sam George Richmond Brown (born 1979), eldest son of the 5th Baronet.

== Extended family ==
James Clifton Brown, second son of Alexander Brown, eldest son of the 1st Baronet, was Member of Parliament for Horsham. He was the father of:

- Howard Clifton Brown, a Brigadier-General in the British Army and Member of Parliament for Newbury;
- Douglas Clifton Brown, 1st Viscount Ruffside, Speaker of the House of Commons.
