= Pigott-Brown baronets =

Extinct baronetcy in the Baronetage of the United Kingdom

The Brown, later Pigott-Brown Baronetcy, of Broome Hall in Capel in the County of Surrey, is a title in the Baronetage of the United Kingdom. It was created on 5 January 1903 for Alexander Hargreaves Brown, Liberal Member of Parliament for Wenlock from 1868 to 1885 and Liberal Unionist Member of Parliament for Wellington from 1885 to 1906. He was the third son of Alexander Brown, eldest son of Sir William Brown, 1st Baronet (see Brown baronets of Richmond Hill (1863)). Brown's eldest son Captain Gordon Hargreaves Brown (died 1914) was killed in action in the First World War.

In 1910 the 1st Baronet had married Edith Ivy, eldest daughter and co-heir of Admiral William Harvey Pigott. She assumed in 1925 the additional surname of Pigott for herself and her issue. Their son, the 2nd Baronet, was killed in action in the Second World War. On the death without issue in 2020 of the latter's only son, the 3rd Baronet, who succeeded in 1942, the baronetcy became extinct.

== Brown, later Pigott-Brown baronets, of Broome Hall (1903) ==
- Sir Alexander Hargreaves Brown, 1st Baronet (1844–1922)
- Sir John Hargreaves Pigott-Brown, 2nd Baronet (1913–1942)
- Sir William Brian Pigott-Brown, 3rd Baronet (1941–2020), left no heir.

== Arms ==
Coat of arms of Brown of Broome Hall
Crest A bear’s paw erased argent, issuant out of a wreath of oak Vert, holding a sinister hand Proper. Escutcheon Gules, a chevron Or between two bears’ paws erased in chief Argent, and four hands conjoined in saltire of the Second in base, on a chief engrailed Gold, an eagle displayed Sable; a crescent for difference. Motto Est concordia fratrum (There is unity among brothers)

Coat of arms of Pigott-Brown baronets
Crest A bear's paw erased Argent issuant out of a wreath of oak Vert holding a sinister hand Proper. Escutcheon QQuarterly, 1st & 4th: Gules, a chevron Or between two bears' paws erased in chief Argent, and four hands conjoined in saltire of the Second in base, a chief engrailed of the Last, thereon an eagle displayed Sable; (for distinction) in the honour point a cross-crosslet of the Third (Brown); 2nd & 3rd Ermine three fusils conjoined in fess Sable (Pigott). Motto Est Concordia Fratrum

== See also ==
- Brown baronets

Baronetage of the United Kingdom
Preceded by Chisholm baronets	Brown baronets of Broome Hall; 5 January 1903	Succeeded by Banbury baronets
