= Our Lady of Kazan =

Holy icon of the Virgin Mary in Kazan Cathedral, Moscow

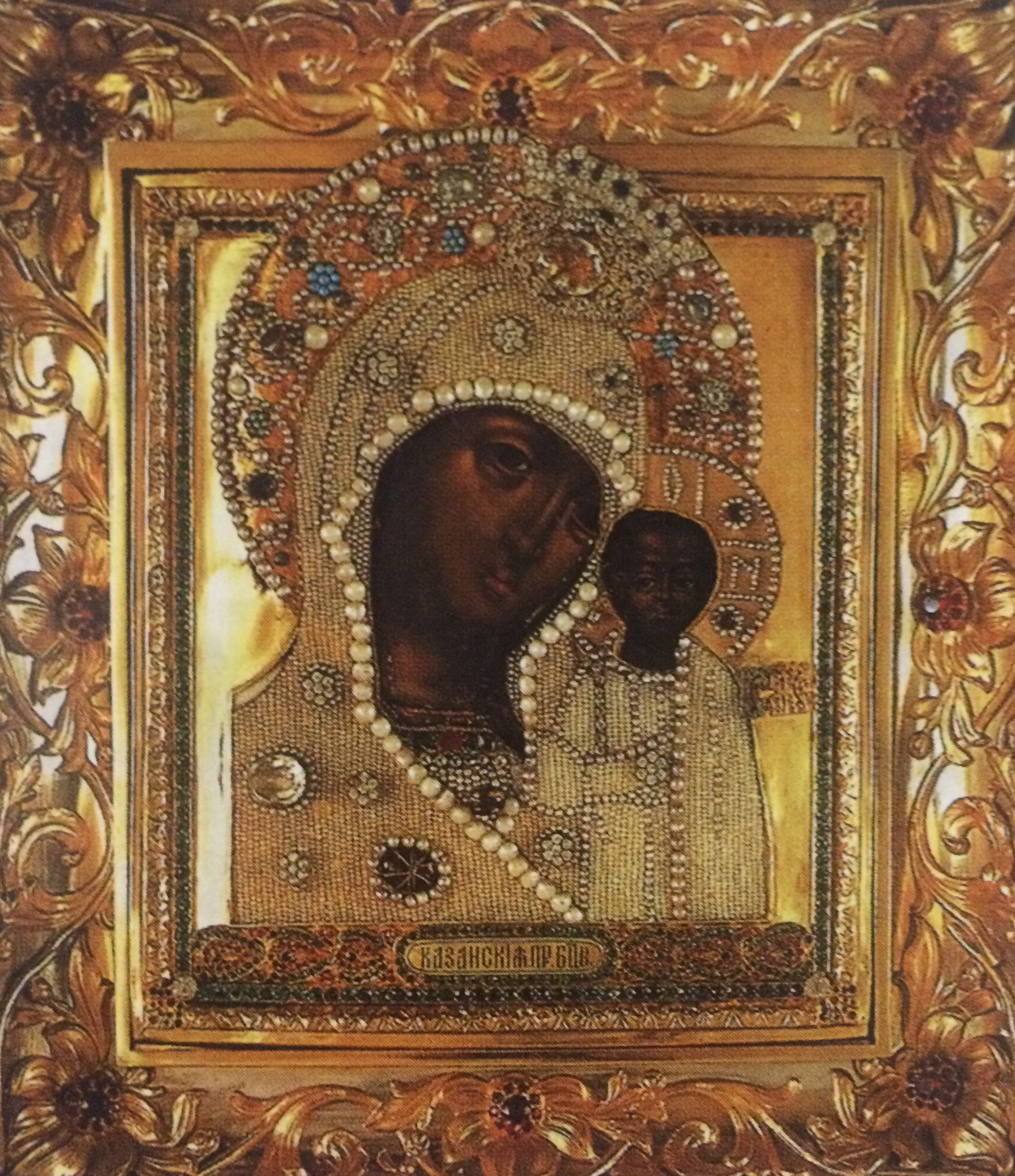
- XVII―XVIII century copy (Yelokhovo Cathedral, Moscow)
- Venerated in: Eastern Orthodoxy (especially Russian Orthodox Church); Catholicism (especially Russian Greek Catholic Church)
- Major shrine: Kazan Mother of God Monastery, Kazan; Kazan Cathedral, Moscow; Yelokhovo Cathedral, Moscow; Kazan Cathedral, Saint Petersburg
- Feast: 8 July (O.S.)/ 21 July (N.S.); 22 October (O.S)/ 4 November (N.S.)

Our Lady of Kazan, also called Mother of God of Kazan (Russian: Казанская Богоматерь, romanized: Kazanskaya Bogomater'), is an icon of the Russian Orthodox Church, representing the Virgin Mary as the protector and patroness of the city of Kazan, and a palladium of all of Russia and Rus'.

According to legend, the icon was originally acquired from Constantinople, lost in 1438, and miraculously recovered in pristine state over 140 years later in 1579. Two major cathedrals, the Kazan Cathedral, Moscow, and the Kazan Cathedral, St. Petersburg, are consecrated to Our Lady of Kazan, and they display copies of the icon, as do numerous churches throughout the land. The original icon in Kazan was stolen, and probably destroyed, in 1904.

The "Vatican copy" is a 16th-century copy of the icon, or possibly the 16th-century original, stolen from St. Petersburg in 1917 and purchased by F. A. Mitchell-Hedges in 1953. It was housed in Fátima, Portugal from 1970 to 1993, then in the study of Pope John Paul II in the Vatican from 1993 to 2004, when it was returned to Kazan, where it is kept in the Kazan Mother of God Monastery.

Feast days of Our Lady of Kazan are 8 July (O.S.)/ 21 July (N.S.), and 22 October (O.S)/ 4 November (N.S.) (which is also the Russian Day of National Unity).

== History ==
Metropolitan Hermogenes' chronicle, written at the request of Tsar Feodor in 1595, said that after a fire destroyed Kazan in 1579, the Virgin appeared to a 10-year-old girl, Matrona, revealing the location where the icon lay hidden. The girl told the archbishop about the dream; she was not taken seriously. On 8 July 1579, after two repetitions of the dream, the girl and her mother recovered the icon on their own, buried under a destroyed house where it had been hidden to save it from the Tatars.

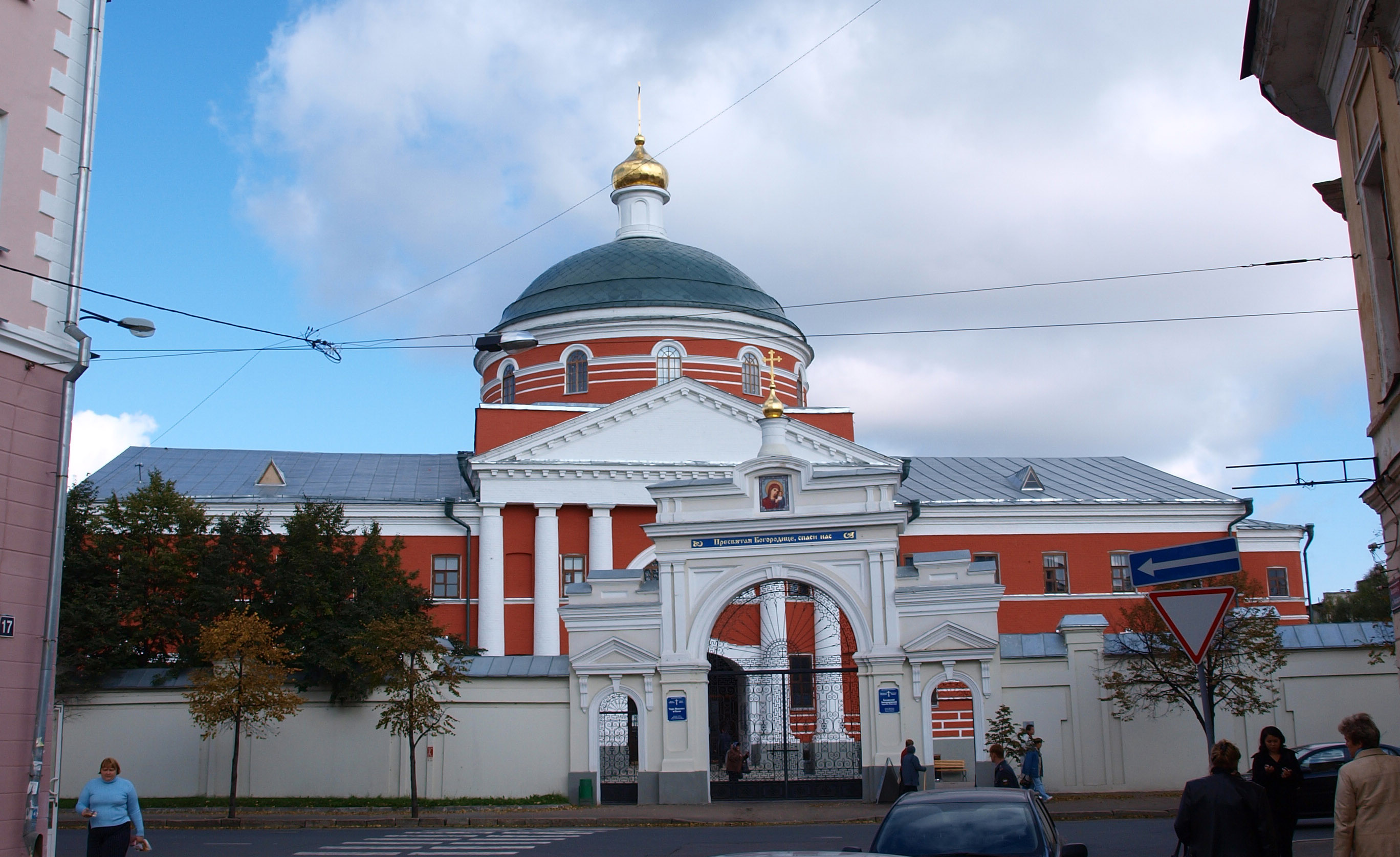
Kazan Mother of God Monastery, where the icon was kept until 1904, destroyed in 1932; rebuilt in 2016

Other churches were built in honour of the revelation of the Virgin of Kazan, and copies of the icon were displayed at the Kazan Cathedral of Moscow (constructed in the early 17th century), at Yaroslavl, and at St. Petersburg.

Russian military commanders Dmitry Pozharsky (17th century) and Mikhail Kutuzov (19th century) credited invocation of the Virgin Mary through the icon with helping the country to repel the Polish invasion of 1612.

On the night of June 29, 1904, the icon was stolen from the Kazan Convent of the Mother of God where it had been kept for centuries (the building was later demolished by the communist authorities). Thieves apparently coveted the icon's gold frame, which was ornamented with many jewels. Several years later, Russian police apprehended the thieves and recovered the frame. The thieves originally declared that the icon itself had been cut to pieces and burnt, although one of them eventually confessed that it was housed in a monastery in the wilds of Siberia. This one was believed to be a fake, and the Russian police refused to investigate, using the logic that it would be very unlucky to venerate a fake icon as though it were authentic. The Orthodox Church interpreted the disappearance of the icon as a sign of tragedies that would plague Russia after the icon had been lost and the Russian peasantry was inclined to credit all the miseries of the Revolution of 1905, as well as Russia's defeat in the Russo-Japanese War of 1904–1905, to the desecration of her icon.

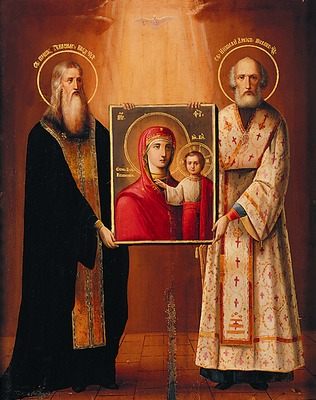
Icon of Saint Nicolas and the Venerable Gerasimus holding the icon

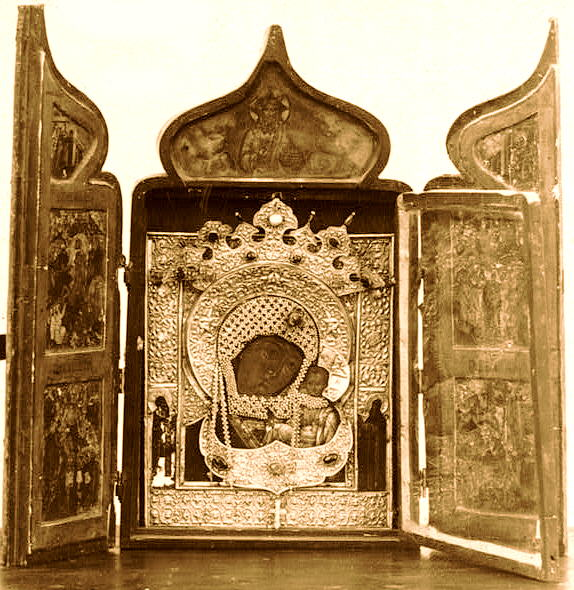
Our Lady of Kazan in Makaryev Monastery (17th century, photograph by Sergey Prokudin-Gorsky)

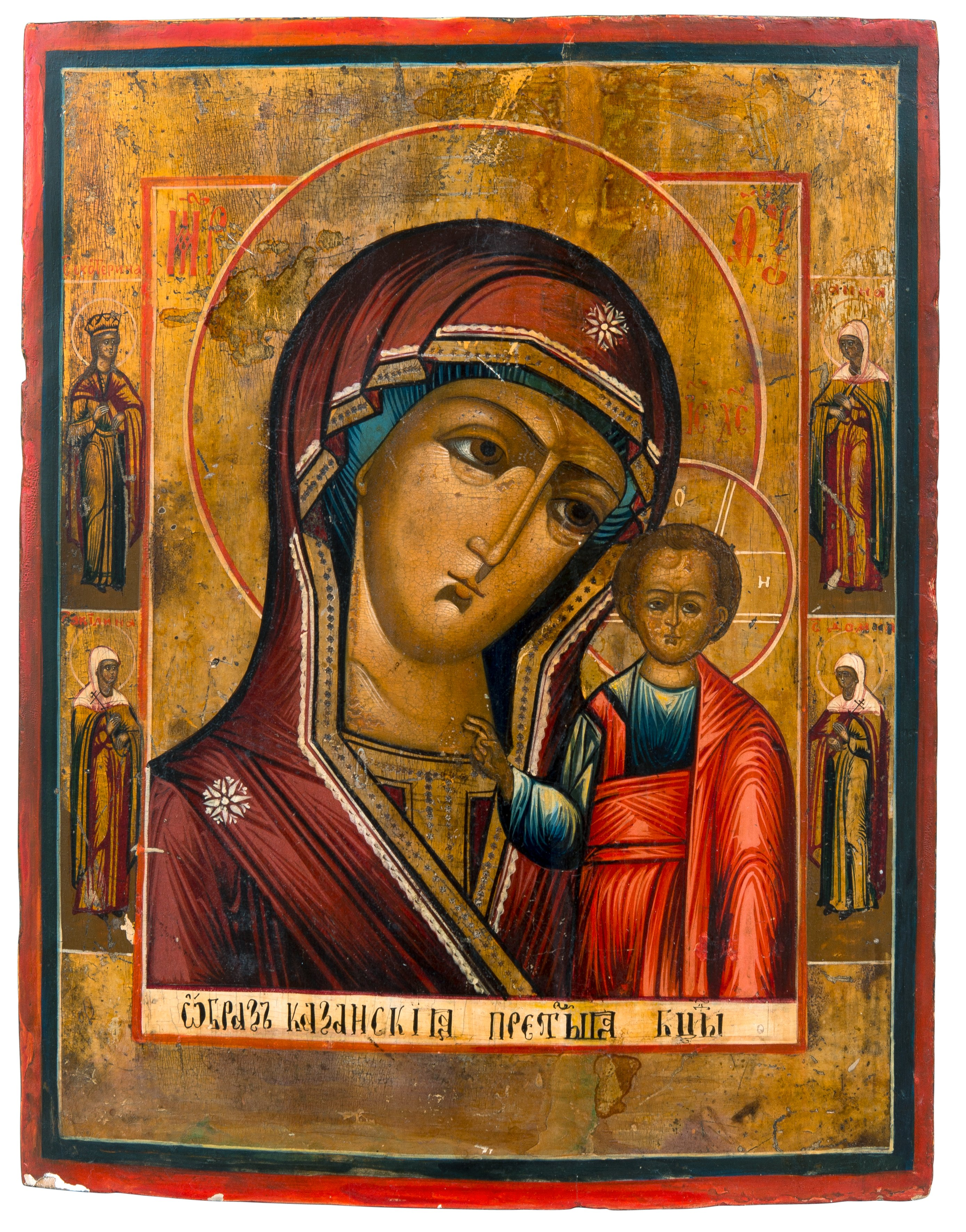
Our Lady of Kazan (1850s reproduction)

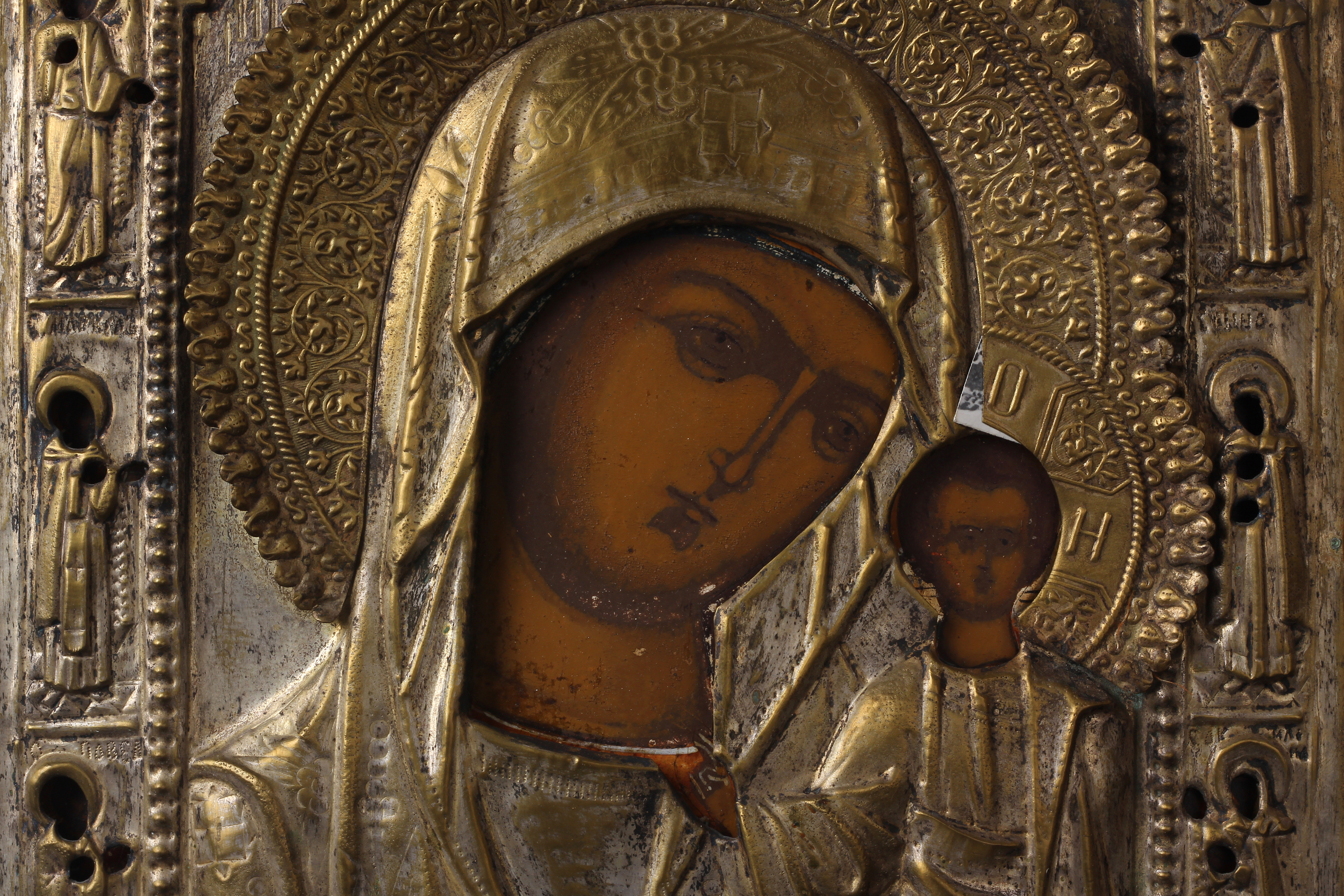
Icon Our Lady of Kazan. Mid 19th-century

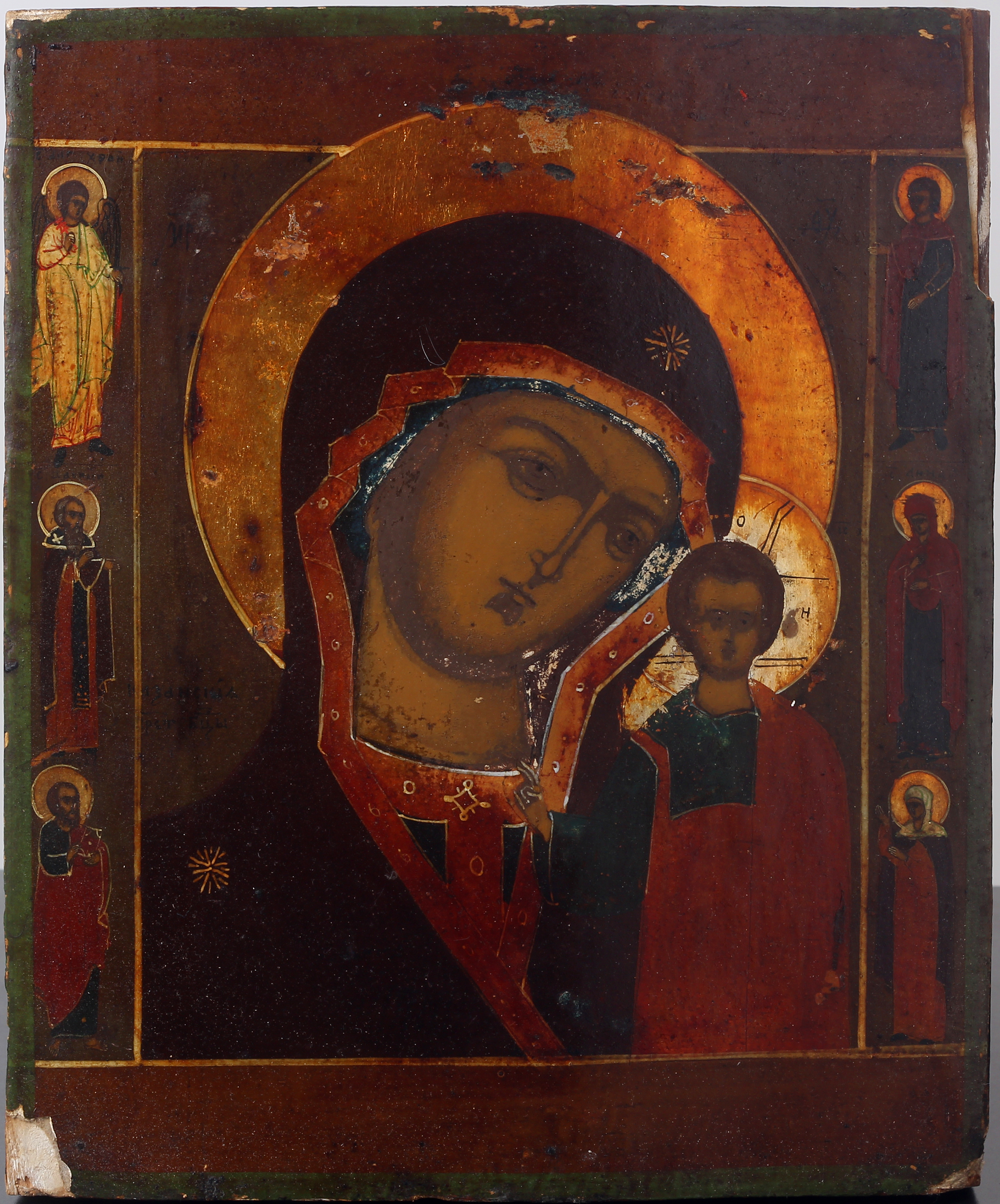
Icon. Our Lady of Kazan

=== Vatican copy ===
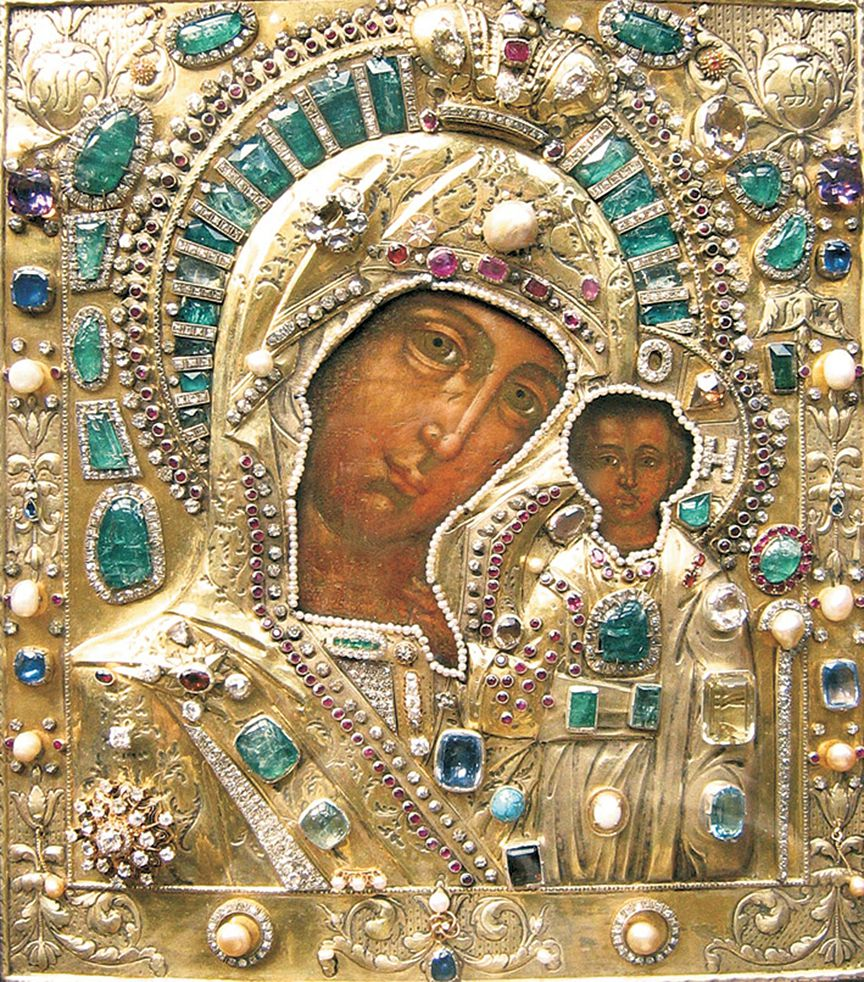
Our Lady of Kazan (Vatican copy)

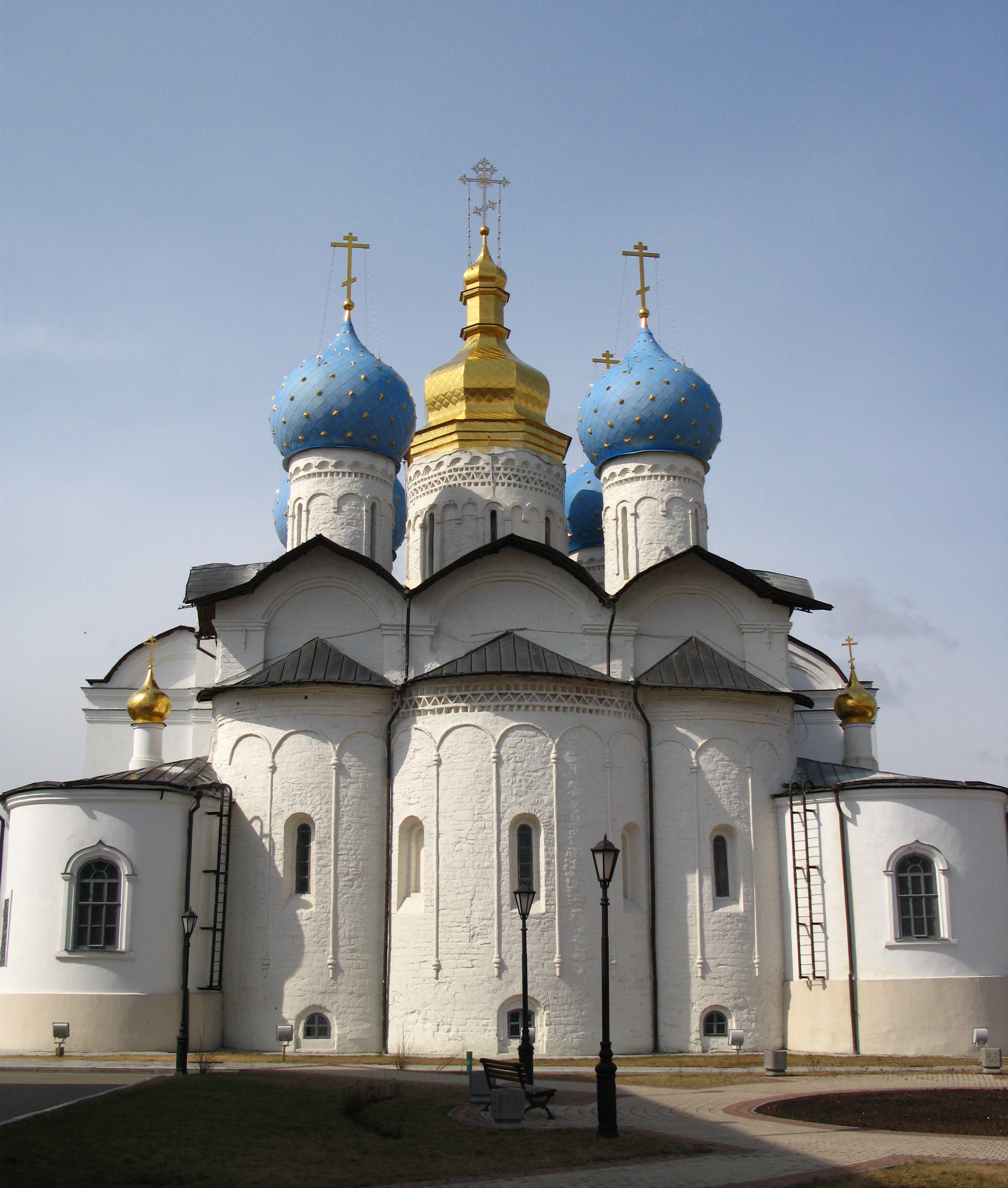
Annunciation Cathedral, Kazan (1561–62)

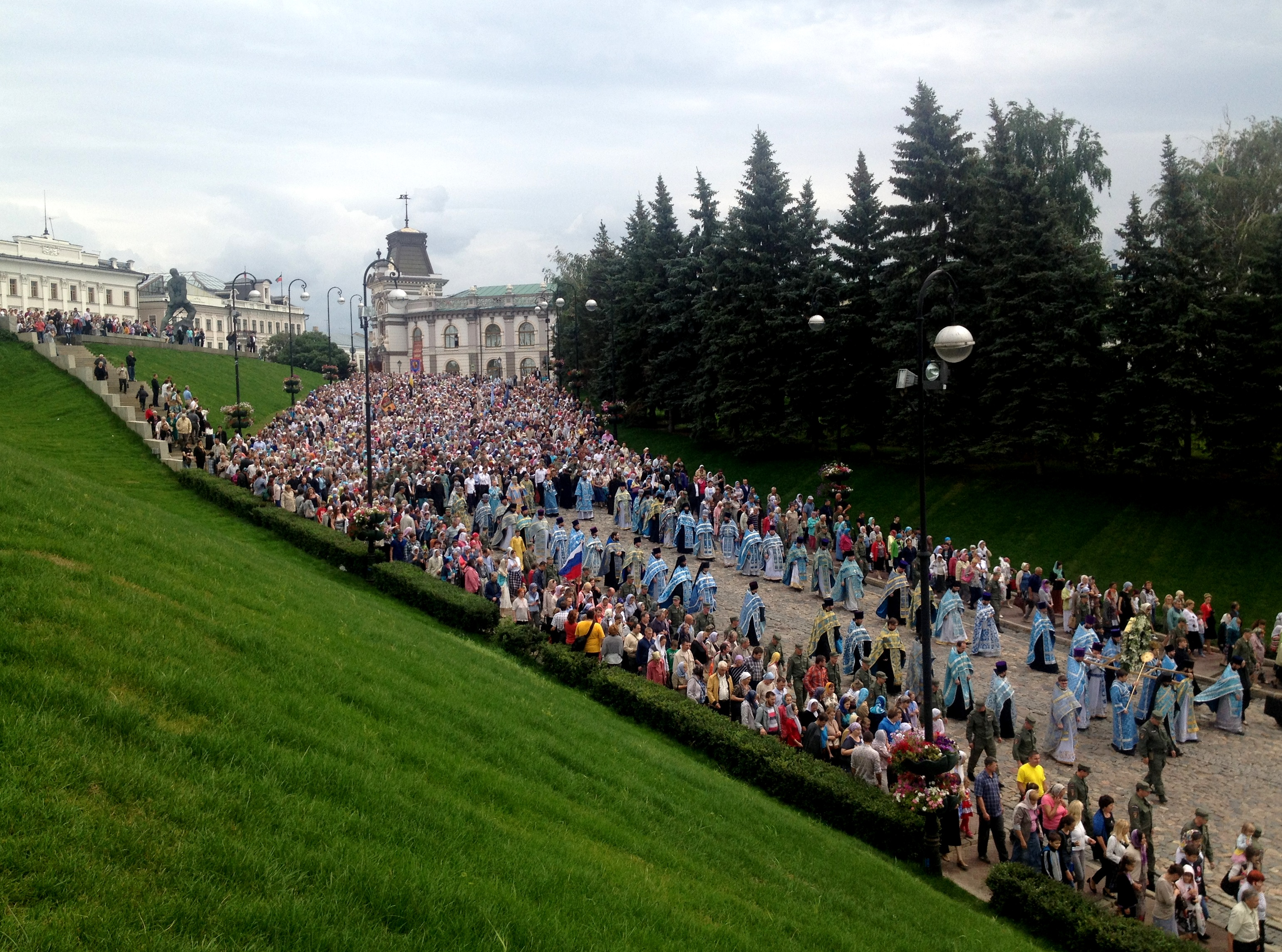
Procession to the site of the icon's recovery, 21 July 2015.

After the Russian Revolution of 1917, there was speculation that the original icon was in fact preserved in St. Petersburg. Reportedly, an icon of Our Lady of Kazan was used in processions around Leningrad fortifications during the Siege of Leningrad (1941–1944) during World War II.

Another theory proposed that the Bolsheviks had sold the icon abroad, although the Russian Orthodox Church did not accept such theories. The history of the stolen icon between 1917 and 1953 is unknown. In 1953 Frederick Mitchell-Hedges purchased an icon from Arthur Hillman. According to Yuri S. Soloviev, one of Joseph Stalin's bodyguards, and Selim Bensaad, Stalin's great grandson, Stalin owned an Icon of Our Lady of Kazan.

In 1993 the icon from Fátima was given to the Vatican and Pope John Paul II had it installed in his study, where he venerated it for eleven years. In his own words, "it has found a home with me and has accompanied my daily service to the Church with its motherly gaze". John Paul II wished to visit Moscow or Kazan so that he himself could return the icon to the Russian Orthodox Church. The Moscow Patriarchate was suspicious that the Pope might have other motives, so he presented the icon to the Russian Church unconditionally in August 2004. On 26 August 2004, it was exhibited for veneration on the altar of St. Peter's Basilica and then delivered to Moscow. On the next feast day of the icon, 21 July 2005, Patriarch Alexius II and Mintimer Shaymiev, the president of Tatarstan, received it in the Annunciation Cathedral of the Kazan Kremlin. This copy is sometimes nicknamed "Vatikanskaya".
