= Sir William Richmond Brown, 2nd Baronet =

British landowner

Sir William Brown Bt DL

High Sheriff of Northamptonshire
- In office 1873–1873
- Preceded by: Henry Osmond Nethercote
- Succeeded by: John Albert Craven

Personal details
- Born: William Richmond Brown; 16 January 1840
- Died: 10 May 1906 (aged 66)
- Spouse: Emily Mountsteven (after 1862)
- Relations: James Clifton Brown (brother); Sir Alexander Brown, 1st Baronet (brother)
- Children: 7
- Parent(s): Alexander Brown; Sarah Benedict Brown

Sir William Richmond Brown, 2nd Baronet DL (16 January 1840 – 10 May 1906) was an English landowner.

== Early life ==
William Richmond Brown was born on 16 January 1840. He was the eldest of four sons and one daughter born to Alexander Brown and Sarah Benedict (née Brown) Brown. His two surviving brothers were James Clifton Brown, a Member of Parliament for Newbury and Sir Alexander Hargreaves Brown, 1st Baronet, the Liberal Party, and later Liberal Unionist, politician who sat in the House of Commons from 1868 to 1906. His sister was Louisa Brown, the wife of Alexander William Cobham.

His parents were first cousins as his grandfathers, Sir William Brown, 1st Baronet and James Brown, both prominent merchants and bankers, were brothers. His great-grandfather was Alexander Brown, the founder of Alex. Brown & Sons, the first investment bank in the United States. Among his extended family was grand-uncle George Brown, founder of Brown Bros. & Co. and Baltimore and Ohio Railroad, and uncle John Crosby Brown, who became the senior partner in Brown Bros. & Co.

As his father predeceased his paternal grandfather, Sir William Brown, 1st Baronet, of Richmond Hill, William succeeded to the Brown baronetcy in 1864.

== Career ==
Brown attained the rank of Colonel in the 1st Lancashire Artillery Volunteers, and held the office of Deputy Lieutenant. In 1873, he succeeded Henry Osmond Nethercote as the High Sheriff of Northamptonshire.

== Personal life ==
On 28 May 1862, Sir William was married to Emily Mountsteven, daughter of General William Thomas Blewett Mountsteven and Emily (née Woodforde) Mountsteven. Together, they lived at Chesham Place in Belgravia, London, and Astrop Park, and were the parents of seven children:

- Amy Woodforde Brown (1863–1876), who died aged thirteen.
- Sir Melville Richmond Brown, 3rd Baronet (1866–1944), who died without issue.
- Frederick Richmond Brown (1868–1933), who married Anne Luxmoore Lees.
- Ethel Richmond Brown (b. 1871)
- Alice Richmond Brown (1874–1933), who married George Hunter Garnett-Orme in 1904. George volunteered excavating the Mortuary Temple of Hatshepsut at Deir el-Bahri with Édouard Naville. His sister, Frances Garnett-Orme, was murdered at the Savoy Hotel in Mussoorie in 1911.
- Margaret Richmond Brown (1876–1963), who died unmarried.
- Dora Richmond Brown (1880–1971), who married Lt.-Col. Julian Lawrence Fisher, son of Walter Fisher.

Sir William died on 10 May 1906 and was succeeded in the baronetcy by his eldest son Melville.

=== Descendants ===
As his eldest son did not marry, upon the 3rd Baronet's death in 1944, Charles Frederick Richmond Brown (1902–1995), the eldest son of Sir William's second son Frederick became the 4th Baronet.

Honorary titles
Preceded by Henry Osmond Nethercote	High Sheriff of Northamptonshire; 1873	Succeeded by John Albert Craven
Baronetage of the United Kingdom
Preceded by William Brown	Baronet (of Richmond Hill); 1864–1906	Succeeded by Melville Richmond Brown
