= Henry baronets =

Baronetcy in the Baronetage of the United Kingdom

There have been three baronetcies created for persons with the surname Henry, all in the Baronetage of the United Kingdom. As of 2014 one creation is dormant and the other two are extinct.

The Henry baronetcy, of Parkwood in the County of Berkshire, was created in the Baronetage of the United Kingdom on 7 February 1911 for Charles Henry, Liberal Member of Parliament for Wellington and The Wrekin. The title became extinct on his death in 1919.

The Henry baronetcy, of Campden House Court, was created in the Baronetage of the United Kingdom on 6 November 1918 for Edward Henry, Commissioner of Police of the Metropolis from 1903 to 1918. His only son Edward John Grey Henry (d. 1930) had predeceased him and the title became extinct on his death in 1931.

The Henry baronetcy, of Cahore in the County of Londonderry, was created in the Baronetage of the United Kingdom on 26 February 1923 for the prominent lawyer and judge Denis Henry. He was Solicitor-General for Ireland from 1918 to 1919 and Lord Chief Justice of Northern Ireland from 1921 to 1925. As of 2025 the baronetcy is classified as 'dormant' on the Baronetcy Roll.

The family seat was The Rath, near Draperstown, County Londonderry.

== Henry baronets, of Parkwood (1911) ==
- Sir Charles Solomon Henry, 1st Baronet (1860–1919)

== Henry baronets, of Campden House Court (1918) ==
- Sir Edward Richard Henry, 1st Baronet (1850–1931)

== Henry baronets, of Cahore (1923) ==
- Sir Denis Stanislaus Henry, 1st Baronet (1864–1925)
- Sir James Holmes Henry, 2nd Baronet (1911–1997)

Patrick Denis Henry, (born 1957) is presumed to qualify as the 3rd baronet. The Baronetcy Roll classifies it as 'dormant'.
