= Sir Charles Richmond Brown, 4th Baronet =

Sir Charles Brown
- Born: Charles Frederick Richmond Brown; 6 December 1902
- Died: 9 July 1995 (aged 92)
- Education: Eton College
- Spouses: Audrey Baring (m. 1933; div. 1948) Gwendolen Carlis Meysey-Thompson (m. 1951; div. 1968) Pauline Emily Gwyneth Mansel Morgan (m. 1969)
- Children: 3
- Parent(s): Frederick Richmond Brown; Anne Luxmoore Lees

Sir Charles Frederick Richmond Brown, 4th Baronet TD DL (6 December 1902 – 9 July 1995) was a British soldier.

== Early life ==
Charles Frederick Richmond Brown was born on 6 December 1902. He was the son of Frederick Richmond Brown and Anne Luxmoore Lees.

His paternal grandparents were Sir William Richmond Brown, 2nd Baronet and his wife, the former Emily Mountsteven. His maternal grandparents were George John Dumville Lees and Anne Dove (née Luxmoore) Lees.

He was educated at Eton College in Windsor. On 29 August 1933, he succeeded his childless uncle, Sir Melville Richmond Brown, 3rd Baronet, as the 4th Baronet Brown, of Richmond Hill upon the death of Capt Sir Melville Richmond Brown, 3rd Bt.

== Career ==
He served in the Welsh Guards, gaining the rank of captain. He achieve gained the rank of lieutenant-colonel in the 7th Battalion, Green Howards (Territorial Army) and fought in World War II and was awarded the Territorial Decoration.

In 1962, he held the office of Deputy Lieutenant of the North Riding of Yorkshire. He was a member of the Yorkshire Philosophical Society and elected as a Life Vice-President.

== Personal life ==
Brown's first marriage was to Audrey Baring on 29 November 1933. Audrey was a daughter of Brig.-Gen. Everard Baring and Lady Ulrica Duncombe, the second daughter of William Duncombe, 1st Earl of Feversham. Her brother, William Duncombe, Viscount Helmsley was the father of Charles Duncombe, 2nd Earl of Feversham, and her sister, Lady Hermione became the wife of Gerald FitzGerald, 5th Duke of Leinster. Before their divorce in 1948, they were the parents of:

- Jennifer Richmond Brown (b. 1934)
- George Francis Richmond Brown (b. 1938), who became the 5th Baronet and served as Extra Equerry to the Duke of Edinburgh from 1961 to 1963.
- Elizabeth Maud Richmond Brown (b. 1943), who married Guy M. A. Crawford, son of Col. Mervyn Crawford.

He married for the second time to Gwendolen Carlis Meysey-Thompson on 20 November 1951. Gwendolen was a daughter of Henry Meysey-Thompson, 1st Baron Knaresborough and Ethel Adeline Pottinger. In 1968, they also divorced in 1968.

His third marriage took place on 27 March 1969 to Pauline Emily Gwyneth Mansel Morgan, daughter of Arden William Llewelyn Morgan.

Sir Charles died on 9 July 1995 at age 92.

Baronetage of the United Kingdom
Preceded by Melville Richmond Brown	Baronet (of Richmond Hill); 1933–1995	Succeeded by George Francis; Richmond Brown
