= Sir Charles Henry, 1st Baronet =

British politician and businessman (1860–1919)

Charles Solomon Henry

Sir Charles Solomon Henry, 1st Baronet (28 January 1860 – 27 December 1919) was an Australian merchant and businessman who lived mostly in Britain and sat as a Liberal Member of Parliament (MP) in the House of Commons from 1906 until his death.

== Family and education ==
Henry was born in Adelaide, Australia the son of Isaac Henry Solomon and Rose Marks of London, . He was educated at St Marylebone and All Souls Grammar School in connection with King's College London and at the University of Göttingen. On 3 March 1892, he married Julia Lewisohn of New York City, the daughter of Leonard Lewisohn (1847–1902) a wealthy American mining magnate. They had one son, Cyril, who held a commission in the Worcestershire Regiment (Special Reserve) and who was killed at the battle of Loos in September 1915. Lady Henry endowed a nursery for the children of war workers in his memory.

== Religion ==
Henry was Jewish. He participated in Jewish welfare societies and other associations. In 1911, he laid the foundation stone of a synagogue at Southend. He also took a leading role in the financing and organisation of the Soup Kitchen for the Jewish Poor. In 1919 he was a prominent member of the organisation dedicated to the creation of a Jewish War Memorial to take the form of a fund of one million pounds for the endowment of Jewish religious education and the possible erection of a college for Jewish learning at Oxford or Cambridge.

== Career ==
In 1882, Henry established the firm of C S Henry & Co. of London, metal merchants and copper importers of which he became managing director. The undertaking was converted into a Limited Liability Company (with authorized capital of £200,000) in April 1902. The venture was clearly a great success as by 1915 he was being described as a millionaire, and Frank Owen a biographer of David Lloyd George, wrote of Henry that he was a self-made man who had made a fortune in South Africa.

During the First World War he undertook a number of missions for the government accomplishing important work in the United States of America and Sweden. At his own expense he equipped a private home for wounded soldiers in Berkshire and promoted the welfare of British troops in other ways. Henry also had interests in journalism. He was to become one of the proprietors of the Westminster Gazette and later founded the newspaper the Jewish Guardian. Many prominent Jews opposed the establishment of a Jewish state, fearing this would lead to their co-religionists losing the citizenship of those countries where they and their forebears had long lived and prospered.

== Politics ==
=== Chelmsford ===
At the general election of 1900, Henry was selected to fight the Chelmsford Division of Essex for the Liberal Party. At the time he was associated with the Liberal Imperialists, a centrist faction within the Liberal Party in the late Victorian and Edwardian periods. The Liberal Imperialists were in favour of a more positive attitude towards the development of the British Empire and Imperialism, ending the primacy of the party's commitment to Irish Home Rule. In domestic affairs they advocated the concept of 'national efficiency'. In May 1901 Henry was elected to the committee of the Imperial Liberal Council. However Chelmsford was a safe Unionist seat, the previous member having been returned unopposed in 1895 and Henry's opponent was elected with a majority of 3,129 votes.

=== Shropshire MP ===
By 1905 it had become known that Sir A H Brown, the Liberal Unionist MP for the Wellington Division of Shropshire wished to stand down at the next election. Henry was selected to stand in the constituency at the 1906 general election. His opponent, Hildebrand Harmsworth, had the benefit of the public support of Liberal Unionist leader, Joseph Chamberlain, but Henry secured the support of David Lloyd George to speak in Wellington on his behalf. Henry won the seat with a majority of 1,692 votes. Henry held his seat in a straight fight against the Unionists in January 1910 with a slightly reduced majority of 1,189 votes; and again in December 1910 this time by a majority of 1,118. The constituency was abolished for the 1918 general election and Henry switched his candidacy to the newly created seat of The Wrekin when he was returned unopposed as a supporter of the Coalition government.

=== Henry and Lloyd George ===
Both Henry's personal and political lives were intertwined with that of David Lloyd George. When Lloyd George formed his coalition government with the Conservatives in December 1916, Henry was one of those Liberals who stayed on the government side and he was generally identified as a strong supporter of the new prime minister but there was more than just political affinity between Henry and Lloyd George. Henry and his wife had been close to Lloyd George since at least the time of the death of his daughter Mair in 1907. Henry hosted a trip to Germany for Lloyd George in 1908 to allow Lloyd George, then recently appointed as Chancellor of the Exchequer, to study the invalidity insurance and contributory old age pensions which had been introduced there by Otto von Bismarck twenty-five years before. They also travelled together abroad socially to Nice and Monte Carlo and other European destinations. The American Lady Henry had pretensions to be one of London's great political hostesses and Lloyd George often attended her functions in London and at their home at Henley-on-Thames, sometimes taking his son Richard with him. Lloyd George also attended Henry family occasions at Henry's London home at Carlton Gardens. It is not known for certain if Lloyd George and Julia Henry had an affair, although one of Lloyd George's biographers states that they did, adding that it was not serious on Lloyd George's part. However they certainly flirted together and corresponded privately with each other. Richard Lloyd George apparently thought his father could be in love with the "dark, tall and very attractive Lady J". and that they were having an affair. Even King Edward VII was concerned that there had been a lot of gossip about Lady Julia and Lloyd George and this may have delayed her husband's getting his knighthood. Frances Stevenson certainly believed that Lloyd George had not only been close to Lady Henry but that Lady Henry herself was clearly in love with him, describing her as 'quite mad' about him. After Frances Stevenson started working for Lloyd George in 1911 and he began to become attracted to her, Lloyd George determined to stop any dalliance with Julia Henry. She was distressed by what she saw as a public snub and fled back to America, writing to her husband that she never wanted to be alone with Lloyd George again. It seems unlikely that Henry himself was aware of anything going on from Lloyd George's side. If anything he seems to have thought it was all in his wife's mind and believed she was exaggerating their relationship. It is also clear that Lady Henry's hurt feelings had a lot to do with the damage Lloyd George's rejection could do to her reputation as a political hostess. Some reconciliation was affected in 1915 when Lloyd George visited the Henrys to show sympathy on the loss of their son in battle even though he was reluctant to do so because of the awkwardness arising from his previous relationship with Lady Henry and the strength of Julia Henry's feelings for him. Lloyd George also visited Henry when he was ill and dying in 1919, despite Lady Henry's making a scene and her trying to use his visits to her advantage with other members of the social set. However the final breach with Lady Julia came the year after Henry's death in recriminations over Lloyd George's alleged misuse of £20,000 donated by American friends of the Henrys for British war charities.

=== Political orientation ===
Henry appears to have stayed on the right of the Liberal Party throughout his political career. He was a member of the Council of the British Empire League. On one of the main policy questions of the day, he was opposed to the idea of votes for women being a member of the National League for Opposing Women's Suffrage. When the Bill making women eligible for election to Parliament was going through the House of Commons in 1918, Henry moved an amendment to ensure they should not be able to stand for Parliament until they had reached the age of 30 years, the same age as voting eligibility. He also favoured conscription, campaigning for it before its formal introduction during the war, being a signatory to the National Service Manifesto published in August 1915.

== Honours and appointments ==
In the New Years Honours list for 1911, Henry became a baronet with the creation of the Henry Baronetcy, of Parkwood in the County of Berkshire. He also served as a Justice of the Peace for Berkshire. During the War, Henry was appointed to a number of important committees as he was identified as a loyal and sound occupant of the Coalition Liberal benches. He was a member of Lord Balfour of Burleigh's committee on After-War Trade, which was charged with looking at the possible introduction of the metric system to replace Britain's existing coinage, weights and measures. He also sat on the Committee on Commercial and Industrial Policy, chaired by Lord Balfour of Burleigh. In July 1917, Henry was appointed to sit on the House of Commons Select Committee on Finance, chaired by Herbert Samuel. In 1918, Henry was chosen by the Minister of Munitions to chair a committee of inquiry into the staffing and conditions at the headquarters of the Ministry of Munitions and to suggest economies or improvements. Henry was also sometime president of the British Section of the Inter-Allied Parliamentary Committee.

== Death ==
Henry died, aged fifty-nine, at his London home, 5 Carlton Gardens, SW1, on 27 December 1919. He had been ill for several months. His son having predeceased him, he had no heir and the Parkwood baronetcy became extinct. After cremation at Golders Green Crematorium, his ashes were buried at Willesden Jewish Cemetery on 31 December 1919. Lady Henry lived on at Carlton Gardens until her death.

On her death in 1927, Lady Henry left a bequest to set up the 'Charles and Julia Henry Fund' to support exchange scholarships between Oxford, Cambridge, Harvard and Yale universities.

Parliament of the United Kingdom
Preceded by Sir Alexander Brown, 1st Baronet	Member of Parliament for Wellington or Mid Division of Shropshire; 1906–1918	Constituency abolished
New constituency	Member of Parliament for The Wrekin; 1918–1919	Succeeded by Charles Palmer
Baronetage of the United Kingdom
New creation	Baronet (of Parkwood); 1911–1919	Extinct
Preceded by Graaf baronets	Henry baronets of Parkwood; 7 February 1911	Succeeded by Lever baronets
