= Brown baronets =

Set index for Brown baronets

There have been six baronetcies created for persons with the surname Brown), one in the Baronetage of Nova Scotia, one in the Baronetage of England, two in the Baronetage of Great Britain and two in the Baronetage of the United Kingdom. One creation is extant as of 2026.

- Brown baronets of Barbados (1664)
- Brown baronets of London (1699)
- Brown baronets of Edinburgh (1710): see Adam Brown of Blackford
- Brown baronets of Westminster (1732)
- Brown baronets of Richmond Hill (1863)
- Brown baronets of Broome Hall (1903): see Pigott-Brown baronets

== See also ==
- Browne baronets
- Broun baronets
