= Samuel Chisholm =

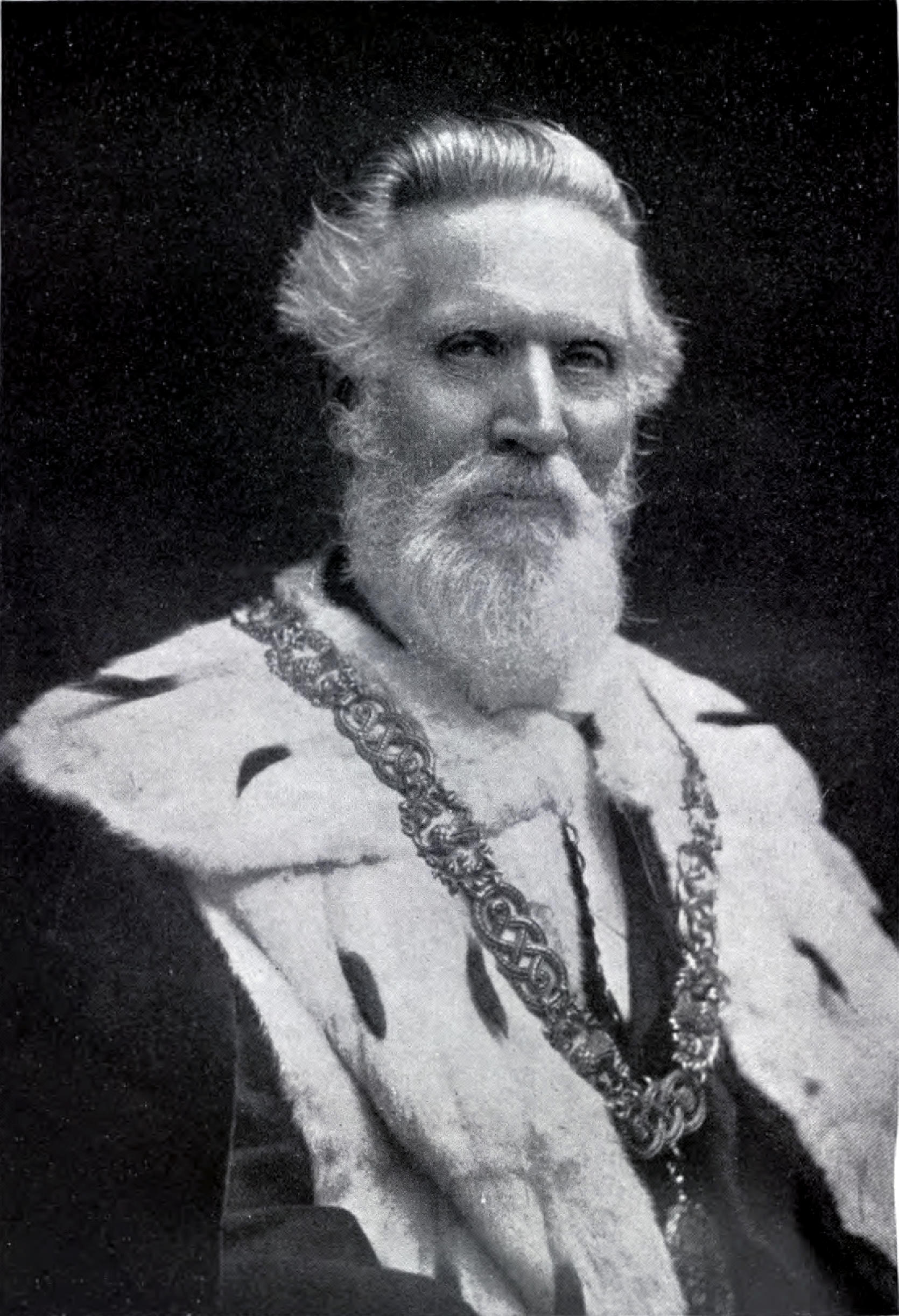
Samuel Chisholm ca. 1901

Sir Samuel Chisholm, 1st Baronet DL (23 September 1836 – 27 September 1923), was a Scottish Liberal politician and Lord Provost of Glasgow.

Chisholm stood unsuccessfully as a Liberal candidate for Glasgow Camlachie in the 1895 general election. He was elected to the Corporation of the City of Glasgow from Woodside Ward, and was Lord Provost of Glasgow between 1899 and 1902. He received criticism for spending rather freely on public receptions and events during his tenure as Lord Provost, and was defeated from the ward in the municipal elections in early November 1902.

Chisholm was noted for a baronetcy in the November 1902 Birthday Honours list, and was created a baronet, of Belhaven-terrace, in the parish of Govan, in the county of the city of Glasgow, and of St. John's Mount, Dunblane, in the parish of Dunblane, in the county of Perth, on 28 November 1902.

He received the honorary Doctor of Laws (DLL) from the University of Glasgow in June 1901, was appointed a Deputy Lieutenant of Lanarkshire in September 1901, and a Deputy Lieutenant of the County of the City of Glasgow in December 1902.

Chisholm married in Glasgow on 17 January 1903 Agnes Gieson Carnduff, widow of Thomas Henderson.

He died in September 1923, aged 87, at which time the title became extinct.

== In literature and popular culture ==
Chisholm's initiatives in municipal philanthropy were satirised by Neil Munro in the first of his Erchie MacPherson stories, published in The Glasgow Evening News of 10 February 1902. The 1902 annual inspection of the infrastructure of the Loch Katrine Water Supply Scheme led by Lord Provost Chisholm is the subject of Munro's "Erchie at the Water Trip", published in the Evening News on 7 July 1902.

Baronetage of the United Kingdom
New creation	Baronet (of Belhaven Terrace and St John's Mount); 1902–1903	Extinct
Preceded by Treves baronets	Chisholm baronets of Belhaven Terrace and St John's Mount; 4 December 1902	Succeeded by Brown baronets
