= Kazan Cathedral, Moscow =

Kazan Cathedral
- Казанский собор
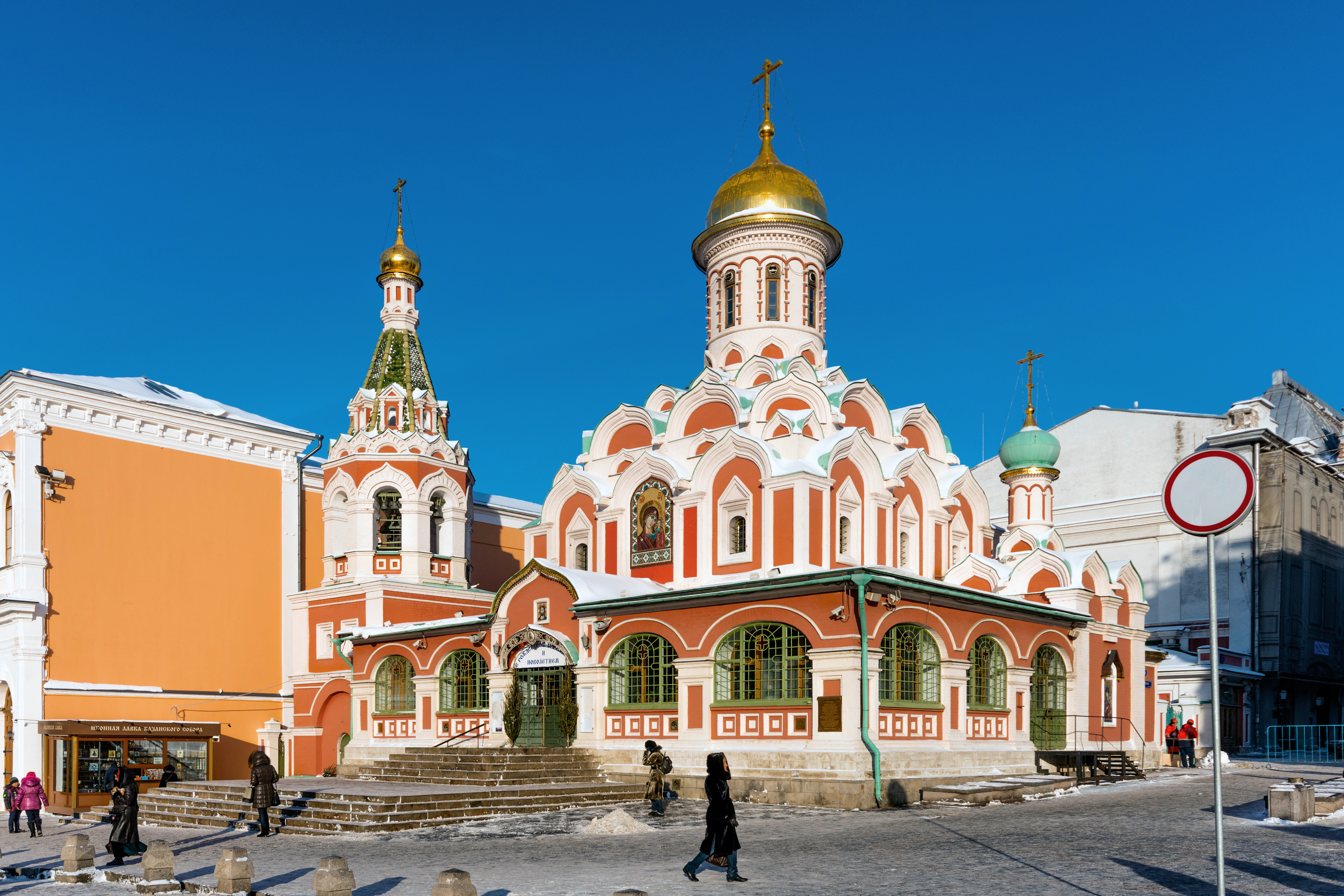
- Kazan Cathedral after its reconstruction in 1993
- Kazan Cathedral
- 55°45′19.73″N 37°37′09.16″E
- Location: Moscow
- Country: Russia
- Denomination: Russian Orthodox
- Website: Official home page

History
- Consecrated: 1625, destroyed 1936; reconsecrated 1993

Architecture
- Style: Russian

Kazan Cathedral (Russian: Казанский собор, romanized: Kazanskiy sobor), formally known as the "Cathedral of Our Lady of Kazan", is a Russian Orthodox church located on the northwest corner of Red Square in Moscow, Russia. The current building is a reconstruction of the original church, which was destroyed on the orders of Joseph Stalin in 1936.

== The original cathedral ==
Upon recovering Moscow from the armies of the Polish–Lithuanian Commonwealth in 1612 at the close of the Time of Troubles, Prince Dmitry Pozharsky attributed his success to the Kazan icon of the Mother of God, to whom he had prayed on several occasions. From his private funds, he financed construction of a wooden church to the Virgin of Kazan on Red Square in Moscow, which was first mentioned in historical records in 1625. After the diminutive shrine was destroyed by a fire in 1632, Tsar Michael I, ordered it replaced with a brick church. The one-domed edifice, featuring several tiers of kokoshniki, a wide gallery, and a tented belfry, was consecrated in October 1636.

Kazan Cathedral was considered one of the most important churches in Moscow. Annually on the anniversary of the liberation of Moscow from Poland-Lithuania, a solemn parade led by the Patriarch and the Tsar carried a processional cross from the Kremlin. By the end of the 17th century, the church building was expanded and received a bell tower and a redesigned entrance. A number of other renovations of the cathedral were undertaken during the imperial period, notably during 1801, 1805, and 1865, and much of the original design was lost behind later additions.

The history of the cathedral was tempestuous, as evidenced by the fact that its archpriest Avvakum led the party of religious dissenters, or Old Believers.

The distinguished Russian restorer Peter Baranovsky supervised a complete reconstruction of the church's exterior to its original design in 1929–1932. Some specialists, however, have found the accuracy of this reconstruction lacking.

In 1936, when Red Square was being prepared for holding the military parades of the Soviet Union, Joseph Stalin ordered the square cleared of churches. Although efforts were made by Baranovsky to save it, he could not prevent the Kazan Cathedral from being demolished (though Baranovsky did manage to save another of Red Square's cathedrals, Saint Basil's Cathedral, from destruction). In its place, initially a temporary building housing offices for the Communist International was erected. It was later used as a summer café. A temporary chapel marking the original site of the church was built in 1990 as part of the church restoration project, shortly before the collapse of the USSR.

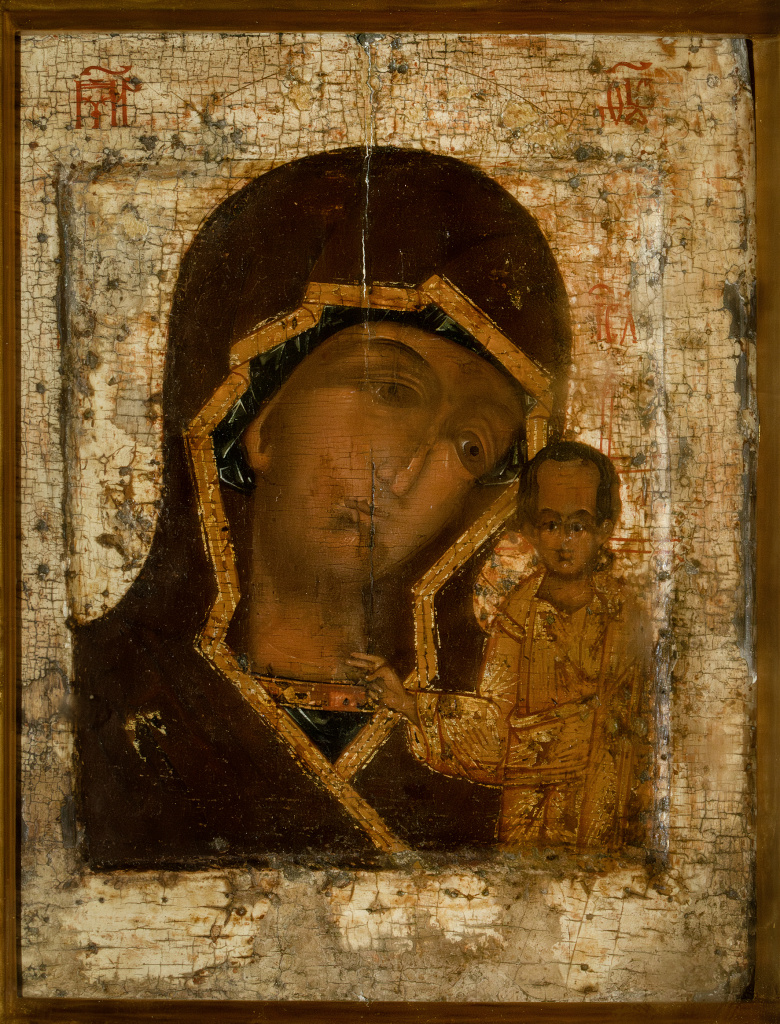
Rediscovered 16th-century copy of the Kazan icon of the Mother of God

== The rebuilding ==
After the fall of the Soviet Union, the Kazan Cathedral was the first church to be completely rebuilt after having been destroyed by the Communists. The cathedral's restoration (1990–1993) was sponsored by the Moscow city branch of the All-Russian Society for Historic Preservation and Cultural Organization, and was based on the detailed measurements and photographs of the original church. The icon of the Kazan Virgin in the restored cathedral is a rediscovered 16th-century copy, announced by Patriarch Kirill of Moscow to be the very icon before which prayed Dmitry Pozharsky.

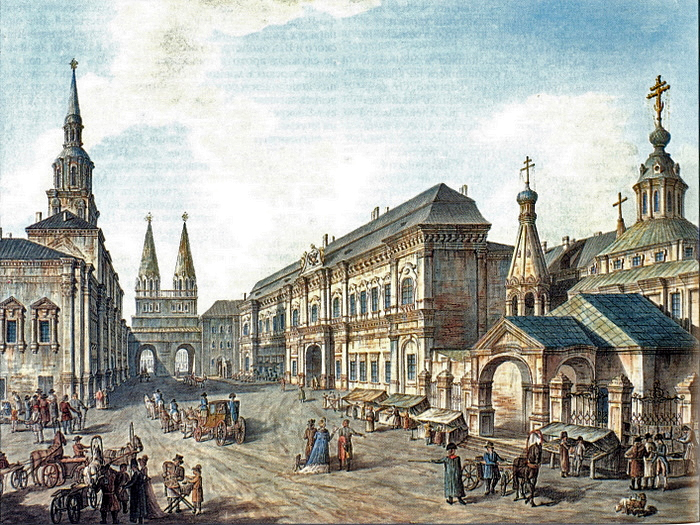
The church in 1802

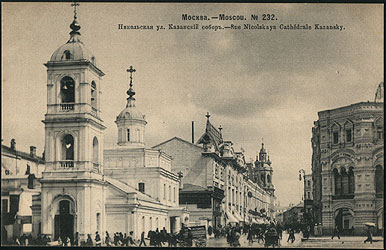
The church in 1904

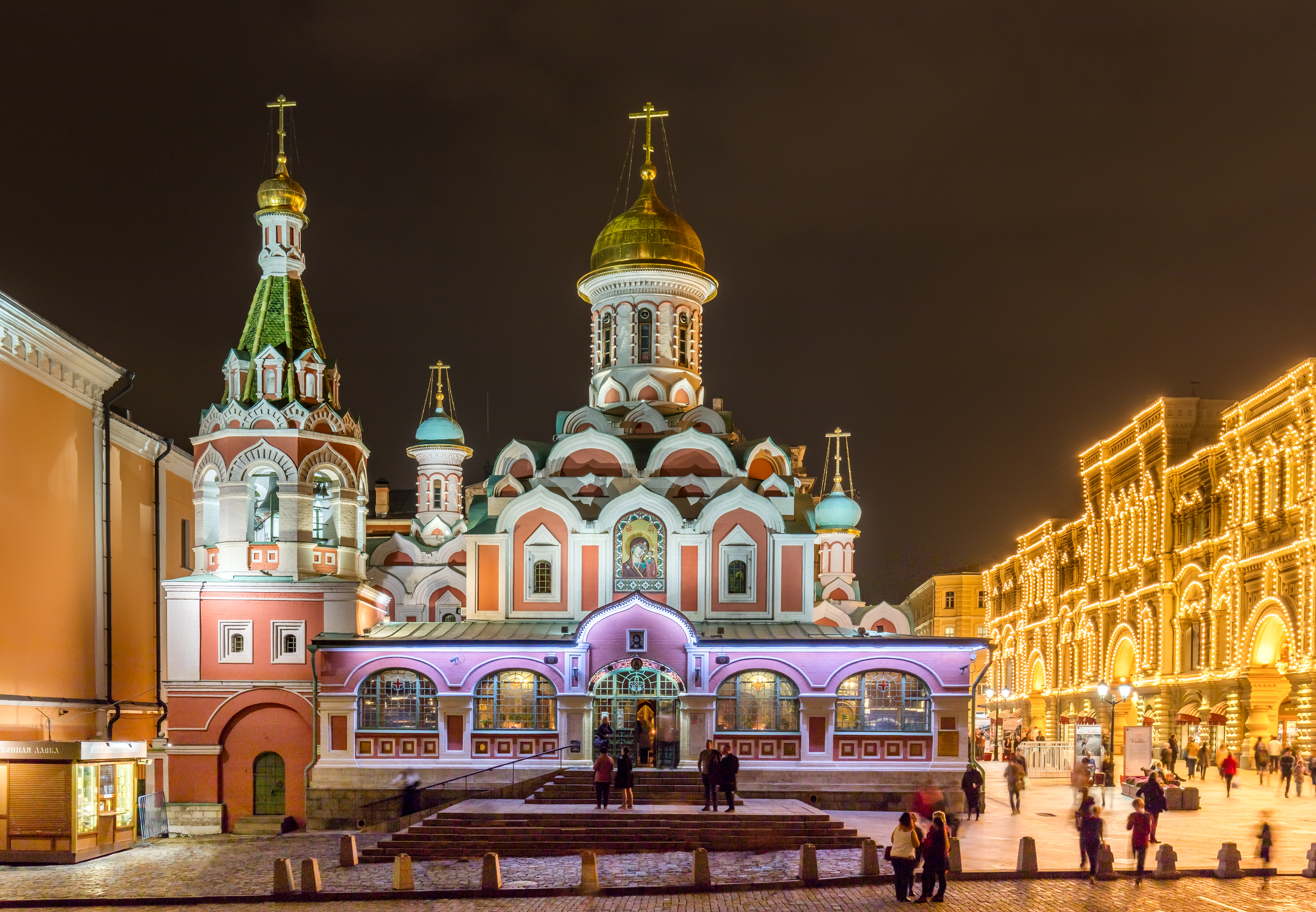
The church in 2016

== Architectural features ==
The Kazan Cathedral is typical for the first half of the XVII century type of a square in the plan of a single-domed church with a hill of corbel arches, dating back to the old cathedral of the Donskoy Monastery. Among constructions of Moscow suburb, the church of Saint Nicholas on the Arbat belonged to this type. The cathedral is surrounded on three sides by open galleries, which lead to the hipped bell tower at the northwest corner and to the northeast aisle of Abercius of Hieropolis.

According to the comment of the historian of the Old Russian architecture Pavel Rappoport, the location and the combination of large corbel arches with small ones showed the desire of Russian architects to enrich the bright, major composition with more fractional details - a harbinger of the advent of the era of "uzorochie".

== Image Gallery ==
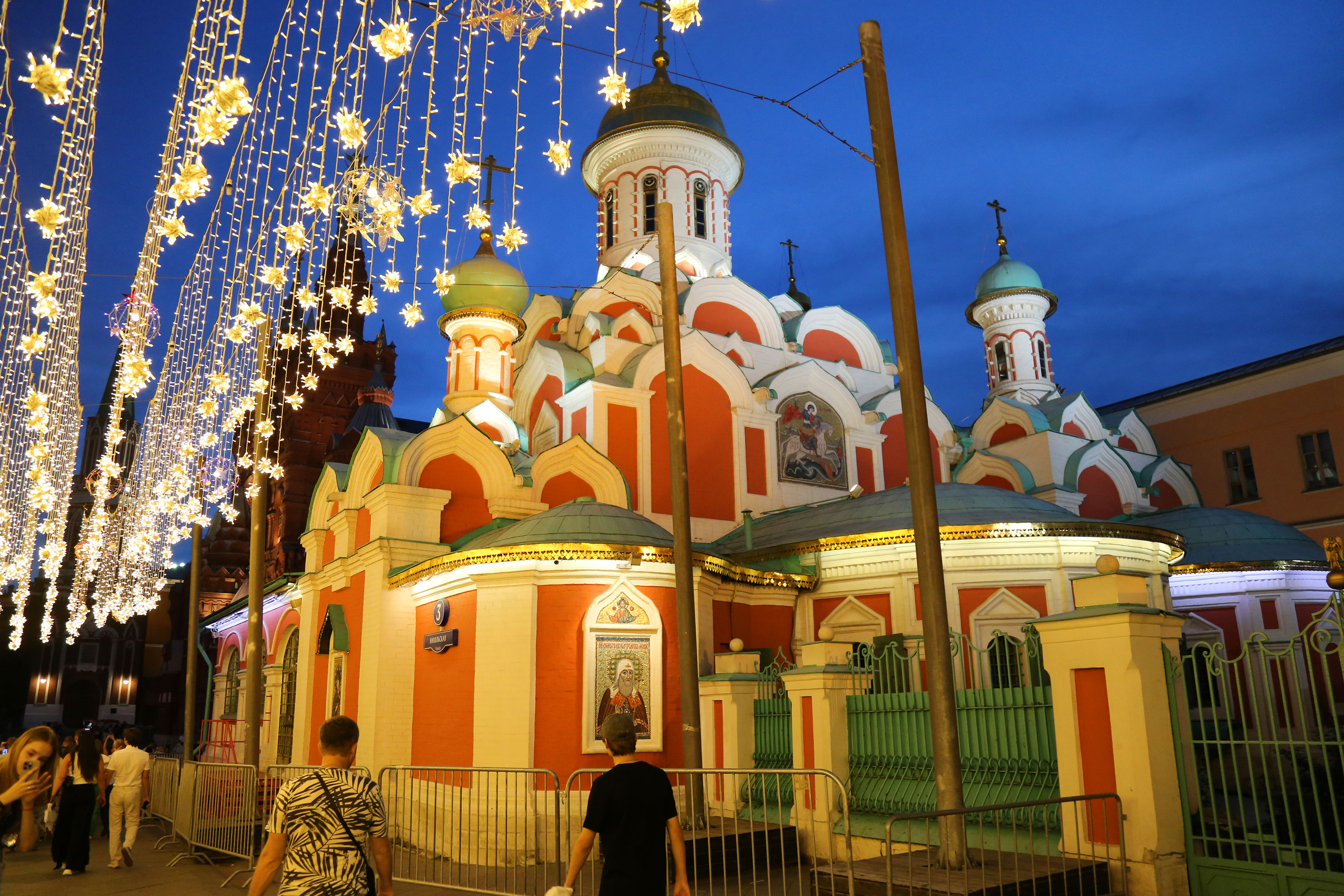
Kazan Cathedral, Moscow, Russia - August 2024

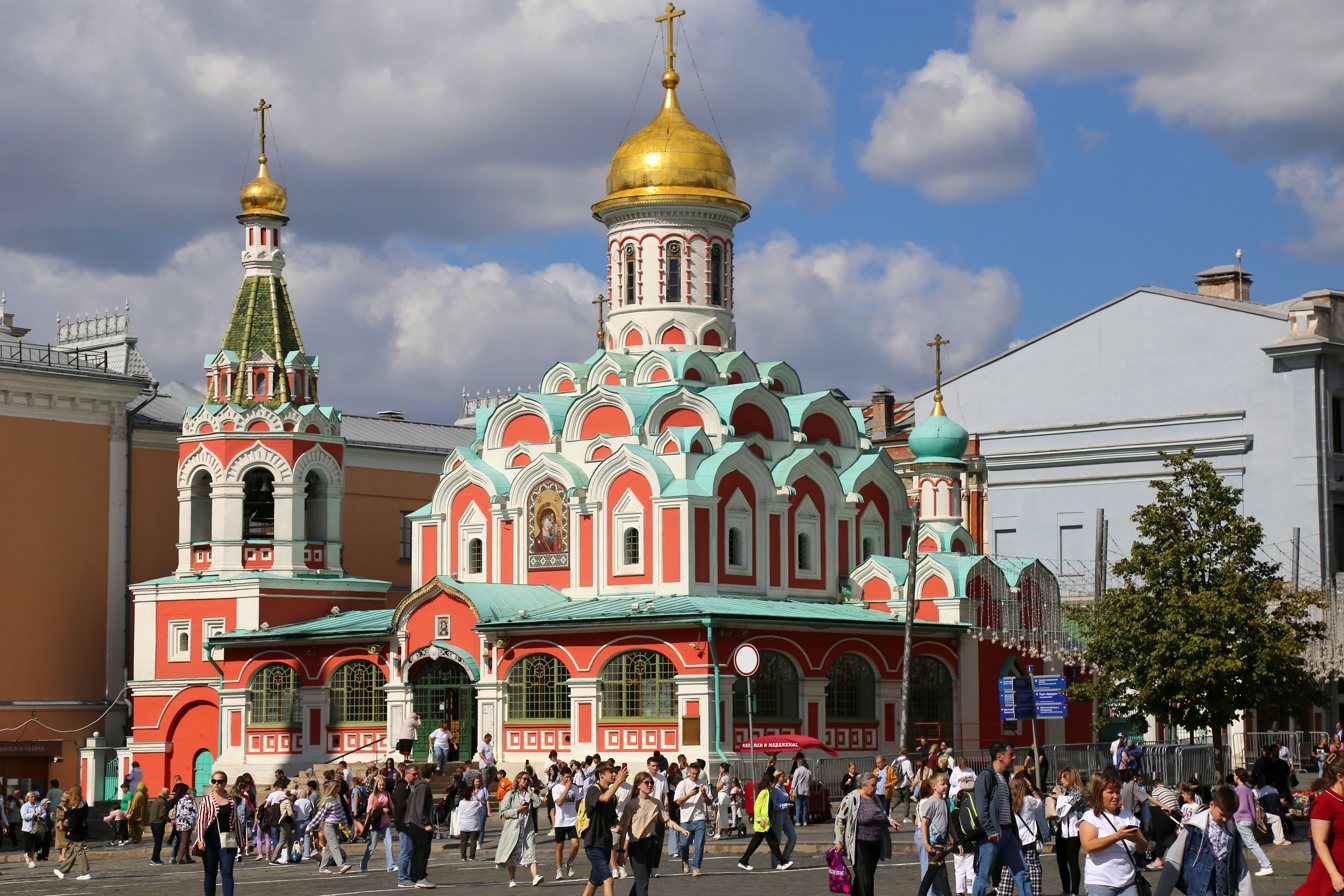
Kazan Cathedral, Moscow, Russia - August 2024

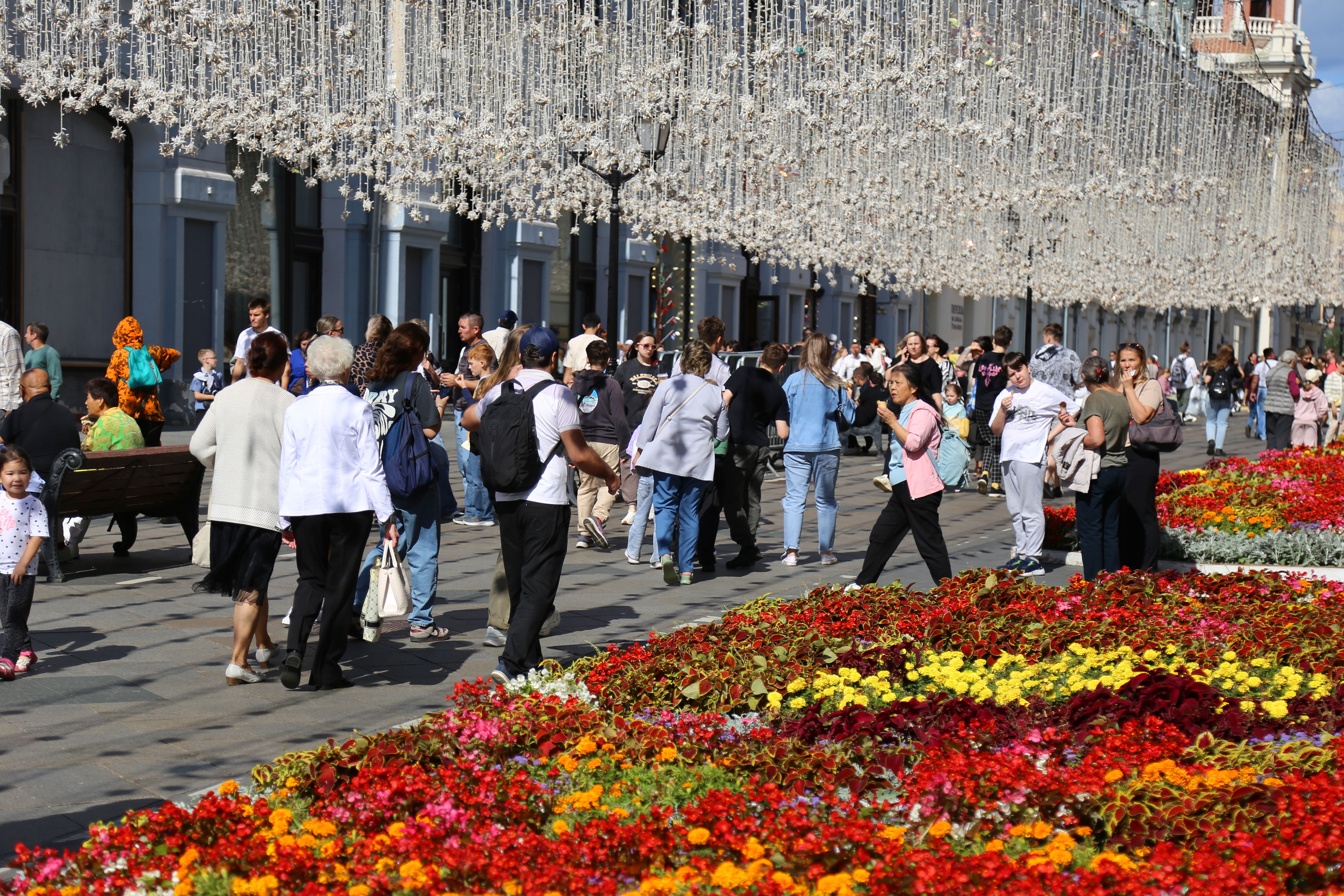
Nikolskaya St. Moscow, Russia

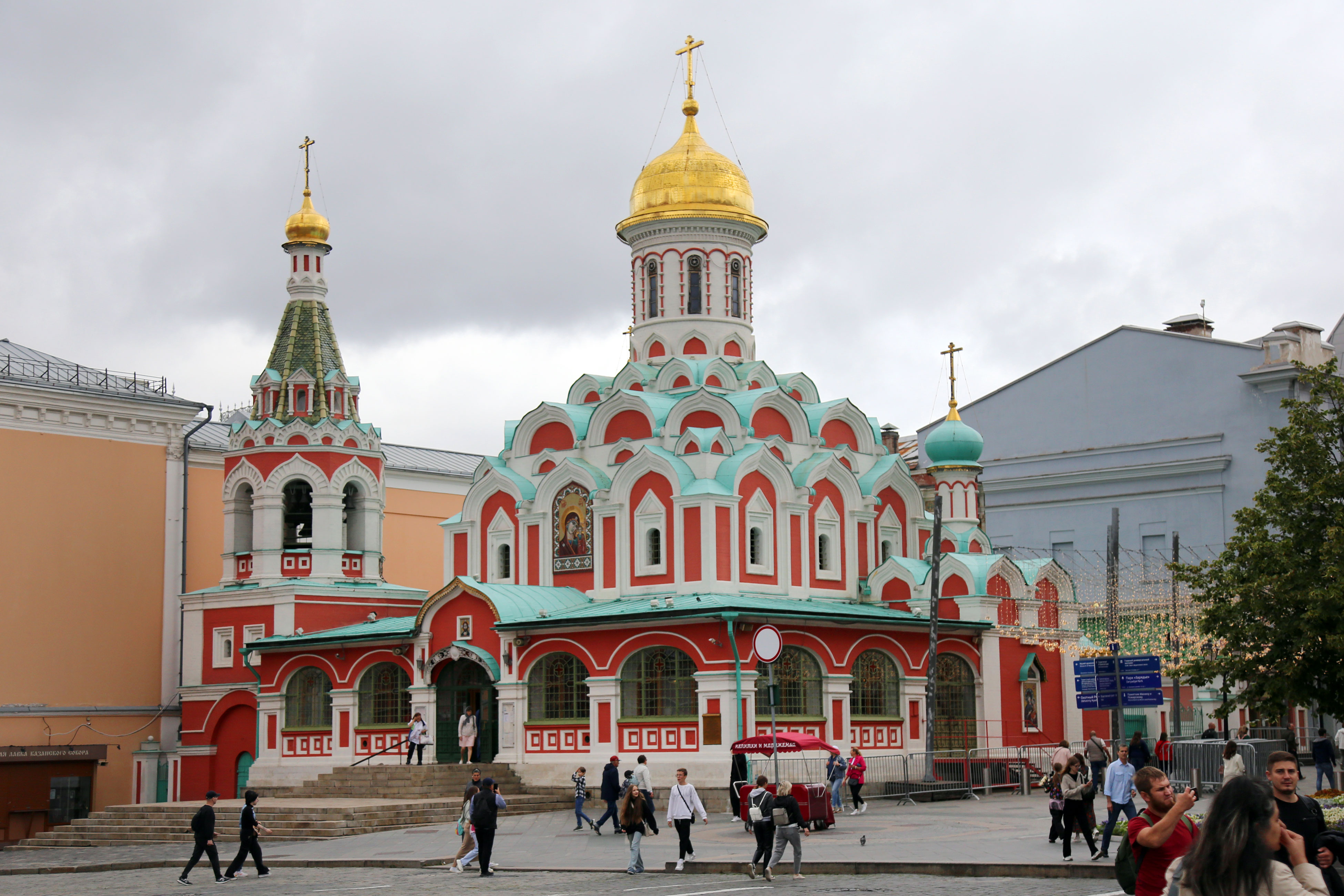
Kazan Cathedral, Moscow, Russia - August 2024
