= Henry Nethercote =

English cricketer

Henry Osmond Nethercote
Personal information
- Born: 1819
- Died: 1886

Henry Osmond Nethercote (27 December 1819 – 23 August 1886), of Moulton Grange, Northamptonshire, was an English cricketer for Oxford University and the Marylebone Cricket Club between 1838 and 1854, and was the High Sheriff of Northamptonshire for 1872. A slow bowling gentleman cricketer born in Mayfair, London, he made his debut match at Lord's on 24 June 1839 for Oxford University against the MCC, scoring one and nine as his team took a narrow two-wicket victory. Nethercote would play eighteen more first-class matches for the university, the MCC, and various invitational elevens including Slow Bowlers XI, North of England and Gentlemen of England.

His cricketing career returned 190 runs at a batting average of 6.55, largely batting with unknown handedness in the lower order. He made a best of 32. He also took eight wickets including one five-wicket haul. He became Northamptonshire's High Sheriff for 1872, and also co-authored The Pytchley Hunt – a history of the Northamptonshire Pytchley Hunt organisation – with a Charles Edmonds in 1888.
