= Brown baronets of London (1699) =

Escutcheon of the Brown baronets of London

The Brown baronetcy, of London, was created in the Baronetage of England on 14 December 1699 for William Brown, a Scottish merchant in Danzig.

The 2nd Baronet appeared as Sir John Browne "of Kew-Green" in 1727; he sold his residence to Queen Caroline of Ansbach, and it formed part of Kew Palace. The 3rd Baronet lived in the Polish–Lithuanian Commonwealth and his given name is not known. The title is presumed to have become extinct on his death circa 1760.

== Brown baronets, of London (1699) ==
- Sir William Brown, 1st Baronet (died c. 1720)
- Sir John Brown, 2nd Baronet (died 1738)
- Sir _____ Brown, 3rd Baronet (died c. 1760)
