= Brown baronets of Barbados (1664) =

The Brown baronetcy, of Barbados in the West Indies, was created in the Baronetage of Nova Scotia on 17 September 1664 for Colonel James Brown. The title became extinct on his death, which happened by March 1666 when probate was granted on his will.

Browne was a member of Francis Willoughby, 5th Baron Willoughby of Parham's Council for British Caribbean possessions in 1663.

It is implied by Lawrence-Archer that it was his daughter Willoughby Brown(e) who married in Barbados Sir William Yeamans, 2nd Baronet, and was alive in the later 1670s.

== Brown baronets, of Barbados (1664) ==
- Sir James Brown, 1st Baronet (died c. 1666)
