= Lubaantun =

Pre-Columbian Mayan city in Belize

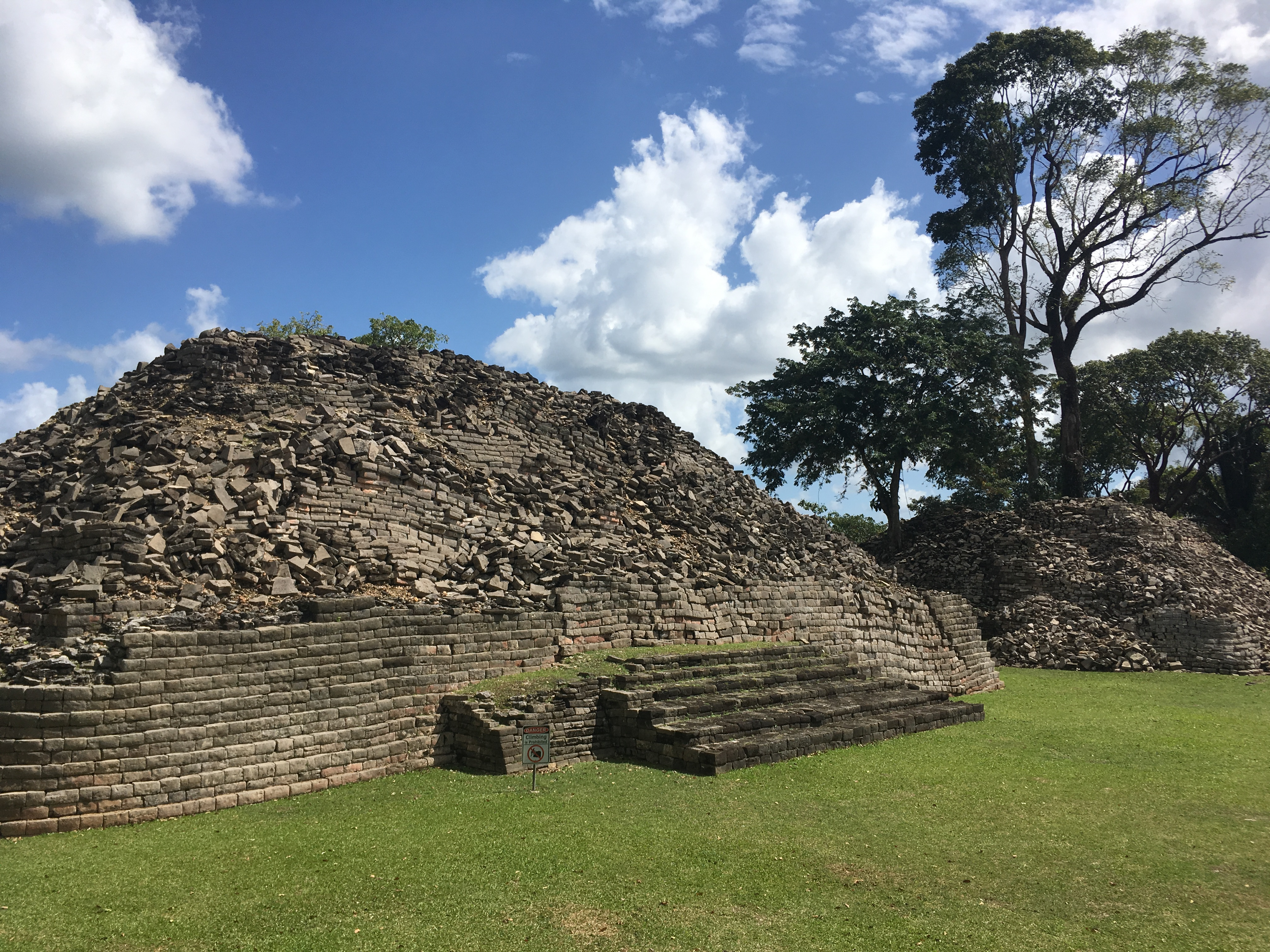
- Bases of temple platforms at Lubaantun.

- Location within Mesoamerica Location within Belize
- 16.28165°N 88.95945°W
- Periods: Classic
- Cultures: Maya
- Location: San Pedro Columbia, Toledo District, Belize
- Region: Toledo District

History
- Built: c. 700 CE
- Abandoned: c. 900 CE

Site notes
- Excavation dates: 1926–1927, 1970–1973
- Archaeologists: T.A. Joyce, Norman Hammond British Museum, Harvard University, Cambridge University

Lubaantun (pronounced /lubaːnˈtun/; also Lubaantún in Spanish orthography) is a pre-Columbian ruined city of the Maya civilization in southern Belize, Central America. Lubaantun is in Belize's Toledo District, about 42 kilometres (26 mi) northwest of Punta Gorda, and approximately 3.2 kilometres (2 mi) from the village of San Pedro Columbia, at an elevation of 61 metres (200 ft) feet above mean sea level. One of the most distinguishing features of Lubaantun is the large collection of miniature ceramic objects found on site; these detailed constructs are thought to have been charmstones or ritual-accompanying accoutrements.

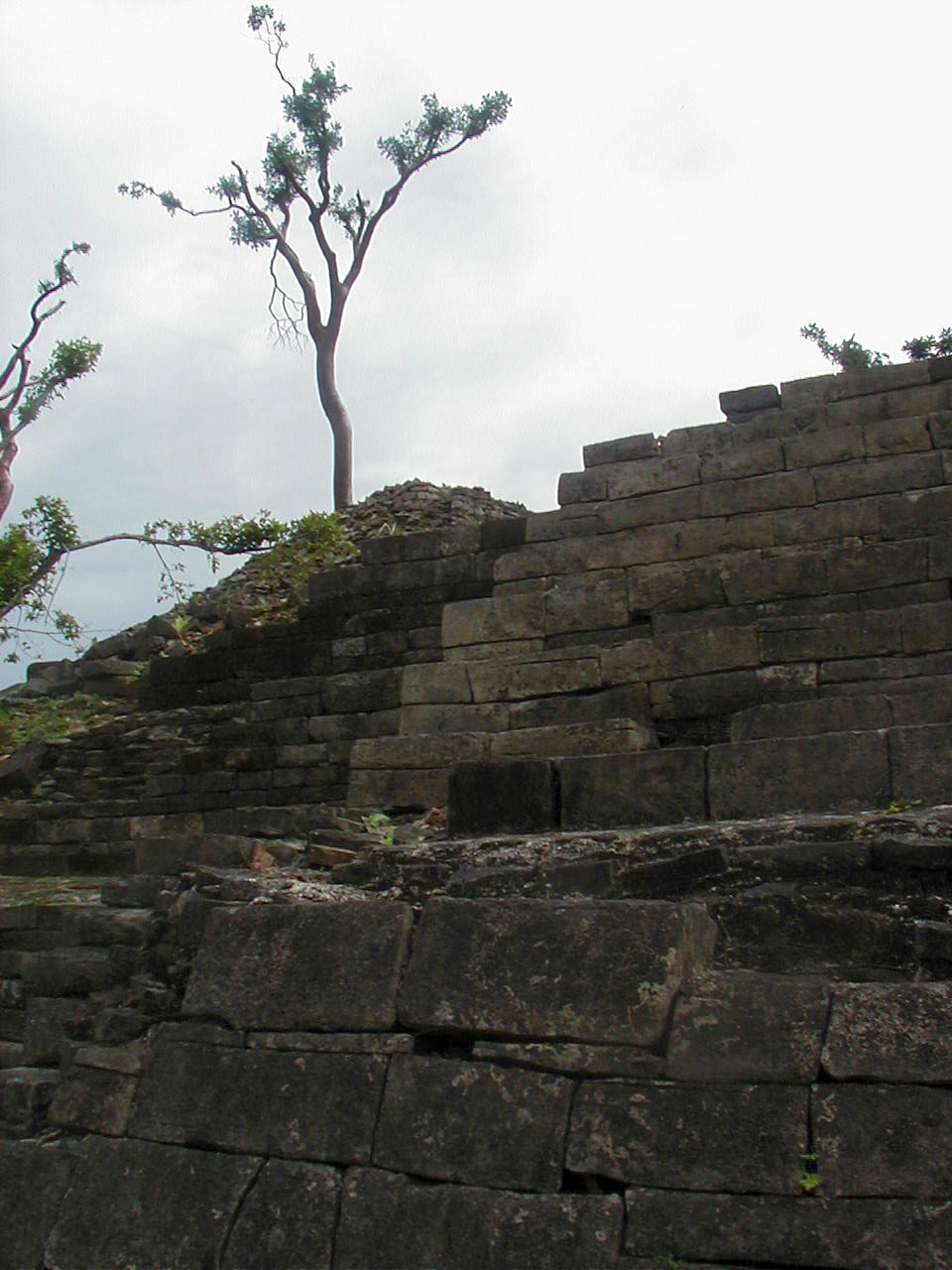
Structures are mostly built of large stone blocks laid with no mortar.

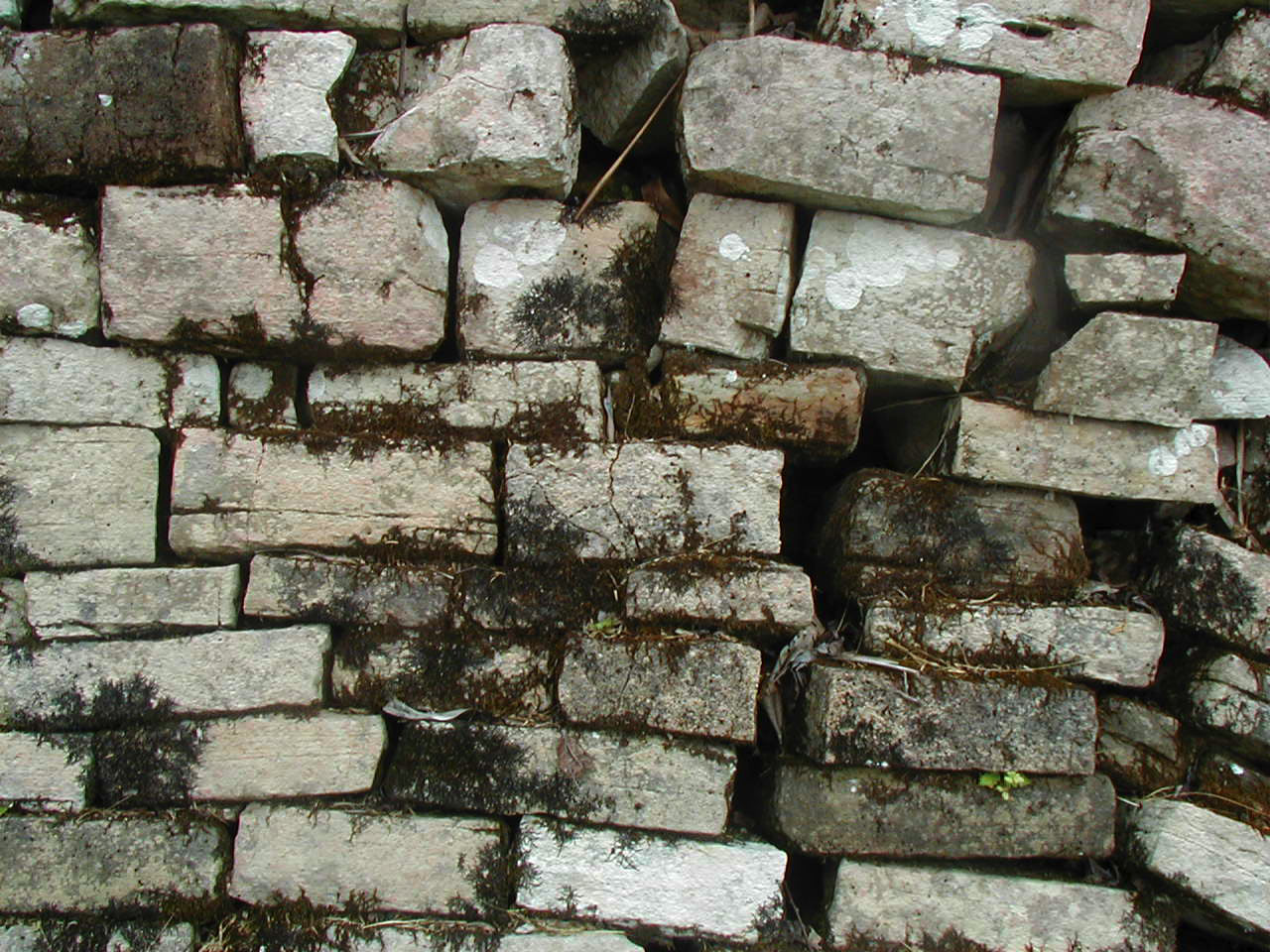
mortarless construction (detail)

The city dates from the Maya Classic era, flourishing from the AD 730s to the 890s, and seems to have been completely abandoned soon after. The architecture is somewhat unusual from typical Classical central lowlands Maya sites. Lubaantun's structures are mostly built of large stone blocks laid with no mortar, primarily black slate rather than the limestone typical of the region. Several structures have distinctive "in-and-out masonry"; each tier is built with a batter, every second course projecting slightly beyond the course below it. Corners of the step-pyramids are usually rounded, and lack stone structures atop the pyramids; presumably some had structures of perishable materials in ancient times.

The centre of the site is on a large artificially raised platform between two small rivers; it has often been noted that the situation is well-suited to military defence. The ancient name of the site is currently unknown; "Lubaantun" is a modern Maya name meaning "place of fallen stones".

== Archaeological investigations ==
At the start of the 20th century inhabitants of various Kekchi and Mopan Maya villages in the area mentioned the large ruins to inhabitants of Punta Gorda. Dr. Thomas Gann came to investigate the site in 1903, and published two reports about the ruins in 1905.

The next expedition was led by R. E. Merwin of Harvard University's Peabody Museum in 1915 who cleared the site of vegetation, made a more detailed map, took measurements and photographs, and made minor excavations. Of note Merwin discovered one of the site's three courts for playing the Mesoamerican ballgame, which had stone markers with hieroglyphic texts and depictions of the ballgame.

In 1924 Gann revisited the ruins, and then led adventurer F.A. Mitchell-Hedges to the site. In his typically sensationalistic fashion, Mitchell-Hedges published an article in the Illustrated London News claiming to have "discovered" the site. Gann made a new map of the site. The following year Mitchell-Hedges returned to Lubaantun as a reporter for the Illustrated London News, accompanied by his companion Lady Richmond Brown. Anna Mitchell-Hedges, the adoptive daughter of F. A. Mitchell-Hedges, would later claim that she not only accompanied her father on the expedition, but also that it was she who found the (in)famous crystal skull there. But there is no evidence that Anna was ever in Belize, and if the skull actually had been excavated at Lubaantun it would be hard to explain why none of the official reports mention it, why other expedition members deny that it was found there, and why the publicity-loving Mitchell-Hedges did not publish even a single mention of the skull before the 1950s. According to Nickell, there is a plethora of mystery surrounding the crystal skull allegedly found at Lubaantun. New Age believers assert that there are thirteen crystal skulls that when brought together will unite humanity and heal the world. There is little evidence to suggest that the skulls have any mystical or psychic properties other than anecdotal evidence presented by Anna Mitchell-Hedges. She claimed that the skull was the secret to her longevity, and that it has the ability to kill whoever dares mock its power. Moreover, some scholars believe that the skulls may be Aztec but assert that they certainly are not Pre-Columbian or the 3,000 years old as postulated by F.A. Mitchell-Hedges. Additionally, many archaeologists postulate that most, if not all, of the skulls are European forgeries. Importantly, it is clear from investigations by Joe Nickell and Norman Hammond that the skull was not found at Lubaantun at all, but was actually purchased by Mitchell-Hedges at a Sotheby's auction in 1943. The skull had previously belonged to the collector Sydney Burney, and photographs of it had been published in the journal Man as early as 1936.

Geoffrey Laws, along with T.A. Joyce and Mitchell-Hedges surveyed the site of Lubaantun. He noted that the site lies upon the line dividing these two geographical units, situated near the village of San Pedro Colombia, at the head of canoe navigation on the Colombia River. The ruins are located in the area formed by the convergence of two small tributaries of this river. His reports, along with other scholars, are consistent in their prostrations that the Lubaantun Maya rigorously utilized water transport. Moreover, Laws commented on the climate as being warm and humid. His report also notes an absence of any “indigenous populations” in his 1928 survey; consistent with other fieldwork at the time.

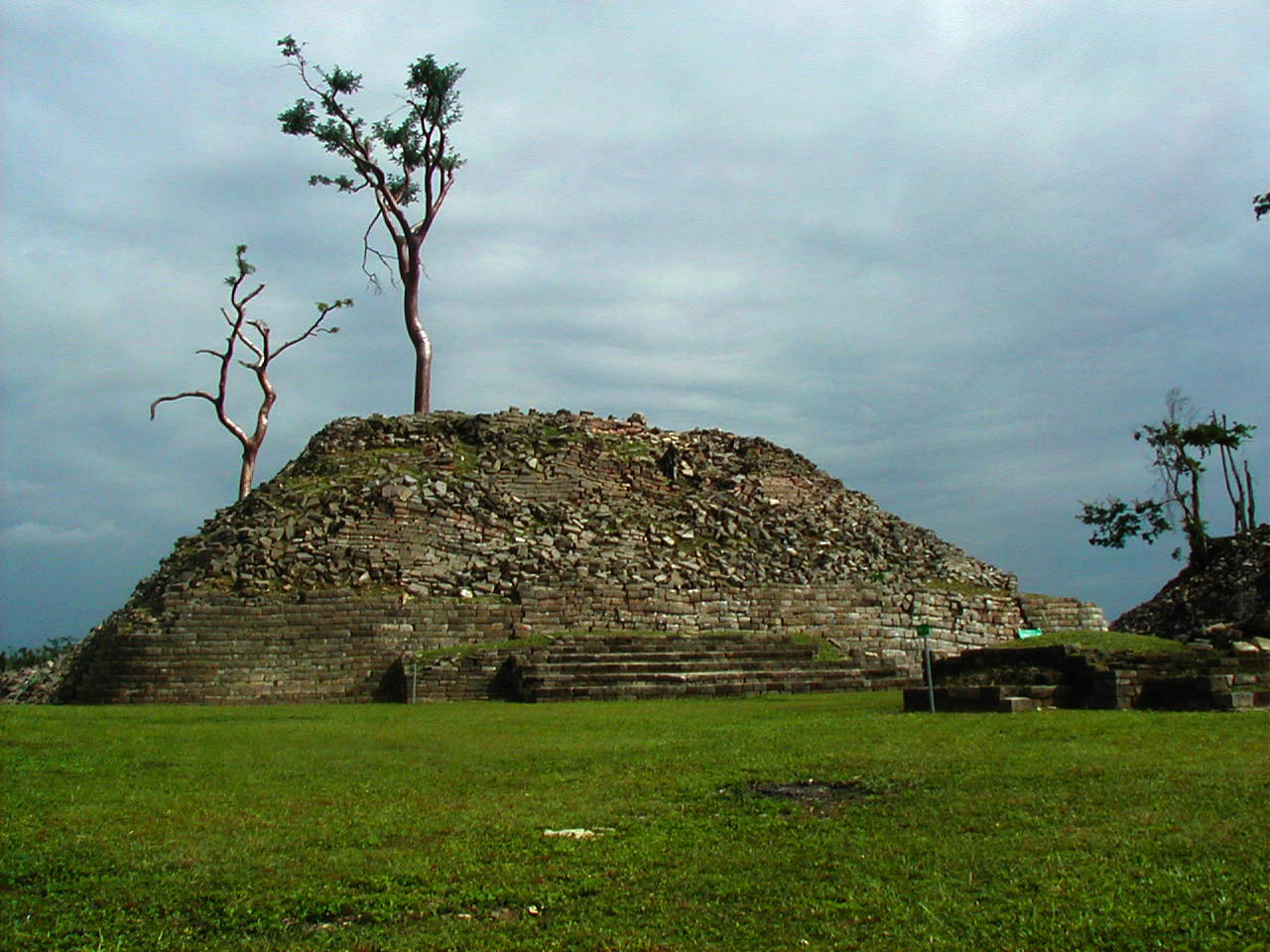
Ruins at Lubaantun

The British Museum sponsored investigations and excavations at Lubaantun under T.A. Joyce in 1926 and 1927, establishing the mid to late Classic period chronology of the site. According to Joyce, the complex at Lubaantun was 900 feet long and 600 feet wide toward the north. During his excavation the archaeologist found pottery fragments which were both shaped and painted along with stone items and shell ornaments. He believed that most of the material culture at the site indicated that it was an Early Classic site but this assertion has since been dismissed by the archaeological community. Notably, he thought that the site must have been under strict centralized control since the architectural styles found would have required large amounts of physical labor. He also identifies four “classes” of masonry: megalithic cut blocks, smaller perpendicular blocks, “in and out” structures that lacked stucco, and also poorly constructed blocks that suggest that the Maya failed to build another “in and out” building style. In addition, he details the two great pyramids that he excavated are in the “in and out” style which stand approximately 40 feet tall. Furthermore, Joyce documented the presence of large, megalithic terracing which he thought were reminiscent of Peruvian styles. He noted the absence of “ornamental” stone carvings which other scholars have recorded as well. This leads to greater difficulties in defining precise dates at Lubaantun.

Despite the lack of hieroglyphs and stelae Joyce discovered an abundance of pottery-whistle figurines which feature two finger holes, allowing for three notes to be produced. He mentioned how he found some painted pottery but it appears to be similarly fashioned to painted pieces found in Pusilha, indicating that the latter was responsible for painted works and Lubaantun produced molded figurines. The whistles often depict important cosmological figures, and officials in ceremonial garb. He identified two physical types of figurines, those he calls “chubby” and the other as “classical.” The classical features include people, depicting cranial modification, ear flares, and nose ornaments. The chubby figures include a large forehead and cheeks, and there is an absence of facial ornaments. Many of the molded figures feature masks. Joyce also made distinctions between the male and female figurines that he observed. Men often were shown wearing girdles, capes, and long skirts while women became associated with the sombrero. Joyce notes that girdles may be indicative of a warrior class distinction. Men carry “provision” bags, spears, and rattles highlighting their association with field work/hunting while women are depicted carrying water jars or baskets of agricultural products. The production of metate is additionally featured on many of these figurines. He also discovered fans at Lubaantun and a “special” series of figurines that depict crests, close-fitting helmets, a glove worn in the right hand, and highly dramatized thigh flaps. He believed that these could indicate that the figurines displayed the dress of ball players.

Many of the artefacts from this expedition can be found in the British Museum's collection. After this Lubaantun was neglected by archeologists (although it suffered some looting by treasure hunters) until 1970, when a joint British Museum, Harvard, and Cambridge University project was begun led by archaeologist Norman Hammond. Norman Hammond, Kate Pretty, and Frank P. Saul excavated the site in the 1970s. Their research team, in congruence with Sharer and Traxler, believed that the site was founded in the Late Classic period as opposed to the Early Classic, suggested by Joyce. In addition, they postulated that the site saw no Postclassic reoccupation and considered it to be abandoned until the site’s later discovery. They also discuss how Lubaantun has been subject to various looting activities. Their excavations primarily dealt with one Maya family tomb. Various problems were associated with their excavation, including water damage and collapsed masonry walls. Unlike prior surveys, their team found pottery vessels which may have been painted at one point but time has since faded their decorative coating. Hammond's team also found skeletal remains that were also badly damaged by water, but tooth preservation remained relatively good. The disposition of the skulls and bones are consistent with the Maya’s tendency to repurpose tombs, and bury multiple remains in one area. Saul reported that the tomb contained 15 adults, both male and female of various young and middle adult ages. All of the individuals had cavities except for one individual and virtually all of the remains indicate malnutrition occurred in early childhood.

The pottery vessels are primarily appear in Tepeu 2 style with some indication of Tepeu 3 in the Uaxactun chronology. The ceramic data suggest that the tomb was not utilized for a very long; no more than a century. They also found ground, and polished stone obsidian blade flakes, ear/nose plugs and a stylized flower. They claim that the site is unique because it is 1 of 26 sites (out of 115) which indicate that there were multiple burials.

Sharer and Traxler also believe that the site is a Late Classic center. They note that Normand Hammond provided a new map for the site in 1970. Their work suggests that Lubaantun was occupied “briefly” from AD 700 to 870. There is also evidence that the site was a main production center for cacao and that Lubaantuun was the local capital in that particular area. Ceramic and stone effigies with cacao pods have been found at the site. Additionally discovered is an acropolis, one ball court, and Quirigua-style architecture in the form of large masonry terraces. However, the site lacks two major components which would indicate that Lubaantuun was a Late Classic site; there are no vaulted buildings or carved sculptured monuments. Also discussed is the space and place of buildings at the site. Lubaantun, being a smaller Maya site, has discernible open public and closed private spaces.

Little is still known regarding how the Lubaantun Maya traded with other polities and their relationship with neighboring communities. While Sharer and Traxler’s work largely pertains to the cacao trade, Heather McKillop’s work at Stingray Lagoon reveals the importance of salt production and trade in the Precolumbian Maya realm. The presence of molded Lubaantun-style whistle figurines, inland goods at the Stingray Lagoon site, and unit-stamped pottery provide supporting evidence for salt production and for inland transport.

Current archaeology imbues that Lubaantun is still a widely interpreted site. Excavations demonstrate that the site is renowned for its mass of mould-made ceramic whistle figurines, manos, and metates, as well as its stair-like architecture. New research reveals that the site has three ball courts, to the east, west, and south of the major E group buildings. Scholars also estimate that the population at Lubaantun may have consisted of 600 people per square kilometer. Additionally, it is postulated that Lubaantun and Nim Li Punit was politically created from the earlier centers of Pusilha or Uxbenka. Archaeological evidence suggests that Lubaantun was built at a strategic spatial location in order to maintain access the natural ecological resources and take advantage of the pre-existing trade networks. Other research suggests that language spoken at Lubaantun was most likely a dialect of Cholan, one of the many dialects spoken in the Classic Maya heartland. Furthermore, current projects are still underway at Lubaantun. In 1998, the Maya Archaeological Sites Development Program, in tandem with the European Union, and the Belize Government’s Department of Archaeology, made successful attempts at restoration, and building of an interpretive Visitor Center at the site.

Lubaantun is now accessible to visitors by automobile and has a small visitors' centre. As of 2001 an admission fee of 10 BZD dollars was charged to visitors.

== See also ==
- List of Mesoamerican pyramids

== Bibliography ==
- Laws, Geoffrey (1928). "Survey of Lubaantun District in British Honduras". Geographical Journal (71): 224–234.
- Digby, Adrian (July 1936). "Comments on the Morphological Comparison of Two Crystal Skulls". Man. 36. London: Royal Anthropological Institute of Great Britain and Ireland: 107–109. doi:10.2307/2789342. ISSN 0025-1496. JSTOR 2789342. OCLC 42646610.
- Hammond, Norman (28 April 2008). "Secrets of the crystal skulls are lost in the mists of forgery". The Times. London: News International. Archived from the original on May 17, 2008.
- Hogan, C. Michael (2007). "Lubaantun". The Megalithic Portal.
- Morant, G.M. (July 1936). "A Morphological Comparison of Two Crystal Skulls". Man. 36. London: Royal Anthropological Institute of Great Britain and Ireland: 105–107. doi:10.2307/2789341. ISSN 0025-1496. JSTOR 2789341. OCLC 42646610.
- Nickell, Joe (2007). Adventures in Paranormal Investigation. Lexington: University Press of Kentucky. ISBN 978-0-8131-2467-4. OCLC 137305722.
- Hammond, Norman; Pretty, Kate; Saul, Frank (1975). "A Classic Maya Family Tomb". World Archaeology. 7 (1): 57–78. doi:10.1080/00438243.1975.9979621.
- "Archaeology of Lubaantun". National Institute of Culture and History.
- McKillop, Heather (1996). "Ancient Maya Trading Ports and the Integration of Long-Distance and Regional Economies: Wild Cane Cay in South-Coastal Belize". Ancient Mesoamerica. 7: 49–62. doi:10.1017/s0956536100001280.
- Nickell, Joe (2006). "Riddle of the Crystal Skulls". Skeptical Inquirer. 30 (4): 15–17.
- Traxler, L.P.; Sharer, R.J. (2006). The Ancient Maya (6th ed.). Stanford University Press. pp. 494–495, 684–685.
- Joyce, T.A. (1933). "Presidential Address. The Pottery Whistle-Figurines of Lubaantun". The Journal of the Royal Anthropological Institute of Great Britain and Ireland. 63: 15–25.
- Joyce, T.A. (1926). "Excavations at Lubaantun". The British Museum Quarterly. 1 (3): 61–65. doi:10.2307/4420762.
