= Chesham Place =

Garden square in Belgravia, London

Coordinates: 51°29′49.98″N 0°9′20.28″W

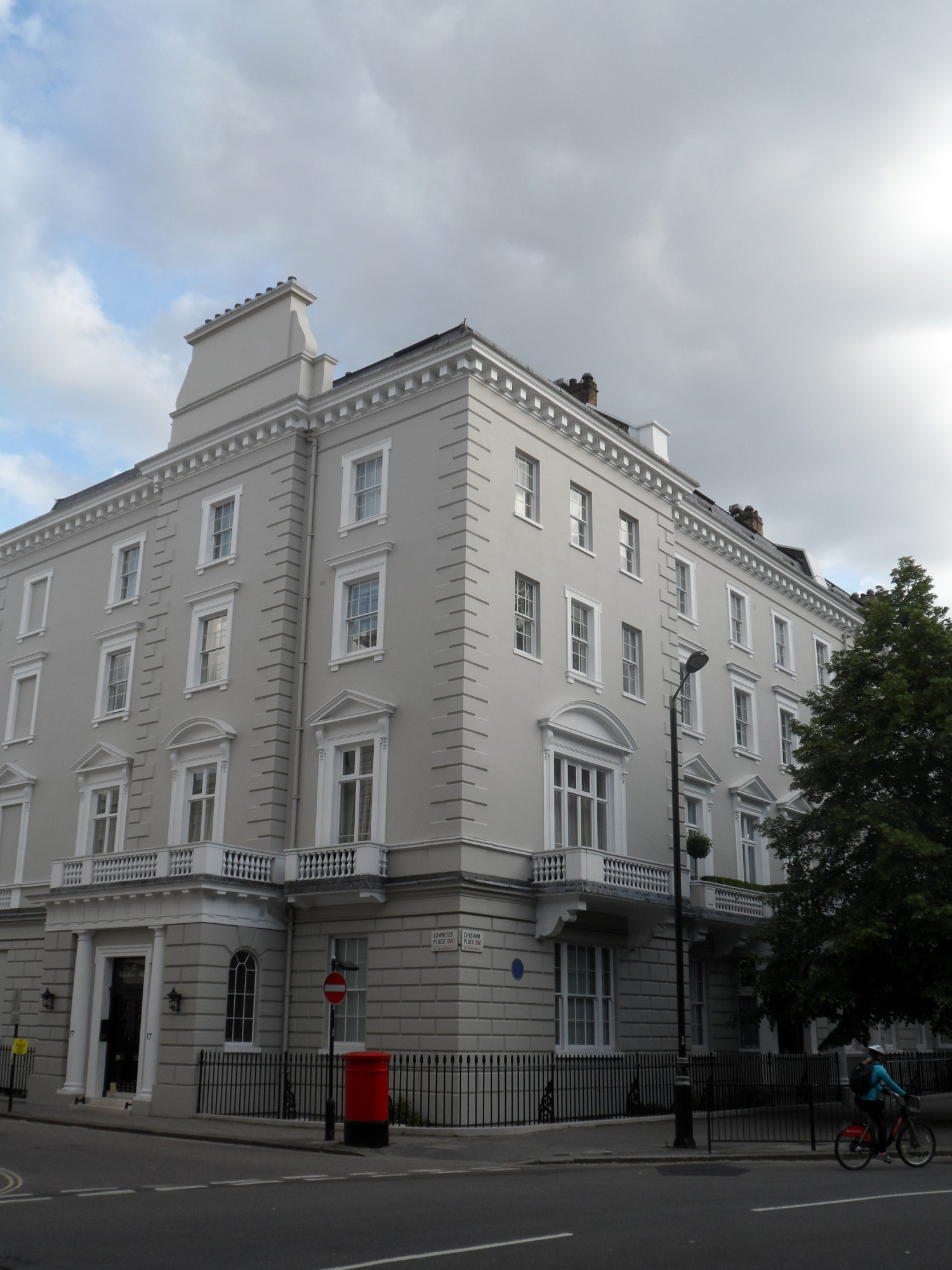
37 Chesham Place

Chesham Place is a street in Belgravia, Westminster, Greater London, running between Belgrave Square and Pont Street. It is home to several embassies and has had many distinguished residents.

It was first laid out in 1831, and includes a number of listed buildings.

Chesham Place and nearby Chesham Street take their name from the town of Chesham in Buckinghamshire, and were named by William Lowndes who owned the leases on this and nearby land.

It gives its name to Chesham Amalgamations, founded at number 36 in 1962.

== Individual properties ==
- 3 Chesham Place, The entrance to the Embassy of Germany in Belgrave Square fronts on to 3, Chesham Place.
- 7 Chesham Place, High Commission of Lesotho.
- 9 Chesham Place, former studio of the milliner Simone Mirman.
- 10 Chesham Place, birthplace of Douglas Hogg, 1st Viscount Hailsham.
- 17 Chesham Place was converted to the Chesham Court apartments in the 1930s. Its residents have included Robin and Angela Fox, Peter Yates, Kenneth Hurren, Greta van Rantwyk, and Michael Wilding.
- 20 Chesham Place is the Thomson Belgravia Hotel, including the Hix Belgravia restaurant, operated by Mark Hix.
- 21 Chesham Place is a former British Telecom telephone exchange, converted into luxury flats by Foster + Partners.
- 25 Chesham Place, former home of Charles Wood, 1st Viscount Halifax.
- 27 Chesham Place, former home of the Marquess of Waterford.
- 28 Chesham Place, former home of the Conservative MP Malcolm St Clair.
- 30 and 31 Chesham Place, Chesham House, the home of the Russian Embassy from 1853 until the formation of the USSR in May 1927. access is at the rear on Chesham Close
- 34 Chesham Place, former home of the Conservative MP Christopher Turnor (1809–1886) and Sir William Richmond Brown, 2nd Baronet.
- 36 Chesham Place, site of Mrs Thatcher's office after leaving Downing Street. Town house of the Earl of Dalhousie from 1842, prior to his tenure as Governor-General of India.
- 37 Chesham Place, former home of the Duke of Bedford. A blue plaque marks it as the former home of John Russell, 1st Earl Russell (1792–1878).
- 38 Chesham Place is the Embassy of Finland. A Grade II listed building, it was previously known as Belgrave House and Herbert House. The British Red Cross and St John's War Organisation used the house during the Second World War (1939–1945) and then the Victoria League for Commonwealth Friendship leased 38 Chesham Place until 1975, when it became the Embassy of Finland. Former residents include:

- Major-General James Ahmuty
- William Russell, a member of the family of Lord John Russell
- Elizabeth Herbert, Baroness Herbert of Lea, widow of Sidney Herbert, 1st Baron Herbert of Lea, who died at Herbert House in 1911
- Aldred Lumley, 10th Earl of Scarbrough
- Irwin Boyle Laughlin (1871–1941) secretary of the American Embassy
- Gustavus William Hamilton-Russell, 9th Viscount Boyne.

- 39 Chesham Place is the Embassy of Spain
