= Wellington (Shropshire) (constituency) =

Parliamentary constituency in the United Kingdom, 1885–1918

- Former county constituency for the House of Commons

1885–1918
- Seats: one
- Created from: North Shropshire
- Replaced by: The Wrekin

Wellington (Shropshire) is a former United Kingdom Parliamentary constituency, formally known as The Mid (or Wellington) Division of Shropshire. It was a constituency of the House of Commons of the Parliament of the United Kingdom from 1885 to 1918. It elected one Member of Parliament.

== Members of Parliament ==
Election	Member	Party
1885	Alexander Brown	Liberal
1886	Alexander Brown	Liberal Unionist
1906	Charles Henry	Liberal
1918	Constituency abolished	

== Elections ==
=== Elections in the 1880s ===
A.H. Brown

General election 1885: Wellington
Party	Candidate	Votes	%	±%
Liberal	Alexander Brown	4,801	65.1	
Conservative	William Kenyon-Slaney	2,571	34.9	
Majority		2,230	30.2	
Turnout		7,372	85.2	
Registered electors		8,648		
Liberal win (new seat)				

General election 1886: Wellington
Party	Candidate	Votes	%	±%
Liberal Unionist	Alexander Brown	Unopposed		
Liberal Unionist gain from Liberal				

=== Elections in the 1890s ===
General election 1892: Wellington
Party	Candidate	Votes	%	±%
Liberal Unionist	Alexander Brown	3,963	59.7	N/A
Liberal	James Harris Sanders	2,680	40.3	New
Majority		1,283	19.4	N/A
Turnout		6,643	79.1	N/A
Registered electors		8,398		
Liberal Unionist hold		Swing	N/A	

General election 1895: Wellington
Party	Candidate	Votes	%	±%
Liberal Unionist	Alexander Brown	Unopposed		
Liberal Unionist hold				

=== Elections in the 1900s ===
General election 1900: Wellington
Party	Candidate	Votes	%	±%
Liberal Unionist	Alexander Brown	3,480	60.0	N/A
Liberal	Robert Varty	2,318	40.0	New
Majority		1,162	20.0	N/A
Turnout		5,798	68.8	N/A
Registered electors		8,427		
Liberal Unionist hold		Swing	N/A	

C.S. Henry

General election 1906: Wellington
Party	Candidate	Votes	%	±%
Liberal	Charles Henry	4,806	60.7	+20.7
Liberal Unionist	Hildebrand Harmsworth	3,114	39.3	−20.7
Majority		1,692	21.4	N/A
Turnout		7,920	89.2	+20.4
Registered electors		8,881		
Liberal gain from Liberal Unionist		Swing	+20.7	

=== Elections in the 1910s ===
General election January 1910: Wellington
Party	Candidate	Votes	%	±%
Liberal	Charles Henry	4,673	57.3	−3.4
Liberal Unionist	Charles Peevor Boileau Wood	3,484	42.7	+3.4
Majority		1,189	14.6	−6.8
Turnout		8,157	93.2	+4.0
Liberal hold		Swing	-3.4	

General election December 1910: Wellington
Party	Candidate	Votes	%	±%
Liberal	Charles Henry	4,404	57.3	0.0
Conservative	George Weld-Forester, 8th Baron Forester	3,286	42.7	0.0
Majority		1,118	14.6	0.0
Turnout		7,690	87.9	−5.3
Liberal hold		Swing		

General Election 1914–15:

Another General Election was required to take place before the end of 1915. The political parties had been making preparations for an election to take place and by July 1914, the following candidates had been selected;

- Liberal: Charles Henry
- Unionist:

== See also ==
- Parliamentary constituencies in Shropshire § Historical constituencies
- List of former United Kingdom Parliament constituencies
- Unreformed House of Commons
