= F. A. Mitchell-Hedges =

English adventurer, traveler, and writer (1882–1959)

- Born: Frederick Albert Mitchell-Hedges; 22 October 1882; London, England
- Died: 12 June 1959 (aged 76); Newton Abbot, England
- Other name: Mike Hedges
- Known for: Crystal Skull
- Spouse: Lillian Agnes (Dolly) Clarke
- Children: 1

Frederick Albert Mitchell-Hedges (sometimes known as Mike; 22 October 1882 – 12 June 1959) was an English adventurer, traveller and writer.

Mitchell-Hedges was known for his connection to the Mitchell-Hedges crystal skull, claimed to have been found with his adopted daughter Anna Mitchell-Hedges in Lubaantun, British Honduras (now Belize) in 1924. Archival evidence shows that the elder Mitchell-Hedges bought the skull at a Sotheby's auction in 1943, and other of his finds are also in question.

== Personal life ==
Born in London in 1882, Mitchell-Hedges attended school until he was 16. During his younger years, he worked for his father, John Hedges, in his stockbroking company. While Frederick expressed interest in exploring at a young age, John was against the idea of his son travelling, making their relationship a difficult one. After a trip to Canada, Frederick married Lillian Clarke in 1906. The two mostly lived apart from each other and whilst they had no children of their own they adopted Canadian orphan Anne Marie Le Guillon, today known as Anna Mitchell-Hedges. Mitchell-Hedges continued to travel well into his latter years until he died in 1959.

== Travels ==
Shortly following his 16th birthday, Mitchell-Hedges took his first trip with Brooke Mee on an expedition to Norway. The trip lasted three weeks and upon returning to London Mitchell-Hedges had high hopes of becoming an explorer.

After marrying Lillian, Mitchell-Hedges took a trip to Canada where he met and eventually adopted Anne Marie Le Guillon. He continued to travel through Northern and Central America. He found himself in Mexico where he was captured by Pancho Villa and worked as a spy, then in New York and back to Central America. Mitchell-Hedges also had a growing interest in the lost city of Atlantis which continued to influence his curiosity for travel.

While on his many excursions, Mitchell-Hedges repeatedly made claims of having "discovered" Indian tribes and "lost cities" that had already been documented years, sometimes centuries, before. In addition, Mitchell-Hedges made claims of finding "the cradle of civilisation" in the Mosquito Coast of Nicaragua, and stated that the Bay Islands of Honduras were remnants of the lost civilisation of Atlantis.

For a time in the 1930s the adventurist had a weekly radio show out of New York City on Sunday evenings. Talking over a background of "jungle drums", Mitchell-Hedges would tell dramatic tales of his trips, usually including narrow escapes from death at the hands of "savages" or from jungle animals ranging from a jaguar to a vicious attacking iguana.

== Findings ==
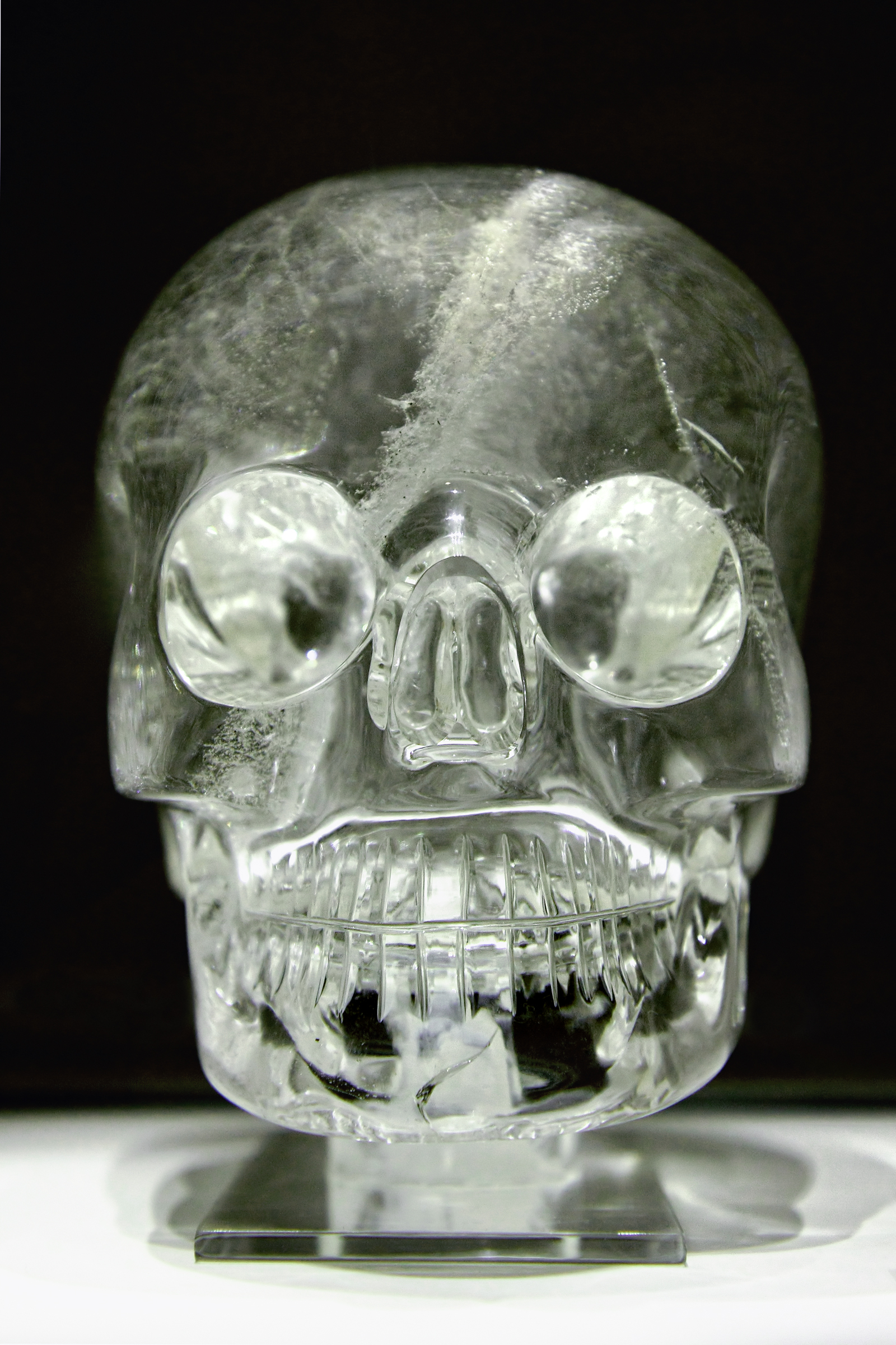
The crystal skull at the British Museum (ID Am1898,-.1 , similar in dimensions to the more detailed Mitchell-Hedges skull.

Among other findings, Mitchell-Hedges' claim to fame was his "discovery" of a "crystal skull". He claimed to have found it with his daughter Anna at the Maya ruin of Lubaantun while on an expedition to British Honduras (present-day Belize) in the 1920s. However, he made no record of the skull until the late 1940s, after a crystal skull was auctioned off by Sydney Burney at Sotheby's in October 1943. Moreover, in December 1943, F.A. Mitchell-Hedges disclosed in a letter to his brother that he had recently acquired the skull in an auction from Burney, paying £400. Controversies continued when identical measurements were found between Sotheby's skull and Mitchell-Hedges' skull, leaving the authenticity of this artifact questionable at best.

Mitchell-Hedges' crystal skull was retained in the possession of his adopted daughter until her death on 11 April 2007. Prior to her death, the skull was only shown to the public periodically, making it hard for the skull to be accessed and tested for authenticity.

Since Anna's death the skull has been examined thoroughly and despite many previous claims, the skull has been dated as post-Columbus era. Based on microscopic evidence, the skull's tool markings are a result of modern equipment and not of tools found in ancient Maya sites.

== Legacy ==
Mitchell-Hedges is said to have inspired the character Indiana Jones. However, neither George Lucas nor Steven Spielberg—co-creators of the successful concept and franchise—have indicated that any specific individual inspired their character, other than the generic stock heroes popularised in the matinée series and pulp magazines of the 1930s and 1940s.

== Published works ==
Books and other titles written by Mitchell-Hedges include:

- Battles With Giant Fish
- Danger, My Ally
- Land of Wonder and Fear

Concerning Land of Wonder and Fear, prominent British archaeologist J. Eric S. Thompson commented that "to me the wonder was how he could write such nonsense and the fear how much taller the next yarn would be".
