= Sir Alexander Brown, 1st Baronet =

British politician

Brown in 1895

Sir Alexander Hargreaves Brown, 1st Baronet (11 April 1844 – 12 March 1922) was an English Liberal Party, and later Liberal Unionist, politician who sat in the House of Commons from 1868 to 1906.

== Family ==
Brown was the third son of Alexander Brown, eldest son of Sir William Brown, 1st Baronet of Beilby Grange, Yorkshire and his wife Sarah Brown of New York. His nephew was The Viscount Ruffside, the WWII-era Speaker of the House of Commons.

Brown married Henrietta Agnes Terrell Blandy, fifth daughter of Charles Blandy of Madeira in 1876. Their eldest son Captain Gordon Hargreaves Brown was killed in action in the First World War. In 1910 Gordon Hargreaves Brown had married Edith Ivy Piggott, eldest daughter and co-heir of Admiral William Harvey Pigott. She assumed in 1925 the additional surname of Pigott for herself and her issue. Their son, the second Baronet, was killed in action in the Second World War.

== Career ==
He served in the 5th Dragoon Guards from 1864 to 1866. He was honorary colonel of the Lancashire and Cheshire Royal Garrison Artillery and was J. P. for Lancashire and Surrey.

== Politics ==
At the 1868 general election, Brown was elected unopposed as one of the two Members of Parliament (MPs) for the borough of Wenlock in Shropshire. He held the seat until it was abolished under the Redistribution of Seats Act 1885.

Brown was returned to the Commons at the 1885 general election as MP for the new Wellington division of Shropshire. He became a Liberal Unionist in 1886, and held the seat until he stood down at the 1906 general election.

Brown was created a Baronet of Broome Hall in Capel in the County of Surrey on 5 January 1903. He lived at Broome Hall Holmwood, Surrey and died at the age of 77.

== Arms ==
Coat of arms of Sir Alexander Brown, 1st Baronet

Crest
A bear's paw erased Argent issuant out of a wreath of oak Vert holding a sinister hand Proper.
Escutcheon
Quarterly 1st & 4th Gules a chevron Or between two bears' paws erased in chief Argent and four hands conjoined in saltire of the second in base a chief engrailed of the last thereon an eagle displayed Sable (Brown); 2nd & 3rd Ermine three fusils conjoined in fess Sable (Pigott).
Motto
Est Concordia Fratrum

== Notes ==
In the text above Broome Hall is situated in Holmwood, this is not accurate it is actually in Coldharbour in the parish of Capel.

Parliament of the United Kingdom
Preceded by James Milnes Gaskell; George Weld-Forester	Member of Parliament for Wenlock; 1868–1885; With: George Weld-Forester 1868–1874; Cecil Weld-Forester 1874–1885	constituency abolished
New constituency	Member of Parliament for Wellington; 1885–1906	Succeeded by Charles Henry
Baronetage of the United Kingdom
New creation	Baronet (of Broome Hall); 1903–1922	Succeeded by John Hargreaves Pigott-Brown
