= The Wrekin by-election, 1920 =

The Wrekin by-election, 1920 may refer to:

- The Wrekin by-election, 1920 (February), held on 7 February 1920
- The Wrekin by-election, 1920 (November), held on 20 November 1920
