= February 1920 The Wrekin by-election =

UK parliamentary by-election

- 7 February 1920 (Polling); 20 February 1920 (Declaration)
- Turnout: 71.0%
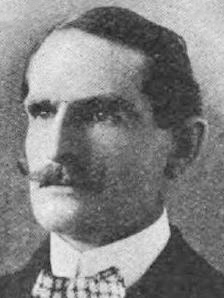
	Ind		Nat
Candidate	Charles Palmer	Charles Duncan	John Bayley
Party	Ind. Conservative	Labour	National Liberal
Alliance	Ind. Parliamentary Group		Coalition
Popular vote	9,267	8,729	4,750
Percentage	40.7%	38.4%	20.9%
Swing	New	New	▼79.1%
MP before election
Charles Henry
National Liberal
Subsequent MP
Charles Palmer
Ind. Conservative

The Wrekin by-election of February 1920 was held on 7 February 1920. The by-election was held due to the death of the incumbent Coalition Liberal MP, Sir Charles Henry Bt. It was won by the Independent Conservative candidate Charles Palmer, who was backed by Horatio Bottomley's Independent Parliamentary Group.

== Background ==
Although forced out of Parliament through bankruptcy in 1912, Bottomley had come back as an Independent in his old seat of Hackney South in 1918. He formed the Independent Parliamentary Group and sensed the growing unpopularity of the Coalition and the reluctance of many working men and women to give wholehearted support to a Labour Party still feared as introducing the novelty of socialism to British politics. Bottomley knew from his own brand of populist, jingoistic, politics that, as Palmer put it, "there is an immense body of sound opinion in the working classes which ranges itself on the side of King and Constitution." In this climate, Bottomley understood that here was an opportunity to try add create a new third force in Parliament, anticipating the upsurge of opinion which was to produce good results for Anti-Waste candidates in the coming months. He persuaded Palmer to stand for election in The Wrekin and in a three-cornered contest against a Coalition Liberal and a Labour candidate.

== Candidates ==
=== Coalition Liberal ===
- John Bayley, member of Salop County Council, chief organiser for Sir Charles Henry and principal of Wellington College

=== Labour ===
- Charles Duncan, former member for Barrow-in-Furness (1906–1918) and General Secretary of the Workers' Union

=== Independent Conservative ===
- Charles Palmer, journalist and newspaper editor

== Result ==
Palmer – without the advantages of local organisation or local connections and strongly supported by Bottomley himself – won a stunning and unexpected victory. The Coalition candidate, John Bayley, who had been closely associated with the previous MP and was well known locally as principal of Wellington College could only come in a poor third place.

The Wrekin by-election, 1920 (February)
Party		Candidate	Votes	%	±%
	Ind. Conservative	Charles Palmer	9,267	40.7	New
	Labour	Charles Duncan	8,729	38.4	New
C	National Liberal	John Bayley	4,750	20.9	N/A
Majority			538	2.3	N/A
Turnout			22,746	71.0	N/A
Registered electors					
	Ind. Conservative gain from National Liberal		Swing	N/A	
C indicates candidate endorsed by the coalition government.

== Aftermath ==
Palmer died on 25 October 1920 from double pneumonia and pleurisy after catching a chill during a visit to the Wrekin. Another by-election was held in November, also won by a Conservative opposed to the coalition, Charles Vere Ferrers Townshend.
