= Lonsdale (constituency) =

Parliamentary constituency in the United Kingdom, 1918–1950

- Former county constituency for the House of Commons
- County: Lancashire

1918–1950
- Seats: One
- Created from: Lancaster and North Lonsdale
- Replaced by: Morecambe and Lonsdale, Lancaster and Barrow-in-Furness

Lonsdale was a county constituency in north Lancashire, England. It returned one Member of Parliament (MP) to the House of Commons of the Parliament of the United Kingdom, elected by the first-past-the-post system.

== Members of Parliament ==
Year	Member	Whip
1918	Claude Lowther	Unionist
1920	Claude Lowther	Independent Parliamentary Group
1921	Claude Lowther	Unionist
1922	Nigel Kennedy	Unionist
1923	Henry Maden	Liberal
1924	Lord Balniel	Unionist
1940	Ian Fraser	Conservative
1950	constituency abolished	

== Elections ==
=== Election in the 1910s ===
General election 1918: Lonsdale
Party		Candidate	Votes	%	±%
C	Unionist	Claude Lowther	9,662	52.5	
	Labour	David Hunter	4,472	24.3	
	Liberal	Joseph Bliss	4,276	23.2	
Majority			5,190	28.2	
Turnout			18,410	66.5	
	Unionist win (new seat)				
C indicates candidate endorsed by the coalition government.

=== Election in the 1920s ===
General election 1922: Lonsdale
Party	Candidate	Votes	%	±%
Unionist	Nigel Kennedy	12,030	55.1	+2.6
Liberal	Henry Maden	5,790	26.5	+3.3
Labour	Thomas Marshall Scott	4,024	18.4	−5.9
Majority		6,240	28.6	+0.4
Turnout		21,844	77.3	+10.8
Unionist hold		Swing	-0.4	

General election 1923: Lonsdale
Party	Candidate	Votes	%	±%
Liberal	Henry Maden	11,186	52.4	+25.9
Unionist	Nigel Kennedy	10,176	47.6	−7.5
Majority		1,010	4.8	N/A
Turnout		21,362	75.4	−1.9
Liberal gain from Unionist		Swing	+16.7	

General election 1924: Lonsdale
Party	Candidate	Votes	%	±%
Unionist	David Lindsay	13,460	57.4	+9.8
Liberal	Henry Maden	10,002	42.6	−−9.8
Majority		3,458	14.8	19.6
Turnout		23,462	83.3	+7.9
Unionist gain from Liberal		Swing	+9.8	

General election 1929: Lonsdale
Party	Candidate	Votes	%	±%
Unionist	David Lindsay	13,612	47.4	−10.0
Liberal	Henry Maden	7,805	27.2	−15.4
Labour	Joseph Henderson	7,303	25.4	New
Majority		5,087	20.2	+5.4
Turnout		28,720	82.7	−0.6
Unionist hold		Swing	+2.7	

=== Election in the 1930s ===
General election 1931: Lonsdale
Party	Candidate	Votes	%	±%
Conservative	David Lindsay	17,423	59.6	+12.2
Liberal	Henry Maden	11,821	40.4	+13.2
Majority		5,602	19.2	−1.0
Turnout		29,244	83.0	+0.3
Conservative hold		Swing	-0.5	

General election 1935: Lonsdale
Party	Candidate	Votes	%	±%
Conservative	David Lindsay	16,338	57.0	−2.6
Labour	R S Armstrong	6,946	24.2	New
Liberal	Henry Maden	5,391	18.8	−21.6
Majority		9,392	32.8	+13.6
Turnout		28,675	79.3	−3.7
Conservative hold		Swing		

=== Elections in the 1940s ===
General Election 1939–40:

Another General Election was required to take place before the end of 1940. The political parties had been making preparations for an election to take place from 1939 and by the end of this year, the following candidates had been selected;

- Conservative: David Lindsay
- Labour:
- Liberal:

1940 Lonsdale by-election
Party	Candidate	Votes	%	±%
Conservative	Ian Fraser	Unopposed	N/A	N/A
Conservative hold				

General election 1945: Lonsdale
Party	Candidate	Votes	%	±%
Conservative	Ian Fraser	18,571	58.0	+1.0
Labour	Sidney Wright Grundy	13,436	42.0	+17.8
Majority		5,135	16.0	−16.8
Turnout		32,007	77.2	−2.1
Conservative hold		Swing		

== Sources ==
- Leigh Rayment's Historical List of MPs – Constituencies beginning with "L" (part 4)
