= David Lindsay, 28th Earl of Crawford =

British Unionist politician (1900–1975)

The Right Honourable The Earl of Crawford and Balcarres KT GBE DL FRSE
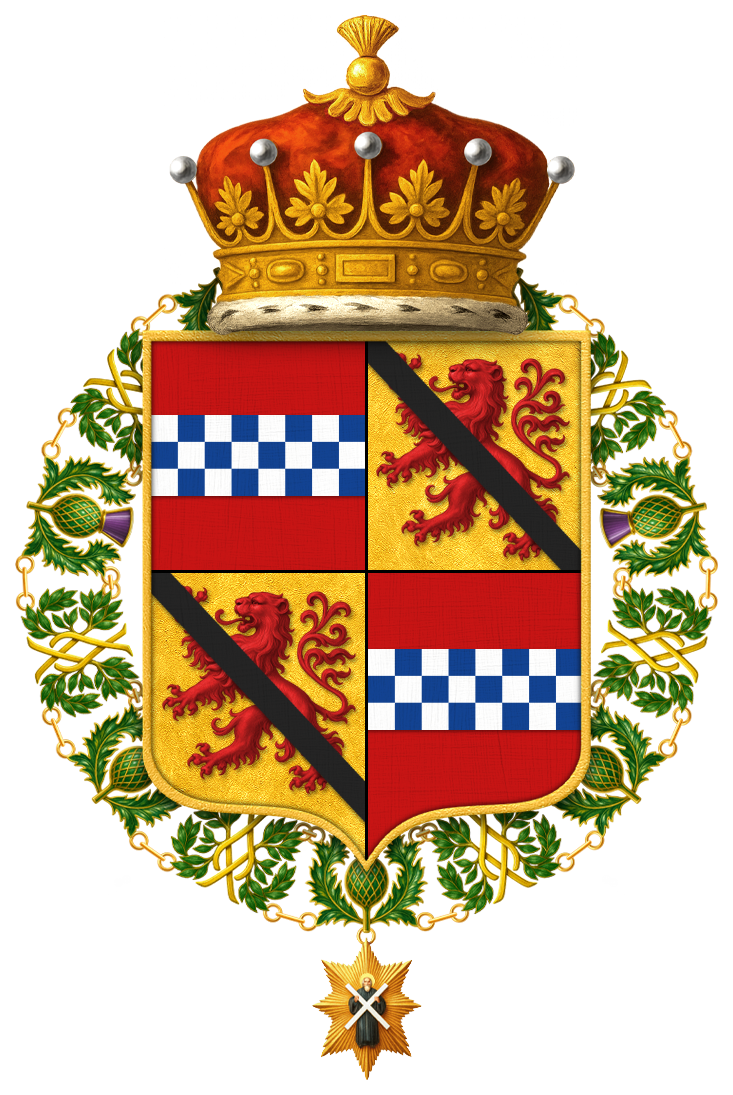

Member of the House of Lords Lord Temporal
- In office 9 March 1940 – 13 December 1975; Hereditary Peerage
- Preceded by: The 27th Earl of Crawford
- Succeeded by: The 29th Earl of Crawford

Member of Parliament for Lonsdale
- In office 30 October 1924 – 8 March 1940
- Preceded by: Henry Maden
- Succeeded by: Sir Ian Fraser

Personal details
- Born: 20 November 1900
- Died: 13 December 1975 (aged 75)
- Spouse: Mary Katherine Cavendish (m. 1925)
- Children: 3
- Parent: David Lindsay, 27th Earl of Crawford (father)
- Education: Eton College
- Alma mater: Magdalen College, Oxford

David Alexander Robert Lindsay, 28th Earl of Crawford and 11th Earl of Balcarres, KT, GBE, DL, FRSE (20 November 1900 – 13 December 1975), known as Lord Balniel from 1913 to 1940, was a British Unionist politician.

== Life ==
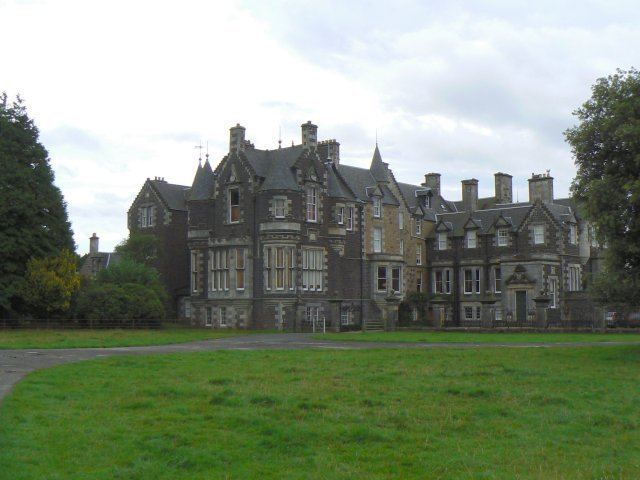
Balcarres House

Lindsay was born at 49 Moray Place in western Edinburgh on 20 November 1900, the eldest son of the 27th Earl of Crawford and 10th Earl of Balcarres and his wife, Constance Lilian Perry.

He was educated at Eton, graduated from Magdalen College, Oxford in 1922 and entered the House of Commons as Member of Parliament (MP) for Lonsdale two years later, at the 1924 general election. He held his seat until he succeeded to his father's titles in May 1940 and was also Parliamentary Private Secretary to the Ministry of Agriculture, Fisheries and Food in 1924 and to the Ministry of Health from 1931 to 1940.

In 1951, Lord Crawford was made a Knight Grand Cross of the Order of the British Empire for his services to the Arts, having been a trustee of the Tate Gallery from 1932 to 1937, the National Gallery from 1935 to 1941, 1945–52 and 1953–60, the British Museum from 1940 to 1973 and a member of the Standing Commission on Museums and Galleries from 1937 to 1952, Chairman of the Trustees of the National Galleries of Scotland from 1952 to 1972, the Royal Fine Arts Commission from 1943 to 1957 and the Trustees of the National Library of Scotland in 1944.

In 1953 he was elected a Fellow of the Royal Society of Edinburgh. His proposers were John F. Allen, David Jack, Edward Copson, and Daniel Edwin Rutherford. In 1954, he was elected an International Member of the American Philosophical Society. He was awarded the Order of the Thistle in 1955 for his time spent as Rector of the University of St Andrews from 1952 to 1955.

From 1945 to 1965 he was chairman of the National Trust. From 1963 until his death, he also acted as Premier Earl of Scotland.

He died at Balcarres House, near Colinsburgh in Fife on 13 December 1975. He is buried in the family chapel at Balcarres House.

== Family ==
On 9 December 1925, the then Lord Balniel married Mary Katherine Cavendish, third daughter of Lord Richard Frederick Cavendish (younger brother of Victor Cavendish, 9th Duke of Devonshire). They had three sons:

- Robert Alexander Lindsay, 29th Earl of Crawford (5 March 1927 – 2023)
- The Hon. Patrick Lindsay (14 November 1928 – 1986)
- The Hon. Thomas Richard Lindsay (18 February 1937 – 2020)

Lord Crawford died in 1975, aged 75 and his titles passed to his eldest son, Robert.

Parliament of the United Kingdom
Preceded by Henry Maden	Member of Parliament for Lonsdale; 1924–1940	Succeeded by Sir Ian Fraser
Academic offices
Preceded by Lord Burghley	Rector of the University of St Andrews; 1952–1955	Succeeded by The Viscount Kilmuir
Peerage of Scotland
Preceded by David Lindsay	Earl of Crawford; Earl of Balcarres; 1940–1975	Succeeded by Robert Lindsay
