= Robert Andrew Allison =

English politician (1838–1926)

Robert Andrew Allison

Sir Robert Andrew Allison (3 March 1838 – 15 January 1926) was an English Liberal politician who sat in the House of Commons from 1885 to 1900.

Allison was the son of Joseph Allison of Eden Morent Carlisle and his wife Jane Andrew. He was educated at Rugby School and at Trinity College, Cambridge. He was a director of the Midland Railway. In 1885, he was elected as MP for Eskdale and held the seat until 1900. He was J.P. and Deputy Lieutenant for Cumberland and was High Sheriff of Cumberland in 1908. He was knighted in 1910.

Allison was the author of several works including

- Essays and Addresses 1913
- Belgium in History 1914
- Cicero in Old Age 1916
- Translations into English Verse ..Greek Anthology 1922

Allison lived at Scaleby Hall, Carlisle, where he died at the age of 87.

Allison married Laura Alicia Milner Atkinson in 1867 as his first wife.

== Election contests ==
General election 1885: Eskdale
Party	Candidate	Votes	%	±%
Liberal	Robert Allison	4,749	60.0	n/a
Conservative	S P Foster	3,163	40.0	n/a
Majority		1,586	20.0	n/a
Turnout				n/a
Liberal win (new seat)				

General election 1886: Eskdale
Party	Candidate	Votes	%	±%
Liberal	Robert Allison	4,112	56.0	
Conservative	James Lowther	3,226	44.0	
Majority		886	12.0	
Turnout			73.4	
Liberal hold		Swing		

General election 1892: Eskdale
Party	Candidate	Votes	%	±%
Liberal	Robert Allison	3,976	55.7	
Liberal Unionist	Henry Howard	3,163	44.3	
Majority		813	11.4	
Turnout			75.9	
Liberal hold		Swing		

General election 1895: Eskdale
Party	Candidate	Votes	%	±%
Liberal	Robert Allison	3,745	51.0	−4.6
Liberal Unionist	Henry Howard	3,598	49.0	+4.6
Majority		147	2.0	−9.4
Turnout			76.5	+0.6
Liberal hold		Swing	-4.6	

General election 1900: Eskdale
Party	Candidate	Votes	%	±%
Conservative	Claude Lowther	4,052	54.7	
Liberal	Robert Allison	3,349	45.3	
Majority		703	9.4	
Turnout			73.6	
Conservative gain from Liberal		Swing		

Parliament of the United Kingdom
Preceded by see East Cumberland constituency West Cumberland constituency	Member of Parliament for Eskdale; New constituency 1885–1900	Succeeded by Claude Lowther
