= Charles Palmer (journalist) =

British journalist and newspaper editor

Member of Parliament for The Wrekin
- In office 20 February 1920 – 25 October 1920
- Preceded by: Charles Henry
- Succeeded by: Charles Townshend

Personal details
- Born: Charles Frederick Palmer; 9 September 1869
- Died: 25 October 1920 (aged 51)
- Party: Independent Conservative
- Other political affiliations: Independent Parliamentary Group
- Spouse: Annie Smith
- Children: 1
- Occupation: Journalist

Charles Frederick Palmer (9 September 1869 – 25 October 1920) was a British journalist and newspaper editor, closely associated at the end of his career with the politician and business fraudster Horatio Bottomley. Palmer sat briefly in the House of Commons after winning a by-election as an Independent in February 1920.

== Career ==
Palmer started his career in newspapers at the St James's Gazette. He then joined the staff of The Globe and was one of its Parliamentary reporters from 1886 to 1915. At one time he was a member of the Parliamentary Press Gallery. He became editor of The Globe in 1912 and held that post until 1915. On 6 November 1915, while Palmer was still editor of The Globe, the paper was suspended under the Defence of the Realm Act for repeating the statement that Lord Kitchener had tendered his resignation as War Secretary even though this had been officially denied by the press bureau. It resumed publication a fortnight later but Palmer was removed from the editor's chair by the paper's owner Dudley Docker. Palmer's journalistic association with Horatio Bottomley was cemented when he took over as Assistant Editor of John Bull . He also had joint editorial control with Bottomley of the publications, National News and Sunday Evening Telegram. Palmer was also drama and music critic of The People for 20 years. He was one of the founders of the Society of Dramatic Critics which subsequently merged with the Critics Circle of the Institute of Journalists and was a member of its main organising committee. Palmer's other achievements included being associated with journalist and editor Kennedy Jones in raising the £1,000,000,000 Victory Loan and was credited as being the originator of the idea which resulted in the formation of Dudley Docker's Federation of British Industries.

== Politics ==
Palmer's former career as a Parliamentary reporter had given him a taste for political affairs and his association with Horatio Bottomley provided him an opportunity to become involved in political activity in his own right. In 1919, the sitting Coalition Liberal MP for the Shropshire seat of The Wrekin, Sir Charles Henry died causing a by-election. Henry had been returned unopposed at the 1918 general election as a supporter of the Coalition government of David Lloyd George but by 1920 the tide was turning against the coalition. The government had lost six Parliamentary by-elections since March 1919, three to the Liberals and three to Labour.

Although forced out of Parliament through bankruptcy in 1912, Bottomley had come back as an independent in his old seat of Hackney South in 1918. He formed the Independent Parliamentary Group and sensed the growing unpopularity of the Coalition and the reluctance of many working men and women to give wholehearted support to a Labour Party still feared as introducing the novelty of socialism to British politics. Bottomley knew from his own brand of populist, jingoistic, politics that, as Palmer put it, "there is an immense body of sound opinion in the working classes which ranges itself on the side of King and Constitution." In this climate, Bottomley understood that here was an opportunity to try add create a new third force in Parliament, anticipating the upsurge of opinion which was to produce good results for Anti-Waste candidates in the coming months. He persuaded Palmer to stand for election in The Wrekin and in a three-cornered contest against a Coalition Liberal and a Labour candidate, Palmer – without the advantages of local organisation or local connections and strongly supported by Bottomley himself – won a stunning and unexpected victory. He topped the poll with 9,267 votes, (40.7% of the poll), a majority of 538 over Labour's Charles Duncan who received 8,729 votes (38.4%). The Coalition candidate, John Bayley, who had been closely associated with the previous MP and was well known locally as principal of Wellington College could only come in a poor third place with 4,750 votes (20.9%).

Palmer took on the representation of the Actor's Association, a forerunner of Equity, during his brief time in Parliament.

== Death ==
Palmer died in London at the comparatively early age of 51 on 25 October 1920. He had caught a chill during a visit to his constituency and developed double pneumonia and pleurisy. He was survived by his wife, Annie Dudley Palmer (née Smith) and their one daughter.

== See also ==
List of United Kingdom MPs with the shortest service

Parliament of the United Kingdom
Preceded by Sir Charles Henry	Member of Parliament for The Wrekin; February 1920 – November 1920	Succeeded by Charles Townshend
