= 1940 Lonsdale by-election =

UK Parliamentary by-election

The 1940 Lonsdale by-election was held on 12 April 1940. The by-election was held due to the succession to the peerage of the incumbent Conservative MP, David Lindsay. It was won by the Conservative candidate Ian Fraser.
