= Pink and Blue (Renoir) =

1881 painting by Auguste Renoir

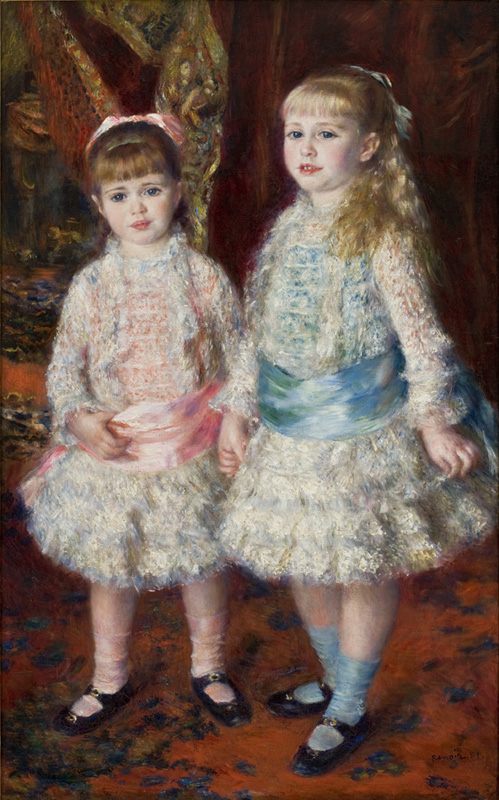
- Artist: Pierre-Auguste Renoir
- Year: 1881
- Medium: oil on canvas
- Movement: Impressionism
- Dimensions: 119 cm × 74 cm (47 in × 29 in)
- Location: São Paulo Museum of Art, Brazil

Alice and Elisabeth Cahen d’Anvers (most commonly referred to as Pink and Blue) is an oil painting by French impressionist Pierre-Auguste Renoir. Produced in Paris in 1881, the painting depicts the sisters Alice and Elisabeth, daughters of Louise Cahen d'Anvers and her husband the Jewish banker Louis Raphaël Cahen d'Anvers. It is considered one of the most popular works in the collection of the São Paulo Museum of Art, where it has been conserved since 1952.

== Alice and Elisabeth Cahen d’Anvers ==
Renoir portrayed the two daughters of Louise Cahen d'Anvers and her banker husband Louis Raphaël Cahen d'Anvers, the blonde, Elisabeth, born in December 1874, and the younger, Alice, in February 1876, when they were respectively six and five years old. The artist produced many portraits for the families of the Parisian Jewish community at the time, and Louis Cahen d'Anvers, who married Louise de Morpurgo, descendant of a rich family from Trieste, was one of the most wealthy.

Renoir was commissioned to paint many portraits for this family, which he had met through the collector Charles Ephrussi, who was proprietor of the Gazette des Beaux-Arts and also Louise's lover. The idea was to make individual portraits of each daughter. Renoir portrayed the couple's oldest daughter, Irene, in the painting Little Irène, nowadays conserved at the Foundation E.G. Bührle, in Zürich. Afterwards, the family decided that the other two sisters would be painted together. Louise paid Renoir 1,500 francs for the painting.

According to Camesasca, there were many sitting sessions until the end of February 1881, after which Renoir went to Algiers. After some decades, the youngest of the models would remember that "the boredom of the sitting sessions was recompensed by the pleasure of wearing the elegant lace dress".

In 1895, Alice married the British Army officer Charles Vere Ferrers Townshend who led his command to its destruction at Kut al Amara in 1916. Alice lived until 1965 and died in Nice, aged 89. Elisabeth had a tragic destiny. After divorcing from her first husband, the diplomat and count Jean de Forceville, she married Alfred Émile Denfert Rochereau, whom she later divorced as well. In 1987, during an exhibition of the São Paulo Museum of Art collection in the Fondation Pierre Gianadda in Martigny, Switzerland, Elisabeth's nephew, Jean de Monbrison, wrote a letter to the museum reporting her sad end: although she was converted to Catholicism at a young age, she was sent to Auschwitz because of her Jewish descent and died on the way to the concentration camp in March 1944, aged 69.

== See also ==
- List of paintings by Pierre-Auguste Renoir
