= Henry Maden =

English barrister and Liberal politician

Henry Maden (31 March 1892 – 17 November 1960) was an English barrister and Liberal politician.

== Family and education ==
Henry Maden was the son of Sir Henry Maden from Bacup in Lancashire. He was educated privately and attended Exeter College, Oxford where he obtained his Bachelor of Arts degree. In 1923 he married Alice Fletcher from Holmfirth.

== Career ==
Maden went in for the law and was called to the Bar at the Middle Temple in 1916.

== Politics ==
Maden contested the Lonsdale Division of Lancashire at the 1922 general election. In a three-cornered contest he came second to the Conservative candidate Capt Nigel Kennedy, with Labour’s T M Scott third. However, in 1923 with the Liberal Party reunited after years of schism between Lloyd George and Asquithian factions and Labour not entering the field, Maden gained Lonsdale from Kennedy with a majority of 1,010 votes.

By 1924 the Conservatives were resurgent and Maden lost his seat in a straight fight to the new Tory candidate Lord Balniel. He tried to regain Lonsdale in 1929, in 1931 and in 1935 but without success. He did not stand for Parliament again.

== Death ==
Henry Maden died aged 68 years on 17 November 1960.

Parliament of the United Kingdom
Preceded by Capt Nigel Kennedy	Member of Parliament for Lonsdale; 1923 – 1924	Succeeded by Lord Balniel
