= Eskdale (constituency) =

Parliamentary constituency in the United Kingdom, 1885–1918

- Former county constituency for the House of Commons

1885–1918
- Seats: one
- Created from: East Cumberland
- Replaced by: North Cumberland and Workington

Eskdale was a parliamentary constituency centred on the Eskdale, district of north Cumberland not to be confused with the valley of Eskdale in the west of the county. It returned one Member of Parliament (MP) to the House of Commons of the Parliament of the United Kingdom, elected by the first past the post system.

== History ==
The constituency was created by the Redistribution of Seats Act 1885 for the 1885 general election, and abolished for the 1918 general election.

== Boundaries ==
The Municipal Borough of Carlisle, the Sessional Divisions of Cumberland Ward, Eskdale Ward, and Longtown, and part of the Sessional Division of Allerdale Ward below Derwent.

== Members of Parliament ==
Election	Member	Party
1885	Robert Andrew Allison	Liberal
1900	Claude Lowther	Conservative
1906	Geoffrey Howard	Liberal
1910	Claude Lowther	Conservative
1918	Claude Lowther	constituency abolished

== Elections ==
=== Elections in the 1880s ===
General election 1885: Eskdale
Party	Candidate	Votes	%	±%
Liberal	Robert Andrew Allison	4,749	60.0	
Conservative	Samuel Porter Foster	3,163	40.0	
Majority		1,586	20.0	
Turnout		7,912	79.1	
Registered electors		10,000		
Liberal win (new seat)				

General election 1886: Eskdale
Party	Candidate	Votes	%	±%
Liberal	Robert Andrew Allison	4,112	56.0	−4.0
Conservative	James Lowther	3,226	44.0	+4.0
Majority		886	12.0	−8.0
Turnout		7,338	73.4	−5.7
Registered electors		10,000		
Liberal hold		Swing	−4.0	

=== Elections in the 1890s ===
General election 1892: Eskdale
Party	Candidate	Votes	%	±%
Liberal	Robert Andrew Allison	3,976	55.7	−0.3
Liberal Unionist	Henry Howard	3,163	44.3	+0.3
Majority		813	11.4	−0.6
Turnout		7,139	75.9	+2.5
Registered electors		9,402		
Liberal hold		Swing	+0.3	

Robert Allison

General election 1895: Eskdale
Party	Candidate	Votes	%	±%
Liberal	Robert Andrew Allison	3,745	51.0	−4.7
Liberal Unionist	Henry Howard	3,598	49.0	+4.7
Majority		147	2.0	−9.4
Turnout		7,343	76.5	+0.6
Registered electors		9,603		
Liberal hold		Swing	-4.7	

=== Elections in the 1900s ===
General election 1900: Eskdale
Party	Candidate	Votes	%	±%
Conservative	Claude Lowther	4,052	54.7	+5.7
Liberal	Robert Andrew Allison	3,349	45.3	−5.7
Majority		703	9.4	N/A
Turnout		7,401	73.6	−2.9
Registered electors		10,054		
Conservative gain from Liberal		Swing	+5.7	

General election 1906: Eskdale
Party	Candidate	Votes	%	±%
Liberal	Geoffrey Howard	4,467	51.4	+6.1
Conservative	Claude Lowther	4,230	48.6	−6.1
Majority		237	2.8	N/A
Turnout		8,697	80.4	+6.8
Registered electors		10,811		
Liberal gain from Conservative		Swing	+6.1	

=== Elections in the 1910s ===
General election January 1910: Eskdale
Party	Candidate	Votes	%	±%
Liberal	Geoffrey Howard	4,504	50.2	−1.2
Conservative	Claude Lowther	4,470	49.8	+1.2
Majority		34	0.4	−2.4
Turnout		8,974	81.5	+1.1
Liberal hold		Swing	-1.2	

General election December 1910: Eskdale
Party	Candidate	Votes	%	±%
Conservative	Claude Lowther	4,581	52.1	+2.3
Liberal	Geoffrey Howard	4,211	47.9	−2.3
Majority		370	4.2	+3.8
Turnout		8,792	79.8	−1.7
Conservative gain from Liberal		Swing	+2.3	

General Election 1914–15:

Another General Election was required to take place before the end of 1915. The political parties had been making preparations for an election to take place and by July 1914, the following candidates had been selected;

- Unionist: Claude Lowther
- Liberal: George Schuster

== See also ==
- Parliamentary franchise in the United Kingdom 1885–1918
