= Nigel Kennedy (politician) =

British barrister, army officer, and politician (1889–1964)

Myles Storr Nigel Kennedy (12 October 1889 – 19 January 1964) was a British barrister, army officer, and politician. He served a single term in Parliament as a Conservative Member of Parliament (MP), but never contributed to any debate. He was a member of Lancashire County Council for nearly twenty years. His Military and political career came to a premature end when his colourful private life brought about a court judgment against him and resulted in his bankruptcy.

He was the last proprietor of Roanhead mines, which he managed from 1914 until they were worked out in July 1942.

== Early life ==
Kennedy's father, Myles Burton Kennedy, was a Deputy Lieutenant and High Sheriff of Lancashire who lived in Stone Cross near Ulverston in the Furness or North Lonsdale area of the county. Kennedy was his eldest son and was born in Ulverston in 1889. He attended Harrow School before going up to Trinity College, Cambridge. He was admitted to the degree of a Bachelor of Arts in 1911, and proceeded to the degree of Master of Arts in 1916. After leaving Cambridge, Kennedy began to study law through the Council of Legal Education.

In 1912 Kennedy was commissioned as a Second Lieutenant in the Special Reserve of Officers for the 3rd Battalion, the Border Regiment. He served in the regiment during the Great War, being mentioned in dispatches, but also suffering from shell shock. He finished the war having been promoted to captain. After resuming his legal studies, in 1920 he was called to the Bar by the Inner Temple.

== 1922 election ==
The sitting Member of Parliament for the Lonsdale division of Lancashire, Col. Claude Lowther, had been elected as a supporter of the Lloyd George Coalition in 1918, but in July 1921 had ceased to support it and aligned with Horatio Bottomley. As a result, the local Conservative association sought a new candidate and Kennedy was adopted in October 1921.

When the general election of 1922 was called, Lowther stood down on health grounds. At his adoption meeting at Ulverston on 28 October, Kennedy declared he stood for the broadest principles of the Conservative Party, with a broad-minded view of modern conditions. He spoke at Dalton Co-operative Hall on 30 October, where he was heckled; challenged to support full maintenance for the unemployed, Kennedy said that the country could not afford it. He issued an election address calling for the "fostering of private initiative and enterprise". He wanted a reduction of taxation and rating on farmers, and opposed local option. He supported a contributory scheme for state old age pensions. At a meeting in Ulverston on 4 November where many of the audience were unemployed, Kennedy called for industry entirely free from Government interference, and for private enterprise to build the homes needed in Britain.

== Defeat ==
Kennedy easily won his seat, obtaining more than twice as many votes as his nearest rival in a three-way contest. He took the oath on 21 November 1922, and was named to Standing Committee B on 6 March 1923, but had never spoken in the Chamber, nor asked a question, by the time Parliament was suddenly dissolved a year later and he had to defend his seat. Kennedy's only recorded contribution to debate came on 24 April 1923 when he spoke on Clause 8 of the Salmon and Freshwater Fisheries Bill in Standing Committee B. He asked whether the Bill would allow fishery boards to take action against pollution of watercourses in his Lake District constituency by motor boats. The Minister said it would.

His lack of activity was not prominently raised in the local campaign during the 1923 general election, but at the Dalton Co-operative Hall his arrival was greeted with cries of "The silent Member" and "When are you going to make your maiden speech?" amid the applause. Kennedy said he hoped to make his maiden speech shortly, if re-elected.

Kennedy faced a single opponent from the Liberal Party. The Times's correspondent thought that the farming policy of the government was crucial, despite the presence of industrial centres in some towns, and so Kennedy would depend on the agricultural vote. The Conservative policy of protectionism, which Kennedy strongly supported was unpopular with farmers. At an Ulverston meeting on 29 November 1923, Kennedy had to field many hostile questions on the subject. Kennedy was defeated by 1,010 votes.

== Later life ==
In the county council elections of 1922, Kennedy had been elected to Lancashire County Council. He was elected a County Alderman in 1927. He formally left the Army at the end of 1929, receiving the rank of Major. In June 1935, Kennedy spoke at Lancashire County Council in support of an appeal to local authorities in the county to subscribe to the Lancashire Playing-fields Association, saying that the county council would follow. Suffering a recurrence of shell shock in 1935, his health broke down and he entered a nursing home. In May of the following year he attended the Old Harrovian dinner.

=== Breach of promise ===
Kennedy's personal life brought him financial disaster in 1941. The story accepted by the court was that in January 1940 Kennedy had met Marie Harrison, head barmaid at the Grand Hotel in Leicester, telling her that he was wealthy enough to pay £1,200 a year in surtax. He swiftly proposed marriage, and eventually she accepted and left her job; while he arranged for a chaperone when they went away for a trip north, the chaperone left and Kennedy seduced Harrison. On a later trip to London where Kennedy was having his portrait painted, a woman at the studio remarked "I never know where I am with Nigel's girl friends". Kennedy replied "There is safety in numbers. I am a confirmed bachelor", and on being reminded by Harrison that they were engaged, said "I can easily get out of that." Kennedy had broken off their engagement when leaving Fortnum & Mason with another girl, telling Harrison "Don't talk to me. I am a corpse." Kennedy did not attend the court and judgment for breach of promise was entered against him in default of his appearance. The judge, Mr Justice Croom-Johnson, referred the case to the Official Referee who on 13 January 1941 ordered Kennedy to pay £2,000 damages, with costs.

As he was unable to pay, on Friday 17 January 1941 an auction of Kennedy's belongings (including antique furniture, books, a Rover saloon car, and a wireless set) was held in Ulverston. On 17 March 1941, Kennedy was adjudicated a bankrupt on a petition by his creditor. The bankruptcy disqualified him from serving as an Alderman, and lasted for seven years (extended from the usual five). After the war, Kennedy married Dorothy Emerson-Millington in 1946. Kennedy died in Barrow-in-Furness Hospital in January 1964, having been ill for some time.

Parliament of the United Kingdom
Preceded by Col. Claude Lowther	Member of Parliament for Lonsdale; 1922 – 1923	Succeeded by Henry Maden
