= Claude Lowther =

British politician

Colonel Claude Lowther

Member of Parliament for Lonsdale
- In office 1918–1922
- Preceded by: New constituency
- Succeeded by: Nigel Kennedy

Member of Parliament for Eskdale
- In office 1910–1918
- Preceded by: Geoffrey Howard
- Succeeded by: Constituency abolished
- In office 1900–1906
- Preceded by: Robert Andrew Allison
- Succeeded by: Geoffrey Howard

Personal details
- Born: Claude William Henry Lowther c. 1870
- Died: 16 June 1929 (aged 58–59)
- Relations: William Lowther, 2nd Earl of Lonsdale (grandfather); Toupie Lowther (sister)
- Parent(s): Francis William Lowther; Louise Beatrice de Fonblanque
- Education: Rugby School

Colonel Claude William Henry Lowther (26 June 1870 – 16 June 1929) was an English Conservative politician.

== Early life ==
Lowther was the only son of Capt. Francis William Lowther and Louise Beatrice de Fonblanque; Francis William was the illegitimate son of William Lowther, 2nd Earl of Lonsdale and Emilia Cressotti, an Italian opera singer, and received £125,000 on the Earl's death. His sister was the tennis player Toupie Lowther, whom he encouraged to form an all-female unit supporting the French Army during the First World War.

He was educated at Rugby School and had a brief diplomatic career as honorary attaché at Madrid from 1894.

== Career ==
He was commissioned a second lieutenant in the Westmorland and Cumberland Yeomanry of the British Army on 17 May 1899. Following the outbreak of the Second Boer War later that year, he signed up for service with the Imperial Yeomanry, where on 3 February 1900 he was appointed a Lieutenant in the 8th Battalion. During a skirmish at Faber's Put on 30 March 1900, he and two troopers rescued two wounded men while under heavy Boer Fire, an act for which he was unsuccessfully recommended for the Victoria Cross (VC) by Sir Charles Warren.

In September 1914, a month after the outbreak of the Great War, he raised and equipped the 11th, 12th, and 13th (Service) Battalions of the Royal Sussex Regiment, who became known as "Lowther's Lambs", and, together with the 14th (Service) Battalion of the Hampshire Regiment, formed the 116th Brigade of the 39th Division. His recruiting was highly successful, enlisting men who were volunteering for Kitchener's Army from the South Downs already bound to one another by community ties. However, Lowther, like most who raised service battalions, was not to command them in action. He returned to Herstmonceux, while his "Lambs", after arriving on the Western Front earlier in the year, were terribly damaged in their first attack on 30 June 1916, intended to divert attention from the offensive on the Somme.

=== Political career ===
In October 1900, at the "Khaki Election", he was elected Unionist member of parliament for Eskdale. During the last months of the Boer War on 10 July 1901, Lowther made a speech advocating extracting reparations from the Transvaal, using mineral deposits to compensate for high British taxes needed to pay for the war.

He was defeated in 1906 by the Liberal candidate, Geoffrey Howard. After his defeat, he became a vigorous campaigner against socialism and for the preservation of Empire. Lowther favoured tariff reform and "national efficiency", including state welfare. From 1908 until 1911, he was chairman of the Anti-Socialist Union. Defeated again in Eskdale at the January 1910 election, he regained the seat in December 1910.

In Parliament, he called for both military and industrial conscription, and for the creation of a volunteer army of veterans past the age of service. Lowther followed the philosophy of Milner in admiring the patriotic dedication of the working class.

Having announced that he would not stand again in North Cumberland, which was won unopposed in 1918 by the distantly related Christopher Lowther, he became MP for Lonsdale. He favoured large indemnity payments from Germany, and supported the Anti-Waste League, and, less fortunately, Horatio Bottomley. He was among the MPs who voted to end the coalition with David Lloyd George at the Carlton Club meeting brought on by the Chanak Crisis.

In the 1922 General Election he did not stand for re-election in Lonsdale on health grounds, but was a last minute nominee for Carlisle. In 1918 the Conservatives had not contested this traditionally Liberal seat, to ensure Labour did not win. The local party proposed to do the same again, but an internal coup led to Lowther's selection. In a brief but vigorous campaign he pushed the sitting Liberal into third place, and the Labour candidate took the seat. This proved to be the end of Claude Lowther's political career.

== Personal life ==
Aside from his political career, Lowther was also a connoisseur and a student of the theatre, and a friend of Herbert Beerbohm Tree. Lowther's play The Gordian Knot was presented at Her Majesty's Theatre in 1903, but was not at all successful. The episode, however, did not bring about a breach between Lowther and Tree. He bought Herstmonceux Castle in 1911 and began restoring it in 1912. The inhabitable parts were refurnished and stocked with objets d'art.

His health gradually failed, and Lowther died at his London home in 1929. After his death, the collection he had assembled at Herstmonceux was sold off, and the castle itself sold to Reginald Lawson.

Parliament of the United Kingdom
Preceded by Robert Andrew Allison	Member of Parliament for Eskdale; 1900–1906	Succeeded by Geoffrey Howard
Preceded by Geoffrey Howard	Member of Parliament for Eskdale; December 1910 – 1918	Constituency abolished
New constituency	Member of Parliament for Lonsdale; 1918–1922	Succeeded by Capt. Nigel Kennedy
