= November 1920 The Wrekin by-election =

UK parliamentary by-election

- 20 November 1920

Candidate	Townshend	Duncan
Party	IPG	Labour
Popular vote	14,565	10,600
Percentage	57.9%	42.1%
MP before election
Palmer
Ind. Parliamentary Group
Subsequent MP
Townshend
Ind. Parliamentary Group

The Wrekin by-election of November 1920 was held on 20 November 1920. The by-election was held due to the death of the incumbent Independent Parliamentary Group MP, Charles Palmer. It was won by the Independent Parliamentary Group candidate, 59-year old retired Major-General Sir Charles Townshend, who was against the current Unionist-Liberal coalition government and beat Charles Duncan, 55-year old Labour candidate and former MP.

The Wrekin by-election, 1920 (November)
Party	Candidate	Votes	%	±%
Ind. Parliamentary Group	Charles Townshend	14,565	57.9	+17.2
Labour	Charles Duncan	10,600	42.1	+3.7
Majority		3,965	15.8	+13.5
Turnout		25,165	78.3	+7.3
Ind. Parliamentary Group hold		Swing		
