= Charles Townshend (British Army officer) =

First World War soldier (1861–1924)

Major-General Sir Charles Townshend KCB DSO
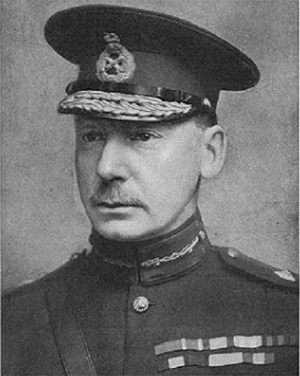
- Born: 21 February 1861; London, United Kingdom
- Died: 18 May 1924 (aged 63); Paris, France
- Relatives: George Townshend, 1st Marquess Townshend
- Military career
- Allegiance: United Kingdom
- Branch: Royal Marines (1881–1886); British Army (1886–1920)
- Service years: 1881–1920
- Rank: Major-General
- Commands: 6th (Poona) Division; 4th Rawalpindi Brigade; 9th Jhansi Brigade; 54th East Anglian Division; 44th Home Counties Division; Orange River Colony District; 12th Sudanese Battalion
- Conflicts: Mahdist War; Hunza–Nagar Campaign; Chitral Expedition; North-West Frontier; First World War
- Awards: Knight Commander of the Order of the Bath; Distinguished Service Order

Member of Parliament for The Wrekin
- In office 20 November 1920 – 26 October 1922
- Preceded by: Charles Palmer
- Succeeded by: Howard Button

Personal details
- Party: Independent Parliamentary Group

Major-General Sir Charles Vere Ferrers Townshend, KCB, DSO (21 February 1861 – 18 May 1924) was a British marine and later soldier who led an overreaching military campaign in Mesopotamia during World War I. His troops were besieged and captured at the Siege of Kut (December 1915 – April 1916), which historian Christopher Catherwood called "the worst defeat of the Allies in World War I".

Controversially and in contrast to the miserable captivity endured by his men, Townshend was held on Prinkipo, where he was treated like an esteemed guest until his release in October 1918. He was briefly a Conservative Member of Parliament from 1920 to 1922.

== Early life ==
Townshend grew up poor in an otherwise prominent family, the son of a railroad clerk, Charles Thornton Townshend (1840–1889), and Louise Graham, a Melbourne native who brought no dowry. He was the great-great-grandson of Field Marshal George Townshend, 1st Marquess Townshend. His paternal grandfather, Rev. George Osborne Townshend (1801–1876), was the son of politician Lord John Townshend, the second son of the first marquess.

He was very ambitious and nourished high hopes of inheriting the family title and the family estate at Raynham Hall in Norfolk, as his cousin Viscount Raynham, the heir to the title, had no children until later in life. He was educated at Cranleigh School and the Royal Military College, Sandhurst. On graduation from Sandhurst, he was granted a commission with the Royal Marine Light Infantry in 1881.

Townshend was a well-known "playboy" officer in his youth, famous for his womanising, drinking, for playing the banjo while singing very bawdy songs and for spending an excessive amount of his time in the music halls. He was often described by those who knew him as a "ladies' man" who was very popular with the opposite sex owing to his dashing personality and good looks. He was also known for his theatrical style, and he liked to associate with actors.

In 1884, Townshend was part of the relief expedition to rescue the besieged army of General Charles Gordon, better known to the British public as "Chinese Gordon", at Khartoum. As a Royal Marine officer, he strictly speaking should not had been part of an Army expedition, but he wrote to Field Marshal Garnet Wolsely asking if he could go, and his request was granted. The way that Gordon had defied the orders of the government to leave Khartoum, knowing full well that the government could not abandon a national hero like himself and would have to send out a relief expedition to save him made a great impression on Townshend. Even through Gordon had flagrantly and repeatedly ignored orders to evacuate Khartoum, the British press had generally portrayed "Chinese Gordon" as a Christian hero and martyr who had died heroically resisting the Islamic army of the Mahdi, and attacked the government of William Gladstone as abject cowards whose efforts to save Gordon were too little, too late. The power of the press and its ability to rouse public opinion in favour of heroic generals besieged by Islamic fanatics was noted by Townshend at the time. In January 1885, he fought at the Battle of Abu Klea, which was his first battle and the first time he killed a man. In 1886, he transferred from the Royal Marines to the British Army, largely because he felt it offered better prospects of promotion. The American historian John Semple Galbraith wrote that "Townshend was an inveterate self-advertiser, constantly and actively promoting his own brilliance in the hope of recognition by a grateful country, preferably in the form of a KCB."

A passionate Francophile who spoke fluent French, Townshend preferred to be addressed as "Alphonse" – something which often annoyed his colleagues, who regarded his "Frenchified" manners as extremely snobbish and off-putting. An intensely ambitious man, he was constantly writing letters to friends, relatives and anyone who might be able to help him achieve a promotion, saying that he desperately needed a promotion and asking them to "pull some strings" to help him. Townshend's biographer, the British historian A.J. Barker noted, "Anybody who could further his career was invariably called up to help, often in the most pleading of terms". Sean McKnight, the Deputy Head of War Studies at Sandhurst, called him "just about the most dramatically ambitious senior officer I think I've ever come across. He's never content, he's always looking for the second or third job down the line, and one of the most irritating facets of him is, even when he's got something he should be very happy with, he's not content". Townshend's endlessly ambitious streak, together with his tendency to view whatever position he held as insufficient for him, and a penchant for writing letters attacking whoever was his commanding officer as incompetent to their commanding officer, made him very unpopular with his other officers, who viewed him variously as a treacherous intriguer forever scheming for a promotion, a pathetic whiner who was never happy with what he had, and a dangerous megalomaniac whose vainglorious quest for yet another promotion led him to take gratuitous risks. The British historian Geoffrey Regan described him as an officer whose high intelligence and abilities were marred by his egomania.

== Imperial soldier ==
He served in the Sudan Expedition of 1884, then on 12 December 1885 he was appointed on probation to the Indian Staff Corps and was permanently appointed on 15 January 1886. He went on to serve on the Hunza Naga expedition in 1891. Townshend was involved in the storming of the Nilt fort held by the Hunza tribesmen, writing in his diary on 20 December 1891:

I write this at Thol. It has been a real day of success. Thirty shots from each corps paraded on the ridge this morning and we fired on the sangars so accurately that they could hardly get a shot back.

On 4 May 1893, Townshend left to take command of a fort at Gupis, writing to a girlfriend in London:

This is a most awful place. You never saw such a desert. Just see if you can find it on the map. It is north of Gilgit. However, I know you will never find it, and it don’t much matter, but here I am stuck down with a few troops".

In 1894, while commanding the newly built fort at Gupis, he entertained the visiting George Curzon, "through a long evening with French songs to the accompaniment of a banjo." At Fort Gupis, the Francophile Townshend decorated the interior walls of the fort with illustrations advertising the latest plays popular in Paris. In January 1895, he was sent to north of Chitral, a remote town in the extreme north of India almost on the borders with the Russian Empire in what is now Pakistan in an area known as "the Roof of the World" owing to its extreme height.

Townshend made his name in England as a British Imperial hero with the assistance of London's Fleet Street's coverage of his conduct as the besieged garrison commander during the Siege of Chitral Fort on the North West Frontier in 1895, for which he was made Companion of the Order of the Bath (CB). The North-West Frontier of India comprised what is now the "badlands" that make up the border between today's Pakistan and Afghanistan, a remote, backward area inhibited by Muslim Pashtun hill tribes that were in a state of more or less permanent low-level warfare with the tribes on the British side of the frontier, constantly revolting against the authority of the Raj under the banner of jihad, while raiders from Afghanistan were crossing over to wage jihad against the British infidels. The British Crown Colony of India comprised all of what have since become India, Pakistan and Bangladesh. The British never fully controlled the North-West Frontier, and from 2 March – 20 April 1895 an Indian force under the command of Captain Townshend sent to maintain a friendly ruler in remote Chitral was besieged instead by the local tribesmen. After being defeated by the tribesmen following an attempt to storm the village, despite being outnumbered, Townshend ordered a retreat into the fort, writing:

We had a long way to go; and from all the hamlets as we approached Chitral we were fired into from orchards and houses right and left, front and rear! It was now very dark. I saw there was nothing for it but to double or else none of us would reach the fort alive, and this we did.

During the siege, he decorated his room with the latest Art Nouveau posters from Paris promoting the current plays. On 24 March 1895, Townshend wrote in his diary: "Incessant rain. There is nothing for the horses to eat, so we eat the horses." After a siege of forty-six days by Muslim Hunza tribesmen, the fortress was relieved by Captain Fenton Aylmer, and Townshend returned to Britain a national hero. The fact that he and his four hundred Indian troops were vastly outnumbered by the Hunza tribesmen during the siege further added to his heroic lustre.

Upon his return to London, Townshend had dinner with Queen Victoria at Buckingham Palace, who publicly thanked him as a hero of the recent campaign, an experience that helped to increase the size of his already ample ego. Afterwards, he was personally made a member of the Most Honourable Order of the Bath by Queen Victoria, which was a rare honor for a captain in the Indian Army. His fame allowed him to develop friendships with the two social groups whose approval he most craved-the aristocracy and actors, especially the stars of the West End theatre scene. He visited the family that rented Balls Park from the Townshend family, leading him to write in his diary:

The Phillips were very kind to me, and I spent all Sunday going about the house and grounds. It is most awfully sad to think of it all. A splendid old family like ours, and Lord Townshend cannot now afford to live at Raynham Hall in Norfolk, which is let to Sir Edmund Lacon, or at Balls Park, let to Mr Phillips; and from what I heard from Lord St. Levan the other day, Balls Park will have to be sold and most of the land at Raynham as well. To think of it all, and the last century there was no family more powerful than ours. …I wonder if ever I shall be the means of restoring some of the old prestige to the family.

A keen amateur military historian who took the study of military history very seriously, Townshend had developed a set of ideas about the "principle of economy of force", the "principle of mass" and the "adoption of the Napoleonic principles by Moltke", which he believed would guarantee victory to any general who followed them. A military intellectual and a Francophile, he was one of the few British officers who before 1914 had studied the writings of Ferdinand Foch, regarded at the time as France's premier military intellectual and via Foch, he discovered the writings of General Carl von Clausewitz. The British historian Hew Strachan described him thusly:

Townshend was a cultured man. He married a French wife, he was very fond of all things French, and he saw that as part of his character. And in many ways therefore not a typical Army officer of the day, another reason for his being seen to be slightly out of the mainstream professionally. In fact, he was wasn't a comfortable man from the point of view of others in the Mess.

Many officers found Francophile "Alphonse" Townshend a difficult man to deal with, but Townshend was very popular with the soldiers he commanded, both British and Indian. He made himself popular with his men by playing and singing obscene, sexually explicit French songs in both French and English on his banjo.

He was attached to the British Egyptian army and, as commanding officer of the 12th Sudanese Battalion, he fought in the Sudan at the Battle of Atbara and the Battle of Omdurman in 1898, for which he was awarded the Distinguished Service Order. In January 1896, he received a letter from Herbert Kitchener, who wrote that he wanted him to serve under his command in Egypt, which served as a measure of Townshend's fame that a general would ask a mere captain not even under his command to take charge of one of his battalions. During battles with the Islamic fundamentalist Ansar of the Sudan from 1896 to 1899, culminating in Omdurman, he was promoted by Kitchener to major and was mentioned in dispatches for outstanding bravery for the fourth and fifth time. Commanding the 12th Sudanese Battalion revealed the paradoxical attitudes held by him to non-white peoples, contrasting his care for his men and great pride in their achievements yet assuming the automatic superiority of the British over anyone not white, and he did not hesitate to blame failures of his men on their skin color. On 7 March 1896, he described the men of the 12th Sudanese Battalion as: "I am very pleased with the physique of the men. They are fine strapping blacks, mostly tall. I felt quite small inspecting them. … I felt I had a stroke of luck in getting command of this regiment." On 5 June 1896, he first encountered the Ansar, whom the British incorrectly called the "Dervishes" at the Battle of Ferkeh. Kitchener defeated the Ansar and Townshend wrote about the battle in his diary:

Suddenly Burn-Murdoch sent his galloper to me to say that numbers of Dervishes were about to break out on our right, where the guns had gone, and ordered me to proceed there and head them back. I took two companies with me at the double… When we topped the rise I deployed on the move, moving on in line, and could then see the Dervishes in white groups coming out of a nullah in the rocks in front, but evidently wavering. I poured a hot fire into them, and they fled right and left. The show was over...The Sirdar [Kitchener] rode up about 9 a.m. He was very pleased and chatted for some time. … Our casualties amounted to 100 killed and wounded, and the Dervishes to about 1,200. Making a rough calculation, there were about 2,500 Dervishes in Firkhet, and we were at least 9,000 men with good guns and ammunition and Maxims.

Besides battling the Ansar, Townshend spent his time perfecting his French, reading books of military history and French novels, learning Arabic and training his Sudanese soldiers when not entertaining them with his banjo.

The years from 1896 to 1898 were some of the a busy time for Townshend, as he spent half of his time fighting the Ansar in the Sudan and the other half romancing the French aristocrat Alice Cahan d'Anvers whom he first met in Luxor when visiting Egyptian ruins on 19 February 1897, and whom he followed back to Cairo. On 22 June 1897, Townshend wrote in his diary in his post in the Sudan:

The letter of the Comtesse D’Anvers is the sweetest I have ever had in my life. She writes as a mother to me. Never have I been touched like this. She and her daughter Alice are the best friends I have, and I look forward only to the time when I can get home and see them again.

On 10 September 1897, Townshend wrote in his diary:

This evening I gave an entertainment for the Battalion. This is a big sort of show called by the Sudanese a “Darluka.” Much “boosa” or Sudanese beer is given out, and everyone turned up at the 12th Sudanese quarters at 6.30. Colonel Lewis and I paid them a visit after mess. All the tribes danced to the music of tom-toms and the accompaniment of singing in perfect time....In the end they all got very drunk [men and women] and abandoned themselves to fiercer orgies. I was discreet and left the scene early. … Poor devils, why should they not amuse themselves in their own fashion? and, after all, as Sir Richard Burton said, morality is largely a question of geography.

Thoughts of Cahen D'Anvers only took up part of his time as Townshend often found engaged in fierce fighting with the Ansar as he wrote about the Battle of Atbara on 8 April 1898 that:

Alternately firing and rushing forward, I rapidly approached the Dervish position. The men were dropping fairly fast. … I led each rush myself, sounding the “cease fire” on my whistle, which the men obeyed very well. Then I dashed through the ranks, leading the Battalion about thirty yards ahead, the men following excellently. … A lot of men were firing as I called on the 12th to charge, waving them on. They broke into a rush with cheers we swept into the zareeba. How I wasn’t hit I don’t know.

Kitchener was determined to have a railroad rather the boats on the Nile supply his army as he advanced into the Sudan, and assigned its construction to a Canadian railroad builder, Sir Percy Girouard. As Girouard built the railroad from Cairo to supply Kitchener's army as it advanced on Khartoum, Townshend often had time for leave. On 8 May 1898 during a visit to Paris, Townshend wrote about his latest encounter with Cahen D'Anvers:

At last we were together. I had long loved Alice Cahen D’Anvers and she loves me. Before luncheon, while we stood looking at the log fire in the library, I told her that whether I left the Sudan directly after Khartoum depended on her. If she would marry me I would leave it directly after we had taken Khartoum. Then she said: “If it depends on me you will not stay in the Sudan very long.” I drew her to me and kissed her, putting my arms around her dear neck. It was worth waiting for, and all I had suffered last year, to be rewarded like this.

Shortly afterwards, he returned to the Sudan to resume his battles with the Ansar. Regarding Kitchener, he wrote:

I have the greatest admiration of the Sirdar as an organiser, the first of his day, at any rate as regards Egypt. He has repainted the map from Halfa to Khartoum, and has thrown open wide the gate to the mysteries of Central Africa and the Lakes. … With all this, I do not think he is the man to lead an army in the field; he is not a leader of men, like Sir Redvers Buller, for instance.

At the Battle of Omdurman, Townshend wrote:

The masses of the enemy began rushing and cheering, the Emirs leading them with flags just as one sees with the Pathans on the North-West Frontier of India. I now began to think that it would not do to wait until this mass got much closer, so I sang out for sights to be put at 600 yards, and then opened with heavy independent fire, and in a short while our line was all smoke and a ceaseless rattle of Martini rifles. The enemy came on till they reached 400 yards, and they seemed to enter a rain of bullets. Struck by a leaden tempest, they bundled over in heaps, and soon they stood huddled over in groups under the retaining power of the Martini Henry. I saw a brave man leading them with a large flag (I have his flag), I have never seen a braver. Alone he came on and on, until about 150 yards from us, and then he and his flag fell like a piece of crumpled white paper on the ground, and lay motionless.

After the annihilating defeat of the Ansar, as Townshend looked over the battlefield full of thousands and thousands of dead Ansar, he wrote in his diary, "I think Gordon has been avenged now". Townshend's "playboy" life-style finally came to an end when he married at the age of thirty-seven, which was late by the standards of the time. After Omdurman, he went to France and on 22 November 1898 married Alice Cahen D'Anvers in a Church of England ceremony at Chậteau de Champs, despite the fact she was Jewish. Cahen d'Anvers was the daughter of the French aristocrats ennobled under Napoleon III, the Comte Louis Cahen d'Anvers and the Comtesse Cahen d'Anvers, who owned a beautiful estate, the Château de Champs, which was located in the French countryside close to Paris, where Townshend often stayed. Townshend regarded the Château de Champs as the best substitute for Raynham Hall, which he hoped to inherit one day provided that he won enough military glory for the marquess to leave him Raynham Hall in his will. When his duty was not him taking all over the Empire, he preferred to live at the Château de Champs, a place he deeply loved. The Townshends had only one child, a daughter named Audrey.

At this time, Townshend began to overplay his hand and alienated his superiors. When Winston Churchill-who had gotten to know him well in the Sudan-asked him to read over an early draft of his 1899 book The River War, Townshend in his notes attacked allies such as Sir Herbert Kitchener, Sir Archibald Hunter and Hector MacDonald, aka "Fighting Mac", as all having "got a reputation – perhaps greater than they can uphold." After Omdurman, Townshend resigned from the Egyptian Army to take up a staff position in the Punjab, but then refused the job, as he wanted a command in South Africa, writing to both Redvers Buller and Sir Evelyn Wood, asking to be sent to South Africa, where relations with the Transvaal were declining and war was thought likely. After learning that neither Buller and Wood were able or willing to do so, Townshend arrived in India to take the staff command in the Punjab, only to learn the position had already been filled, as he had refused it. He then went to meet the Viceroy Lord Curzon, who then gave him the staff job after all. Shortly afterwards, the 5th Marquis died and Townshend asked for leave to go to England to settle the Townshend family affairs, which greatly annoyed Curzon as this prolonged absence left the staff job in the Punjab empty again.

The Second Boer War began in October 1899, and Townshend left England to go to South Africa, which was a violation of the rules, as he held a commission the Indian Army at the time and should have returned to India. Even through he was not supposed to be in South Africa at all, he was able to secure himself a command in the war. Townshend left Southampton on board the SS Armenian in early February 1900, and it was announced a couple of days later that he had been "selected for employment on special service in South Africa". He was appointed Assistant Adjutant General on the staff of the Military Governor for the Orange Free State in 1900 and then transferred to the Royal Fusiliers later that year.

After lobbying the War Office for a promotion and a command in the British Army, he was given a staff job in the Bedfordshire Regiment, which led to him to write that the Bedfordshire regiment was not prestigious enough for him, and what he wanted was a position in the Irish Guards. After much lobbying on his part, the War Office gave him a posting with the Royal Fusiliers instead.

His time with the Royal Fusiliers was not a happy one as Townshend constantly fought with his commanding officer, and he wrote a long series of letters to the War Office asking them for a promotion and a transfer to a more prestigious regiment, who replied that he had already received enough. Reflecting his unhappiness with the Royal Fusiliers, Townshend received leave to make a lengthy visit to Canada in 1902.

He was supposed to be researching possible invasion routes by which the United States might invade Canada, which led him to travel the length and breath of Canada, but most of his time was spent in the province of Quebec researching the role of his famous ancestor, George Townshend, 1st Marquess Townshend, in fighting the French in the Seven Years' War for a biography he was writing.

In 1903, Townshend was sent to Burma. After arriving in Rangoon on 6 April 1903, Townshend wrote:

We were at anchor in the stream at Rangoon at 9 a.m., and after two hours of monkey tricks and chinoiserie about plague inspections by the port doctor, the steamer was allowed to go in alongside the quay. … Alice of course dragged me out to see the great Pagoda of Shive Dagon and other pagodas; and the Burmese, Chinese, Indian and Portuguese bazaars and quarters of the city. I like the look of the Burmans, pretty well-built girls, many of them decidedly handsome and beautifully made, with glossy black hair.

In 1904, Townshend returned to India, where he annoyed Kitchener by repeated requests that he be given command of a regiment. Promoted to brevet colonel in February 1904, he became military attaché in Paris in 1905 and then transferred as a major to the King's Shropshire Light Infantry (KSLI) in March 1906. He went on to be an assistant adjutant general (AAG) for the 9th Division in India in August 1907 and, promoted to colonel in August that year, commander of the Orange River Colony District in South Africa in 1908.

On 4 May 1911 during a visit to Paris, Townshend, who on 19 June was promoted to major general, met Ferdinand Foch, who was quite critical of British policy towards Europe, warning that Germany was out to dominate the world and was Britain prepared to take a stand or not? Townshend wrote in his diary:

General Foch asked me if I knew how many army corps the Germans will put into line....Did England contemplate the annexation of Belgium and the sea-board with equanimity? It was a case where England, France and Belgium must fight together for existence. He said, “we do not want to conquer: we want to live and it is time everyone understood this”.

In April 1912 he was placed in command of the Home Counties Division, later the 44th (Home Counties) Division, a Territorial Force (TF) formation, taking over from Major General Edward Thompson Dickson.

Townshend's habit of ceaselessly lobbying his superiors for a promotion and his frequent transfers from various units as he sought to climb the career ladder tried the patience of many, and ironically actually hindered his career, as he earned the reputation of being something of a whiner and someone who never stayed in a regiment for very long. In 1914, he asked to be given a command on the Western Front and was refused.

After the First World War began, the Germans tried very hard to stir up a revolt in India. In November 1914, the Ottoman Empire entered the war, and the Sultan-Caliph issued a declaration of jihad urging upon Muslims everywhere to fight against Britain, France and Russia. In this context, the Raj was greatly concerned about the prospect of a mutiny by the Indian soldiers and the tribes on the North-west Frontier might all rise up. Townshend as a man who had proven he could command Indians successfully and as someone who knew the North-West Frontier well was being kept in India in case of trouble, much to his own fury as he desperately wanted to go join the British Expeditionary Force.

== First World War ==
In the Spring of 1915, Townsend was promoted to the rank of Major-General and appointed to the command of the 6th (Poona) Division in Mesopotamia, tasked with protecting British Empire's oil production assets in Persia from Ottoman Imperial attack. He arrived in Basra from India in April to assume command of the Division. As he sailed up the Tigris in a steamer named the Dwarka, Townshend often wrote in his diary about Belisarius, "the Roman general who gave a last flicker of glory to the expiring Eastern Empire" by conquering Mesopotamia from the Persians in 541, going on to write: "Who knows that I shall not eventually become governor of Mesopotamia?".

=== Mesopotamian Campaign 1915–1916 ===
General Townshend was ordered by his commanding officer, General John Nixon, to advance the 6th (Poona) Division from Basra along the north-westerly course of the River Tigris in a large river flotilla consisting of a variety of vessels, with the strategic objective of capturing the town of Amarah and destroying in the process all Ottoman Imperial military forces present in its path in Lower Mesopotamia. Townshend's relations with Nixon were not good, and within four days of first meeting him, Townshend was writing letters to Nixon's superiors in India attacking him as incompetent and suggesting that he was a better man to lead Force D. In his 1920 book My Campaign in Mesopotamia, Townshend wrote about Nixon's plans:

I was always of the opinion that as Mesopotamia was a secondary Theatre of War. We should have held Basra and its provinces on the defensive by a disposition similar to the Manoeuvre of a Central Position...I should have occupied the towns of Kurna [Al-Qurna] on the Tigris, in the bifurcation of the Tigris and the Euphrates, Nasiriyeh [An Nasiriya], and Ahwaz [Ahvāz] on the Karun River...with minimum forces strongly entrenched and with ammunition and provisions for six months...in this way I should have secured Mesopotamia at a minimum cost to England and in absolute security until such time as the Government decided I should take the offensive-preferably when the decisive offensive was assumed in the theatre in France-and gave me adequate forces to do so.

At the time, Townshend was all for an advance up the Tigris, through he believed that taking Baghdad was strategically pointless. The purpose of the British Force D was to protect the oil wells of southern-western Persia (later Iran) which supplied Britain with almost all of its oil from being attacked by the Ottomans. By occupying in late 1914 the Ottoman vilayet (province) of Basra (now southern Iraq), the British had achieved their strategic purpose of preventing the Ottomans from launching any offensive into the Khuzestan Province of Persia where all of the British-owned oil fields of Persia were located. There was no real strategic need for the British to advance up the Tigris to take Baghdad, but both Nixon and Townshend were all for it for reasons of prestige. Townshend, who was hungry for glory as usual, resented being sent to a backwater like Mesopotamia instead of France, where the decisive fighting was taking place, and was determined to make the most of his posting by taking Baghdad, which he hoped would lead him to being given what he really wanted, namely the command of a corps on the Western Front. Regan wrote that the "Baghdad" that Townshend spoke of was a "mythical" place that had nothing to do with the real city. From 762 to 1258, Baghdad had been the capital of Abbasid Caliphate, during which time it became known in both the Middle East and Europe as a city of fabulous wealth and high culture. In 1258, Baghdad had been sacked and razed to the ground by the Mongols under Hulagu Khan, and the new city that had been built on the ruins was a pale shadow of the old Baghdad. The old Baghdad lived on in folk memories as an enchanted place that sadly was no more but that grew more and more beautiful as time went on. Subsequently, the popularity of books like One Thousand and One Nights and other "Orientalist" literature in the West inspired by The Arabian Nights had built on folk memories of Abbasid Baghdad to depict it in lushly romantic terms; a fantastically exotic, mysterious, beautiful and sensuous city of tremendous wealth and languid eroticism. The Baghdad of Townshend's time was actually a run-down, impoverished provincial city in the Ottoman Empire.

What made Townshend's advance possible was the anomalous administration arrangements that he operated under. India was a British Crown Colony with its own army. The Indian Army and all of the British troops in India, was responsible to the Viceroy of India, not the War Office in London, which in practice meant that it had a considerable degree of autonomy from London. Though London had the ultimate say in the deployment of the Army of India, the Viceroy Lord Hardinge fought hard to preserve his control of his forces, and the War Office had to negotiate with him when it came to the deployment of his forces as if they were dealing with an allied nation instead of a Crown Colony. Most of the revenue used to fund the Army of India came from selling opium to China, and the end of opium sales to China in 1910 had cost the Indian government about £4 million (about £50 million in 1984 values) without any replacement. For Lord Hardinge, having to operate on reduced means and whose mandate dictated that securing the North-West Frontier was his primary responsibility, the demand to send troops to Europe was unwelcome, and he fought hard to keep the Army of India in India. Failing that, Hardinge wanted the Persian Gulf to be the exclusive responsibility for the Raj, since this was considered a quiet theatre that would not drain away too many troops and by having the Raj protect Britain's oil supplies, allowing him to say that India was making a major contribution to the war effort. The India Office in London wanted the operations in Persian Gulf to be managed by the Raj as a way of showing off how well-run India was under their watch. Most of the oil Britain used came from a series of oil fields around the city of Abadan in Persia-which happened to be very close to the border with the Ottoman Empire-and as most of the British Army was engaged in Europe, the War Office asked Lord Hardinge to provide the troops to take Basra and thus prevent the Ottomans from violating Persian neutrality to seize Abadan. In exchange for giving up control of the Indian divisions sent in the fall of 1914 to join the British Expeditionary Force on the Western Front, Hardinge had the entire Persian Gulf region made the exclusive responsibility of the Army of India. As a consequence, Force D with its headquarters in Basra that was operating in Mesopotamia took its orders from the Indian Army's headquarters in Shimla, while the Egyptian Expeditionary Force (EEF) with its headquarters in Cairo that was operating in the Sinai took its orders from the CIGS in London. Despite the fact that both Force D and the Egyptian Expeditionary Force were engaged against the Ottoman Empire, co-operation between the two forces was very poor, with for example, two intelligence services operating in the Near East that refused to share information with one another under the grounds that the other service was a "rival". The intelligence service based in Cairo had a number of Arabic and Turkish speakers attached to it, while there were few intelligence officers in the Indian Army who were fluent in Arabic or Turkish, which meant the EEF had better intelligence. The lack of good intelligence was to be a recurring problem for Townshend, who consistently received intelligence that underestimated both the quantity and quality of the Ottoman forces against him. As all of the troops in Mesopotamia were responsible to Lord Hardinge, who was not much interested in what his officers were doing in the Middle East-saying that ruling the Empire of India was enough work-and was inclined to give them a free rein to do whatever they wanted. Likewise, Beauchamp Duff, the commander of the Army of India, lived in Shimla, which was a long way from Basra and simply had no interest in Mesopotamia, being known as the "hermit clerk", owing to his reclusive nature and his obsession with paperwork at the expense of everything else. Because the War Office in London had no operational control over the forces in Mesopotamia until 1916 and Lord Hardinge and Duff lacked the willingness to assert their authority, officers on the ground had much freedom to conduct their policies. The War Secretary, Field Marshal Sir Herbert Kitchener, was opposed to the idea of an advance to take Baghdad, arguing that it would drain away resources needed for the Western Front to take a target of no real military value for prestige, but the Persian Gulf was Lord Hardinge's area of responsibility, and Kitchener could not convince the cabinet to stop the operation. The Prime Minister H. H. Asquith was overwhelmed with the responsibilities of leading his nation during a world war, and under his leadership cabinet meetings tended to drag on and on, as he sought a consensus between opposing factions instead of deciding for one course or another. The Asquith cabinet reached a compromise: allow Force D to advance on Baghdad, but give first priority to supplying the Western Front.

Force D, to which Townshend's 6th Division was attached, was a mostly Indian force that had a major shortage of artillery with no heavy guns and was deficient in supplies of transport for clean drinking water, wire-cutters, telephones, lights, tents, signal rockets, mosquito nets, telescopic sights, flares, helmets, hand grenades, periscopes and blankets. Most seriously of all, Force D lacked proper medical supplies, lacking hospital ships or nurses assigned to it, drugs, dressings, and splints to treat wounds. Finally there was a shortage of doctors, with no ice or electric fans provided for the treatment of wounded men. All of these deficiencies, especially the medical shortages, were to cost Force D dearly in the coming months; Townshend was well aware of these problems, but did not see fit to raise the subject with Nixon during his meetings with him. Of the troops under his command, Townshend had a high opinion of the Dorset Regiment and the Oxford and Buckinghamshire Light Infantry and above all of the Sikh Twenty-second Punjabi Regiment, which he believed to be superior to any of the Ottoman forces operating in Mesopotamia. The traditional animosity between Sikhs and Muslims going back to the 17th century meant that many of the Sikh soldiers were very much looking forward to a chance to kill Muslims, so morale in the Twenty-second Punjabi Regiment was high.

Townshend first viewed the Ottoman lines by walking up an observation tower, which he called "a rickety structure of wooden scaffolding, like a lighthouse on the sands". He described how flooding by the Tigris river was "giving the landscape the air of Lake Superior or Michigan in the United States. Sand-hill islands appeared in the waters. They were Turkish redoubts. In fact, I had reason to think that Wolfe's job at Quebec was a fool to mine". Townshend wrote that he wanted use the "Principle of the Principle Mass in a turning movement against the redoubts from the westward", but all of the ground had been flooded. He rejected the idea of a frontal attack as "the most unsatisfactory and costly manner of attack". Townshend wrote:

I saw I was committed to a peculiarly difficult operation with an unknown command under me. It seemed to me that the betting was well in favour of the Turks; and I am quite certain that, if I had been in the position of the Turkish general, I should have had inflicted a bloody defeat on the British.

He complained that he lacked sapper and signal companies and that the "three trans-Border Pathan companies" recruited from the North-West Frontier of India (the "badlands" that today are the border between Pakistan and Afghanistan) were of very questionable loyalty, as the Ottomans had proclaimed a jihad against the British, and the men in the three companies were all Muslim. Townshend wrote:

All of the mistakes and errors of our maritime expeditions during the 18th and early part of the 19th centuries are here repeated with interest. Even Bonaparte cold not have succeeded with methods like this...Truly a heart-breaking affair for one imbued with the importance of the Principle of Force!

Despite his constant complaining, Townshend never suggested that the advance up the Tigris be cancelled and Force D remain on the defensive. He conceived the idea of the "Regatta up the Tigris" by using some 328 local boats known as bellums to stealthily advance his men across the marshes at night to outflank the Ottoman positions. Townshend described using the bellums as "practically the same way as punting on the Thames". He wrote that: "The leading feature...was that the infantry must advance in boats, and the only boats available at Basra were the Arab bellums or 'balams' on each of which a crew one NCO and 9 men could be placed". He commanded his force from HMS Espiegle, a Doterel-class sloop which, together with the sloops Odin and Clio and the armored tugboats Shaitan and Lewis Pelly, formed a floating battery for the fire support of the "Regatta up the Tigris". He recalled that the Espiegle was steered "by the old-fashioned hand wheel between decks", requiring that the officer on the bridge to shout down orders to the helmsman below, leading to the ship often running aground on the Tigris.

==== March to Baghdad ====
The opening phase of the advance went spectacularly well against numerically superior opposition in difficult and hostile terrain and climate, most of the Ottoman forces fleeing or surrendering with comparatively little fighting. Townshend began his advance on 31 May 1915 when he had his 18-pounder artillery guns open fire on the Ottoman trenches while his men in the bellums outflanked the Ottoman positions. He called his advance on Amarah "Regatta Week" as his fleet began what he called a "vigorous and rapid pursuit by the naval flotilla on Amarah". He had a very low opinion of the Marsh Arabs whom he regarded as "great scoundrels and even murderers" good only for looting, and he dismissively referred them as the "Salvation Army". In the Ottoman Empire, the state religion was Sunni Islam and the Marsh Arabs, being Shia Muslims, were oppressed by the Ottoman state; Townshend could have won the Marsh Arabs over to the Allied cause had he been willing to take the time to cultivate them. A moment in the campaign that captured much attention occurred when Townshend sailed into Bahran on the Espiegle at about 2:00 am with the blue dome of Ezra's Tomb simmering in the light of a full moon in the distance to promptly capture the town without a shot being fired, a dramatic action in suitably exotic settling that in the minds of the public sealed his heroic aura. To move faster, he transferred his headquarters to the armed steamer Comet, which he personally led into the town of Kila Salih, where its one twelve-pounder gun cut down the Ottoman cavalrymen guarding the town. Townshend wrote that: "Kila Salih seemed a town as large as Kurna. There was a great display of white flags on all the houses...". He met with a local sheik to tell him that 15,000 Anglo-Indian troops were advancing on Amarah, a bit of misinformation which as he guessed it would be, was promptly reported to the Ottoman commanders at Amarah. Amarah was taken on 3 June 1915, largely by bluff, with two thousand Ottoman soldiers captured as prisoners of war. After taking Amarah, Townshend issued a press release-which completely ignored the role of his Indian soldiers-by claiming that a mere twenty-five British soldiers and sailors commanded by himself had taken Amarah. At Amarah, he took as one of the prizes of war a gigantic Persian carpet, which he had shipped back to England. He was popular with his men. McKnight of Sandhurst stated in an interview:

Occasionally his quirky sense of humor plays quite well with the men. There was an occasion early on in the siege where he does a snap inspection twenty-four hours earlier than was expected and discovers the officer in command of the particular redoubt desperately trying to change into something a little bit more formal with no clothes on. Townshend insists the guy accompanies him on the inspection then and there with no clothes on, which obviously the officer hated, but would have been loved by the men in the trenches!

An extremely aggressive commander whose natural inclinations were for the offensive, Townshend was all for taking Baghdad, and his successes encouraged him. In a letter to his wife, he described his advance:

...such a rapid, hard-hitting pursuit after a victory has hardly a parallel. Eighty miles without stopping, and I was so excited and never going to sleep and so determined to destroy the Turks that I ate nothing! My constant watchword was 'Smite hip and thigh-the sword of the Lord and Gideon!'

Driven by his desire for promotion and a willingness to take risks, Townshend utilized aggressive cavalry tactics to successfully advance his forces up the Tigris River.

After taking Amarah, he, like his many of his men, fell ill after drinking dirty water, and suffering from severe diarrhea and vomiting, he left his command for a modern hospital in Bombay to recover. The ordinary soldiers who fell ill were not so privileged and had to manage as best they could with a ramshackle medical system. The American journalist James Perry wrote despite the overwhelming need for hospital ships to provide better medical care that, "The idiotic Nixon still hadn't provided hospital ships or ambulances or nurses or ice and electric fans". Townshend wrote bitterly that Kurna was the supposed location of the Garden of Eden, while Amarah was said to have been the Garden of Tears where Adam and Eve had been banished from the Garden of Eden, saying that the latter description was quite correct, as Amarah was a "thief-ridden incubator of dysentery, sunstroke, malaria and paratyphoid". The intense heat-the average daily temperature ranged from 100 to 123 Fahrenheit-imposed immense stain on his men, who were always very thirsty and drank from the river Tigris despite warnings that the beautiful, simmering water was unsafe to drink, causing them to contact dysentery. The ships that took wounded men down the Tigris for the hospitals in Basra appeared to have ropes hanging from the deck, which were actually stalactites of human feces, as the ships lacked proper facilities for treating care of the men and the men were so closely packed together that they were unable to defecate clear of the deck.

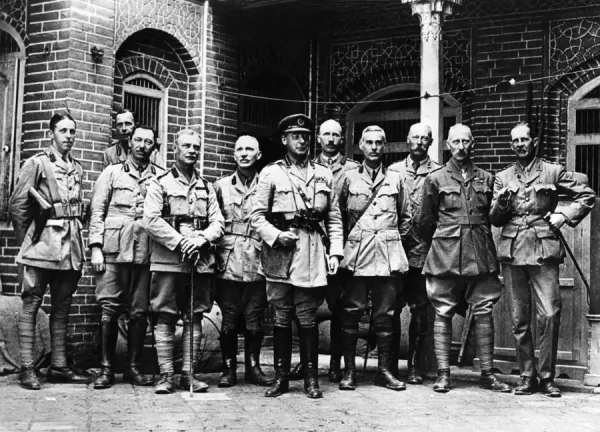
Major General Townshend, GOC 6th Indian Division, and members of his divisional staff in Mesopotamia, 1915/1916.

It was not later in the summer of 1915 that Townshend returned to his command. He reported that if he could defeat the Ottomans at Kurna, he take Baghdad at once, which led Nixon to reply that he was looking forward to riding into Baghdad in triumph on a white horse. On 23 August 1915, Townshend reported to London that if he defeated the Ottomans "and stampeded them, as at Kurna, he was willing to take the responsibility of entering Baghdad". He noted that it was about 500 miles from where he was to Baghdad and that was "undermanned as regards land and water transport", lacking enough ships and wagons to supply a drive to Baghdad, but reflecting the optimistic mood, wrote "Sir John Nixon told me to send him a wire if I intended a rush into Baghdad, as he might be able to come on in time to enter Baghdad with me." As long as the outcome of the Battle of Gallipoli was in doubt, the Ottomans exerted all of their efforts there and largely ignored Townshend's "Regatta up the Tigris". But by August 1915, it was clear that Gallipoli was a stalemate following the failure of the British to break out after their landings at Suvla Bay, which ended the last British chance of victory at Gallipoli. The deadlock was strategically an Ottoman victory, as it prevented the Allies from taking Constantinople. With the Allies contained at Gallipoli, the Three Pashas who ruled the Ottoman Empire now sent a substantial force of Turkish infantrymen under General Nureddin Pasha to stop Townshend. Before the arrival of Nureddin, Townshend had been facing Ottoman Arab units which were of lesser quality as compared to the ethnically Turkish Ottoman units. The core of the Ottoman Army had always been Turkish peasant conscripts from Anatolia, well known for their toughness and tenacity in combat. As he was soon to learn, the ethnically Turkish units in the Ottoman Army were far tougher opponents than the ethnically Arab ones.

Townshend had learned from aerial reconnaissance that Nureddin Pasha had dug in with about 8,000 Turkish infantrymen from Anatolia and about 3,000 Arabs recruited locally. Townshend's plans called for the Minimum Force (Column B) to attack the strongest Ottoman position, while the Principle Mass (Column A) was to encircle the Ottoman position and attack from the rear. At Kut, he sent his "Principle Mass" at a weak point in the Ottoman lines, only for General Hoghton, who was commanding the "Principle Mass", to get lost in the desert during a night advance. Townshend's diversionary force of the Dorset Regiment and the 117th Mahrattas, which was supposed to distract the Ottoman forces, instead ended taking the entire weight on the Ottoman counter-attack, which at times came close to crushing the Anglo-Indian force. Townshend later wrote that, "The whole point of the Mass on the enemy's weakest point was thus lost and it went near to costing us the battle". Facing disaster, the "luck of the Townshends" then came into play: General Hoghton finally found the Ottoman camp and attacked from the rear, leading to a collapse of the Ottoman forces. The Sikh soldiers of the Twenty-second Punjab went about enthusiastically killing as many Muslims as they could during that attack. The Anglo-Indian forces had taken such heavy losses at Kut that Townshend was unable to order a pursuit of the retreating Ottoman Army. He lost 1,229 killed and wounded, and owing to the poor medical care, most of the wounded were to die in the following days. The smell of the wounded flesh and human excrement, together with the lack of tents for sheltering the wounded (who were left to lie out in the open), attracted vast hordes of flies which mercilessly tormented the wounded, dying soldiers. There was such a shortage of splints to treat smashed limbs that the medical officers had to break apart the wooden cases of Johnny Walker whisky to provide makeshift splints.

After his victory, Townshend issued a bombastic press release which claimed that "The Battle of Kut-al-Amara can be said to have been one of the most important in the history of the British Army in India!". After this, the campaign's objectives were extended to encompass the town of Kut-al-Amara, further up the river, which was captured after a set-piece battle on 28 September 1915. The victorious passage of the campaign received much coverage in the British Empire's press, which was encouraged by a British Government anxious for good war news for the public to counteract the military difficulties it was experiencing in Europe on the Western Front and at Gallipoli. Strachan in a 2000 interview stated:

Townshend in the first three months in Mesopotamia achieves a stunning series of successes. He was expected to break through Turkish defences and capture the town of Amara, but he was not expected to do this with a motley fleet of steamers pursuing the Turks in his own personal steamer and actually taking Amara with something like seventy men holding 1,000 prisoners. It was a spectacular advance, very bold, very imaginative and, of course, in 1915 nowhere else in the First World Was as there any similar spectacular success, so Townshend overnight becomes a British sensation. He's a success story and that something that he can build on to make his career go further.

Townshend was impressed with the news that the German Field Marshal Baron Colmar von der Goltz had been sent to stop him, not the least because Goltz was a very respected military historian whom he regarded as his equal, unlike the Ottoman officers whom he held in contempt. Enver Pasha had sent Goltz primarily not to retake Basra, but rather "to prepare for the independent war against India" as Enver had plans to invade Persia and Afghanistan with the aim of taking India. The ambitious Townshend desperately wanted to be promoted to lieutenant general and have the command of a corps, and he believed that taking Baghdad was the best means of achieving both. The Francophile's hero was Napoléon, and some of his colleagues reported he developed "some of the quirks and mannerisms of the First Consul". By this stage in the campaign, he believed that he could win enough bold "Napoleonic" victories that would ultimately make commander-in-chief of the entire British Army. One officer who knew him commented that he was "excellent company when one could get him off the subject of Napoleon" and that he "discoursed at great length" about the victories of his ancestor, Charles Townshend.

At this point, Townshend suggested halting at Kut-al-Amara to gather strength in men and material before attempting an advance upon the city of Baghdad, but General Nixon was convinced by this time that the Ottoman Army was of a sufficiently inferior quality that there was no need, and dash was what was required rather than a more cautious strategy. Townshend reported, "These troops of mine are tired and their tails are not up, but slightly down". The Dorset regiment was down to only 297 men fit for combat, and he expressed worry about the quality of the Indian replacements being sent to him. He always demanded that Nixon supply him with two divisions to take Baghdad, but never asked that Nixon do something to improve his logistics, which become more and more tenuous as he advanced farther and farther away from Basra. Given his supply problems, his demands for another division or two would have increased his logistical difficulties, requiring landing additional supplies at Basra, which was already a hopelessly clogged bottleneck. Townshend told Nixon that he needed at least another division to take Baghdad and hence a promotion to command the newly created corps, which Nixon refused for reasons of spite rather than because of logistics. It was considered pulling two Indian divisions out of France to send them to assist with taking Baghdad, but it was known that it would take some time to embark the Indians at Marseilles to send them via ships to Basra. Townshend stated that he take, but not hold Baghdad with one division, but the prospect of another two divisions he argued that Baghdad could be held.

The Ottoman caliphate had proclaimed a jihad against the British Empire in November 1914, and by 1915, there was serious discontent among the Indian Muslim soldiers who were extremely unhappy about fighting Ottoman Muslims on behalf of the British. By contrast, the Hindu and Sikh soldiers stayed loyal to the British. By the autumn of 1915, Townshend faced with increasing desertions by his Indian Muslim troops sent all of his Muslim soldiers, numbering about 1,000 back to Basra, saying that Indian Muslims would rather desert than fight other Muslims (however, Townshend retained the Muslims serving as support troops). The Indian Muslims complained that it was blasphemous that they should be expected to fight near the tomb of Suliman Pak, the barber of the Prophet Mohammed and preferred to desert to the enemy (though the Ottomans were not troubled by the prospect of fighting near the tomb of Suliman Pak). Townshend asked that Nixon send all of the British soldiers working as policemen, clerks and batmen in Basra up to the front to replace the Indian Muslims Townshend had sent away from the front, a request that Nixon refused. Relations between Nixon and Townshend were extremely poor and Nixon went out of his way to make things difficult for Townshend. By this time, Townshend had advanced over 500 miles up the Tigris and he was at the end of a long and tenuous supply line that was stretched more and more as he continued way up the river. Supplies from Basra were brought up in mahelas, a type of Arab sailing boat with enormous sails that moved very slowly at the best of times. A further problem for the Anglo-Indian forces was the lack of hospital ships for the treatment of the wounded and sick and by the autumn of 1915, illness had incapacitated much of the Anglo-Indian forces. In a letter to his friend in the War Office, Townshend wrote: "We have certainly not good enough troops to make certain of taking Baghdad, which I fear is being fortified..." and going on to warn that a retreat from Baghdad would mean "an instant rising of the Arabs of the whole country behind us", adding that the Persians and the Afghans would likely be swept up by the Pan-Islamic propaganda of the Ottomans to join the jihad against the Allies. Townshend wrote that: "We ought to hold what we have got and not advance anymore...All these offensive operations in secondary theatres are dreadful errors in strategy: the Dardanelles, Egypt, Mesopotamia, East Africa!". Townshend believed the main theatre of the war that would decide its outcome were the operations in France and Flanders, and believed that Britain should be concentrating its strength in Europe, observing that if Germany were defeated, the war would be won, but if the Ottoman Empire were defeated, Germany would still have to be defeated. However, the egomaniac Townshend wrote in a letter to his wife Alice 17 days later: "I told you, darling, that I only wanted my chance! You should have seen the British and Indian soldiers cheering me as I stood on the Comet. I must have the gift of making men (I mean the soldier men) love me and follow me. I only known the 6th Division for six months and they'd storm the gates of hell if I told them to".

Having argued for another extension of the mission, and obtained approval for it from the British Government, Townshend's counsel was over-ridden by Nixon and he was ordered to continue with an advance upon Baghdad without reinforcement. On 24 October 1915, Townshend was ordered to take Baghdad. With the Battle of Gallipoli stalemated, 30,000 battle-hardened Ottoman troops under the command of Khalil Bey to assist with the defense of Baghdad. Furthermore, the Tigris had become too shallow for the Royal Navy boats that had provided such useful fire support and Townshend would have to do without their services as he set out for Baghdad. Even through Townshend had advised against a further advance, his aggression and ambitions soon started to press him otherwise, especially as he had nothing but contempt for the enemy. Townshend claimed in My Campaign in Mesopotamia to have been opposed to advancing on Baghdad after receiving the orders from Nixon, but at the time he expressed no opposition and was all for advancing onto Baghdad. At the time, Townshend reported meeting some stiff resistance from the Ottomans, but predicted that his men would advance rapidly once they had broken into the open country, which he stated would happen soon, further adding that a KCB was the greatest military honour that would please both himself and his family. Townshend was encouraged in his optimism as he had seriously underestimated the Ottoman numbers, believing he was faced with less than 10,000 Ottomans when he in fact he was going up against more than 20,000. After Neuve Chapelle, Loos and Gallipoli, the government was looking desperately for a success and the Prime Minister H. H. Asquith after seeing Townshend's advance was more than inclined to believe in the reports of Nixon and Townshend that they would soon take Baghdad, giving his approval out of the hope that taking Baghdad would at long last give his government a victory.

On 1 November 1915 Townshend led the 6th (Poona) Division from Kut-al-Amara and marched up the course of the River Tigris. Ctesiphon, some 25 miles (40 km) south of Baghdad was reached on 20 November 1915. Here they met an Ottoman force of more than twenty thousand troops that had issued from Baghdad to oppose their approach to the city, giving them a numerical advantage of 2 to 1 over the 6th (Poona) Division, sited within well-prepared defensive trench fortifications. General Nurreddin Pasha had the command of four divisions, namely the 35th, the 38th, the 45th and 51st which he had dug in at trenches built over the ruins of Ctesiphon. At Ctesiphon, Townshend was obsessed with the Arch of Ctesiphon. Strachan stated:

"The centre of the battlefield of Ctesiphon is the Arch, and it figures in all of the photographs of the Army when they reached this high point of the advance. And its immensely powerful for Townshend, the student of military history, because this marks the extremity of the Roman Empire, this marks the point where Belisarius, the famous Roman commander, had got to, coming in the other direction, of course. But for those with a classical education, as of course just about every British officer had received before the First World War, then this is a very powerful image indeed".

Townshend had divided his division into four columns. To Column A, he assigned the Dorset regiment, the 104th Rifles and the Thirtieth Composite Brigade to which he attached two Gurkha companies. To Column B, Townshend assigned the Norfolk regiment, the 7th Rajputs and the 110th Mahrattas. To Column C went the Oxfordshire Light Infantry, the Twenty-second Punjabi regiment, the 103rd Mahrattas and 119th Infantry. And finally to Column D went the 7th Lancers, the Sixteenth Cavalry, the Thirty-third Cavalry and S battery of the Royal Horse Artillery. Townshend's plans called the Principle Mass "either to throw the Turks into the Tigris or compel them to a disastrous flight across the Diala river, some six miles behind them". Column C was to attack Nureddin Pasha's right flank to distract him while the "Principle Mass" of Columns A and B were to attack the left flank of the Ottoman lines while Column D was to race around the Ottoman positions to attack from the rear. Townshend was in a notably bad mood before the battle and much to the shock of his servant Boggis savagely beat his dog Spot when he found Spot cuddled up next to Boggis asleep. When Boggis asked: "What are you doing that for sir?", he received the reply: "He was sleeping with you! He's my dog and he's got to learn!". Boggis later recalled that Townshend was a "harsh bastard" who treated his men no better than he treated Spot.

==== Setback at Ctesiphon ====
The battle that followed was hard-fought over two days starting on 22 November 1915, with Generals Townshend and Nixon both being personally involved in the fighting. The Ottoman force consisted of about 25,000 men, but British intelligence had estimated the Ottoman force as about 9, 500. The battle began with Hoghton leading Column C in an attack in the early morning mist with the men of Column C using the outline of the Arch of Ctesiphon as their guide that quickly brought down murderous Ottoman fire on his men. In the meantime, General Delamain led Column A under heavy Ottoman fire to capture the Vital Point (V.P.) later that morning. After the capture of the V.P, Townshend believed that the battle was won, only to discover much to his shock that the Ottoman Army was much larger than he had thought and his forces were at the receiving end of a vigorous Ottoman counterattack.

During the fighting at Ctesiphon, Townshend suddenly demanded a change of uniform, which required his manservant Boggis to run across a mile of battlefield in order to bring Townshend his new uniform. Once Boggis returned, Townshend stripped himself naked in full view of his men before putting on "a silk vest, silk underpants, a khaki shirt, his breeches, boots and sunhelmet and, picking up his binoculars, eating a piece of plum cake passed to him by a junior officer, resumed his inspection of the battle". Amid much heavy fighting, Column D was which to strike the Ottoman lines from the rear was intercepted by an Ottoman cavalry force under Halil Kut, leading to a swirling cavalry action in the desert that ended in a draw, but strategically was a defeat for the British as it ended Townshend's hope of having his cavalry smash into the rear of the Ottoman forces.

As the Ottoman forces counter-attacked, Townshend was forced to pull back as his forces were outnumbered. He claimed that the withdrawal was due to the Indian troops under his command pulling back without orders, something which Townshend ascribed to significant numbers of their British officers being killed or wounded. After a hard day's fighting, he ordered what was left of his division to dig in while Nureddin Pasha ordered his troops to pull back; Townshend quickly began reorganising his men to defend against another Ottoman attack. On the next day, Nureddin Pasha ordered a general attack with the aim of destroying Townshend's force.

Amid the ruins of Ctesiphon, Ottoman forces attacked the British and Indian defenders, with the fiercest fighting occurring at the Water Redoubt where about 100 men of the 22nd Punjabi Regiment and about 300 Gurkhas stood their ground and beat off successive attacks by the 35th Ottoman Division. One of Nureddin Pasha's staff officers, Muhammad Amin, later wrote that it was amazing that this "brave and determined little force" had stopped an entire Ottoman division and finally pushed them back to their second line of defence. Townshend, "quick enough to criticize the performance of his Indian troops", made no mention in his post-war writings of the action at the Water Redoubt. After the second day of fighting, Nureddin Pasha ordered his men to withdraw. The Ottomans had suffered more dead and wounded at Ctesiphon, but Nureddin's greater size of forces could sustain his losses, continue to fight while the smaller size of Townshend's division meant that his losses at Ctesiphon were proportionally more costly.

The result of the battle was indecisive, both sides having sustained heavy losses. Townshend had defeated Nureddin Pasha at Ctesiphon, but the losses taken by the 6th Division were such a further advance towards Baghdad was impossible. At this point Townshend, finding himself almost four hundred miles deep into hostile country leading a lone Division that had lost one-third of its men in casualties, with inadequate facilities for their medical evacuation, with a tenuously over-stretched line of supply, and facing multiple hostile divisions issuing from Baghdad towards his force with no other substantive British Empire forces within reach to call upon for assistance, resolved to retire back to Kut-al-Amara seeking shelter for the 6th (Poona) Division, and await for reinforcements in accordance with his original intentions. As Townshend retreated, Nureddin Pasha was in hot pursuit with the aim of destroying the 6th Division.

On 1 December 1915 Nureddin caught up with Townshend at the village of Umm al-Tubul (the "Mother of Tombs") where a sharp action occurred that ended with the Ottomans being driven off with heavy losses. The Ottoman setback at Umm al-Tubul gave Townshend and his men several days lead over the pursuing Ottoman forces as the bloody nose that Nuredddin took at Umm al-Tubul had disorganised his troops, and it took him some time to reorganise his men. Townshend arrived back in Kut on 3 December 1915 after a retreat harassed by pursuing fresh Ottoman troops that had appeared on the scene post-battle. On 7 December the pursuing Ottoman force surrounded and besieged Kut-al-Amara, trapping the 6th (Poona) Division within its walls. The British historian Russell Braddon wrote: "After Ctesiphon, in his telegrams, communiques, diaries and autobiography, he [Townshend] reveals himself as a man whose mind was governed almost entirely by wishful thinking".

==== Siege of Kut-al-Amara 1916 ====
The siege of Kut-al-Amara was a drawn out affair for the British Empire, and a bitter one for the men of the 6th (Poona) Division, being surrounded for five months under fire from all sides, and having to fight off several attempts to storm the town by the Turks, with dwindling resources in conditions of increasing desperation and deprivation. Townshend began to fall to pieces when he realized that he would not take Baghdad after all, a blow that was quite psychologically shattering for him. Strachan commented that:

"...retreating from Ctesiphon for Townshend shatters his dreams of a glorious entry into Baghdad, and that clearly has a profound impact on his decision-making. From Townshend's point of view it could lead to the preference of one of his fellow generals: for example, Major-General Gorringe might get the coveted promotion to lieutenant-general. Even worse, it could lead to the Mesopotamian campaign doing what Townshend's strategic brain told him it ought to do, which is becoming a backwater, any hope of seizing Baghdad being abandoned, and of course any hope of anyone making their military reputation and getting their promotions also being abandoned: the dire possibility of yet again being in another military backwater while the action is elsewhere and the limelight is elsewhere...The ability to sustain a siege was one way of guaranteeing a high profile. The Siege of Mafeking had made Baden-Powell's reputation, had made Baden-Powell into a household name and had prompted enormous jubilation when the siege had been lifted. So he knew full well that conducting a siege was a more satisfactory way to, or more likely to be a successful way to achieve public adulation than simply conducting a very successful fighting retreat down the Tigris back towards Basra".

Townshend could have retreated back to Basra if he had wanted to do so, but instead he chose to make his stand at Kut. Townshend chose to fortify Kut out of the hope of repeating his success at Chitral in 1895, knowing that if the Ottomans besieged him at Kut, then the British Army would have to send out a relief force to break the siege. Townshend's decision to allow the Ottomans to besiege him and his men at Kut was taken to allow him to come out of the campaign as a hero just as he had at Chitral rather for any compelling military reasons. Townshend claimed that his men were exhausted and could not march anymore, hence his decision to stop at Kut. General William Delamian, one of Townshend's subordinates was to later write that this claim was a lie and after a day's rest at Kut, the men of the 6th Division could have easily continued to march if only Townshend had given the order. Perry wrote: "The fact is, Townshend wanted to endure a siege at Kut". Townshend (who had been part of the relief expedition to save Charles Gordon at Khartoum) had been greatly influenced by how the British press had lionized Gordon, and wished to be lionized by Fleet Street in the same way. However, Perry noted the difference between "Chinese Gordon" and Townshend as: "Needless to say, Townshend had no death wish, simply an obsessive ambition to be promoted and to be recognized as the great warrior he thought himself to be. What he wanted, and no seems to have thought about this, was to be a live Gordon-to endure a heroic siege, be rescued by Nixon (or somebody else), and go home to England in triumph". Townshend arrived in Kut on 3 December 1915 and it was not until 9 December 1915 that the Ottomans finally surrounded Kut, in the interim Townshend had blown up the bridges over the Tigris that could have allowed his men to continue to march south. Townshend claimed that Kut was strategic because it was at the intersection of the Tigris and Hai rivers, but in fact the "Hai river" was only a flood effluent of the Tigris. Kut was on a peninsula in the Tigris river allowed the Ottomans to by-pass it. Galbraith wrote that "Kut's great importance was not strategic, but political". Townshend in his diary: "I mean to defend Kut as I did Chitral". As many of the boats and ships that used the Tigris had been sunk or captured by the British during their advance up the river, the Ottomans did not depend upon river transport to the extent that the British, and the location of Kut on a peninsula in the Tigris meant the Ottomans easily by-passed the town.

On 8 December 1915, the Ottomans made their first major artillery bombardment of Kut, using their German-made Krupp guns. The 35th Ottoman division was unable to take Kut, but brought the Ottoman trenches closer to the town. In response, Townshend had the bridge of boats across the Tigris blown up to prevent the Ottomans from entering the town. Kut was besieged by the 38th, 45th and 51st divisions of the Ottoman Army. Townshend sent an appeal for help, saying that immediate relief was necessary as his men were suffering 150-200 casualties per day and that morale was collapsing.

On 10 December 1915, General Nureddin Pasha ordered his men to storm Kut, but Townshend repelled the Ottoman assaulting force with heavy losses, through the Ottomans seized enough ground to build another line closer to the walls of Kut. On Christmas Day 1915, the Ottomans made another attempt to storm Kut and at one point broke through to seize part of the old fort at Kut, before fierce British counter-attacks drove them out. The men of 52nd Ottoman Division were able to enter Kut, but were driven back amid hand-to-hand fighting with bayonets and hand grenades by the sepoys of the 103rd and 119th brigades and the Oxfordshire and Buckinghamshire Light Infantry. Afterwards, Goltz arrived and forbade any more attempts to storm Kut, instead preferring to keep Kut under regular artillery bombardment while waiting for Townshend's men to be starved into surrender. The Ottomans were armed with 30 of the latest Krupp artillery guns from Germany that provided devastating fire that destroyed much of Kut. Townshend complained in his memoirs: "The fire from our guns went from the centre to the circumference and so was divergent and disseminated, while that of the enemy was directed from the circumference to the centre and his converged and concentrated". To avoid the Ottoman fire, Townshend and his men were forced to live a largely subterranean existence as they had to dig in under the ruins of Kut. Major Charles Barber, the chief medical officer at Kut recalled how the Anglo-Indian soldiers were tortured by "myriads" of lice, stating: "Our wretched patients would sit for hours picking them off their blankets and shirts". Besides for lice, the men were attacked by plagues of fleas "and if not fleas, then mosquitoes, failing mosquitoes, or in addition to, the sand fly is provided". Finally Major Barber recalled "there is always the snake, the centipede or the scorpion to fall back upon". The shortage of firewood led to the soldiers being served only hot meal per day and the soldiers were usually wet and cold.

On 13 January 1916, the attempt by Alymer to relief Kut ended in defeat at the Battle of the Wadi fought under heavy rains, which impeded the advance of the Indian troops against the Ottoman lines. Nurredin Pasha was promoted and replaced with Khalil Bey as the Ottoman commander. In his communique of 26 January 1916, Townshend dismissed Alymer's efforts by saying that he defeated greater Ottoman forces in the summer of 1915 than what Almer was facing in January 1916, though he neglected to mention that Alymer was facing battle-hardened troops sent straight from the Battle of Gallipoli and the heavy rains, which turned the countryside into semi-flooded wasteland.

General Townshend sent reports about his supplies to his commander General Nixon (now back in Basra) to induce immediate reinforcement from the Mesopotamian Expeditionary Force's base there, which were exaggerated to the point of being misleading. He indicated that he only had supplies for a month at full ration, however, in reality, his troops finally ran out of supplies near the end of April 1916, almost five months later. This led the British Government, under pressure from the London press's portrayal of Townshend as a hero once again surrounded by Oriental hordes in desperate circumstances (as he had been during the Siege of Chitral 21 years before), to order the hasty dispatch of a military relief force from Basra, which was defeated on arrival at Kut by the unexpectedly strong Ottoman defenses under the direction of the newly arrived Prussian Field Marshal Colmar von der Goltz. Townshend's distorted reports about the food situation, claiming he had only enough food to last until 17 February led Sir Fenton Aylmer to make series of desperate attacks to break the siege in January 1916. Aylmer's troops were at the end of such badly stretched supply lines that he had a serious shortage of artillery shells and all of Aylmer's attempts to break the siege ended in failure. Aylmer later wrote that if he knew that Townshend had enough food to last until April that he would never had launched his premature attacks in January and would have waited until he had stockpiled enough artillery shells for an offensive. The heavy rains that started after Christmas 1915 further added to the discomfort of both besieged and besiegers as the ground turned into mud. Shortages of firewood in Kut meant that a fire to warm one's bones became a luxury amid the heavy rains.

Nixon might have able to relieve Kut had he done a better job of managing logistics. Sir George Buchanan, the engineer who managed the port of Rangoon in Burma visited Basra in late 1915 and described a scene of utter chaos. Buchanan reported to London: "I had never before in my life seen such a hopeless mess and muddle and I wondered whether this was the usual accompaniment of war. It seemed incredible that we should have been in operation of Basra for over a year, yet so little had been done in the intervening time". Basra was not a modern port, but rather an anchorage besides the banks of the Shatt-al-Arab river beyond which was a vast swamp. At any given movement, there was a line of 14 ships waiting to unload their cargos at Basra and it took an average of six weeks for a ship to unload its cargo at Basra in 1915. Buchanan further reported that Nixon was such an utterly inept general that he did not see the inefficient way in which the port of Basra was being run as a problem, and told Buchanan that his expertise at managing the port of Rangoon was not needed here in Basra. It was largely the logistical problems posed by the mismanagement of Basra that doomed the relief expeditions sent out to save Townshend and his men at Kut. In February–March 1916 a number of new divisions arrived at Basra, but the supply bottlenecks at Basra meant the British were unable to deploy them in the relief of Kut. Nixon's efforts to hinder any attempt to build modern port facilities such as cranes for unloading goods off ships were a major reason why he was sacked in early 1916. Furthermore, Nixon was told that the steamers that he needed to transport men and supplies up the Tigris would be available in March 1916 at the earliest.

On 1 March 1916, the heaviest Ottoman bombardment of Kut yet took place along with a bombing raid by three German aircraft. The Ottomans were observed unloading mysterious metal cylinders from a barrage, which were assumed by the besieged to contain poison gas. Townshend called the proposed use of chemical warfare "a cowardly barbarism worthy of Chinese pirates". Townshend continued to send radio messages to London asking for a promotion, which caused much ill-will. In an attempt to relive Kut, the Russian general Baratov marched from Iran towards Baghdad, but his progress was slow. On 8 March 1916, Alymer launched another relief operation under heavy rain, which ended in failure. In his communiques to his troops, Townshend blamed Alymer for the failure of the relief attempts despite the fact that his division was outnumbered. Townshend promised that "an English division" would soon be coming to save them with the implication that the relief attempts by 3rd, 6h, 7th, and 12th divisions of the Indian Army had failed because Indian Army divisions were not of the same quality as British Army divisions. Toe Ottoman general Khalil Pasha sent a demand for surrender, which led Townshend to write back: "I thanked him for his courtesy and said I was glad to find again as I had found in my operations at Kut-al-Amarah and Ctesiphon that the Turk was a good soldier and a gentleman". On 15 March 1916, Townshend cut his rations to 10 ounces of barley bread and 1.5 ounces of horse flesh for his British troops and 8 ounces of barley bread and four ounces of parched barely for his Indian troops. Townshed wrote: "The effects of the recluse were soon apparent among m troops. There was a general feeling of gloom and depression, and desertion amongst the Indian troops increased; the Arabs of the town now looked upon our course as lost. If I had been luck enough to find the hidden grain at Kut we should had fallen by the first week of March".

Subsequent increasingly desperate relief expeditions dispatched from Basra to attempt to rescue the 6th (Poona) Division fared equally badly against the defences erected against their passage by Goltz (who would not himself see the military victory of the siege, dying of typhoid in Baghdad before its end). When Townshend reported that his men were running out of food, London ordered him to break out to link up with the relief force commanded by Sir Fenton Aylmer (who had also saved Townshend at Chitral), Townshend suddenly "discovered" that he had enough food to hold out longer and a break-out was unnecessary; from Townshend's viewpoint it was better from a public relations standpoint if Aylmer should break the siege rather him breaking out to link up with Aylmer. One attempt reached a point just 10 miles (16 km) from Kut, but repeated assaults against Turkish positions trying to break through them to reach the town failed. The last effort, after three weeks of attacks, took place on 22 April 1916, but also ended in failure. The British were to lose 26,000 men killed in the attempts to break the siege of Kut while Townshend refused to make any effort to break out of Kut, saying it was up for General Aylmer to break in. During the siege, Townshend displayed in the words of Regan a "profound egotism and a disgraceful neglect for his men". Much of Townshend's time was spent sending radio messages back to London asking for a promotion and inquiring about his friends in London such as "actors and gaiety girls" while he spent an inordinate amount of his time making certain that his dog Spot did not suffer from the siege, a tender concern that did not extend to the ordinary British and Indian soldiers under his command. Despite the fact that by the end of the siege, much of the Anglo-Indian garrison were either slowly starving to death and/or dying of diseases, Townshend never visited the hospital although he found time to take Spot out for a daily walk and to spend his afternoon reading works of military history in French. A 1923 report by the British Army about Kut concluded that "visits by the commander and his staff to the troops would have even more effective" at sustaining morale rather his "barrage of communiqués" that Townshend unleashed. Townshend spent almost all of his time either in his headquarters, a two-story mud house writing up messages or "gazing out across the Turkish lines from his observation post on the roof". When Townshend learned that Aylmer had been replaced with Gorringe as commander of the relief force, he was heard to say: "But he's junior to me!" This was a mere prelude to Townshend going into a bout of hysteria as he began jumping up and down, screaming and crying his eyes out that it was completely unfair for him to be rescued by a general junior to himself like Gorringe rather than a general of equal rank like Aylmer, saying how he was supposed to come out of this siege a hero if the rescue force was commanded by a general of lower rank than himself.

Townshend was gravely offended by the decision to give command of the relief force to Gorringe, sending out a long radio message saying giving the command to Gorringe was "a slight on my record of service...I am deeply concerned to have brought up the question of promotion at so inopportune a time, but my active-service record is a honourable one and like my family before me for the past 300 years, I have served the state well". The British psychologist Norman F. Dixon wrote that Townshend's often irrational behaviour at Kut was due to "cognitive dissonance", writing:

"No better example [of cognitive dissonance] is afforded than that of Townshend's occupation of Kut. Since his advance up the Tigris was totally unjustified by facts of which he was fully aware, his dissonance, when disaster struck, must have been extreme and, to a man of his egotistical nature, demanding of instant resolution. So, again, in the face of much contrary evidence, he withdrew into Kut. The wiser and possible course of retreating to Basra would have been a greater admission of the lack of justification for his previous decision. By the same token, once inside Kut nothing would budge him, because to break out, even to assist those who had been sent to release him, would have emphasised his lack of justification for being there in the first place. In short, an inability to admit one has been in the wrong will be greater the more wrong one has been, and the more wrong one has been, the more bizarre will be subsequent attempts to justify the unjustifiable".

When a British artillery officer almost killed Goltz with a well-aimed shot (Goltz stood out by dressing in the full uniform of a Prussian field marshal and because of his weight), Townshend was extremely angry, saying that he did not want Goltz killed because if he had to surrender Kut, it was much better to surrender to a German officer rather an Ottoman officer. By the end of the siege, Townshend's men were living on five ounces of bread/per day and a slice of mule meat.

Townshend grew increasingly desperate as the siege went on, at one time sending off a message claiming that if Kut fell, it would be a worse defeat than Yorktown, maintaining that the entire Islamic world would rally for the Ottomans if he had to surrender and this would be the beginning of the end of the British Empire. In March 1916, the Ottomans began particular heavy bombardments of Kut, and the Ottomans were seen unloading mysterious canisters from a barge, which everyone assumed was poison gas from Germany. Morale began to collapse among the Indians as more and more Indians began to desert, there were several cases of Indian soldiers killing their NCOs and many Indians began to engage in self-mutilation to get themselves into the presumed safety of the hospital. Whenever news of German advances at the Battle of Verdun reached the Ottoman lines, the Turks would give a giant three cheers for Germany while Townshend was comforted when he received a message over the radio that the Russians had taken by storm the allegedly impregnable Ottoman city-fortress of Erzerum, which he believed meant the Russians would soon relief him. The fall of Erzerum, which allowed the Russians to advance into Asia Minor, brought Townshend more time as the Ottomans rushed troops into Anatolia to deal with the Russian advance, and to orders that there would be no more assaults against Kut.

On the night of 5 April 1916, Townshend searched the skyline for any sign of the relief attempt by Gorringe, leading him to send a barrage of messages over the radio asking where Gorringe was. Townshend was informed that all of Gorringe's attacks had been beaten back by the Ottomans. On 10 April 1916, Townshend cut the rations of his men while sending a request for food to be air-dropped into Kut. Complicating matters for both the besieged and besiegers was that the Tigris rose by three feet in 24 hours, causing flooding in both Kut and the area around it. Townshend in a message on 11 April 1916 blamed that the fact that his men were starving to death due to the unwillingness of the Indian soldiers to eat horses due to religious reasons. By the end of March 1916, about 500 of Townshend's men were suffering from scurvy, which he blamed on the unwillingness to eat horses. On 16 April 1916, the Royal Flying Corps made their first airdrops on food into Kut. However, the airplanes could be flown at dawn or dusk owing to the extreme heat and dropped food from a height of 6,000 feet to avoid anti-aircraft fire, which caused much of the food to land in either the Tigris or onto the Ottoman lines. Townshend's staff estimated that some 5,000 pounds of grain needed to be airdropped per day while only 1, 600 pounds were airdropped. On 17 April 1916 and again on 22 April 1916, the last two attempts to relive Kut ended in failure, which led a strong sense of despair to emerge in Kut as it became apparent that the garrison was doomed. An attempt to run in food on the boat Julnar ended in failure on 24 April 1916 with the boat being shot up and stranded on the Tigris.

In late April 1916, Townshend came up with a desperate plan to bribe the Ottomans into letting him and his men leave Kut, an offer that Halil Pasha took up, engaging in talks with Captain Thomas Edward Lawrence of the Cairo Intelligence Staff, before publicising the British offer to humiliate them. Halil Pasha knew the Anglo-Indian garrison was starving to death, and he had the upper hand. Having run out of food for the Garrison, General Townshend yielded Kut-al-Amara to the besieging Turks on 29 April 1916, the 6th (Poona) Division surrendering en masse. During the siege, the 6th Division had lost 1,746 men between 9 December 1915 – 29 April 1916. When negotiating the surrender of Kut to General Halil Pasha, Townshend's main concern was to make certain that the Ottomans would not mistreat Spot (who they promised they would send back to Britain, a promise that Halil Pasha kept). Townshend found it deeply humiliating to surrender to a Turkish Muslim like Halil Pasha rather than the German Lutheran Goltz as he would have preferred. Major Barber described the victors as: "Their uniforms were ragged and patched in all directions. Their boots were worn beyond hope of repair, and they were generally the most disreputable-looking specimens of a modern army. But they were good-natured fellows-broad, strong as oxen, with plenty of bone, ruddy complexions and in many cases blue eyes and ginger whiskers. They looked like what they were, I suppose-just easy-going, illiterate Anatolian peasantry". The news of the fall of Kut was received with enormous sadness all over the British Empire while prompting jubilation all over the Ottoman Empire with Enver Pasha telling a vast cheering crowd waving the Ottoman flags in Istanbul that Allah was truly with the Ottomans as He had humbled the British first at Gallipol and now at Kut. The German Emperor Wilhlem II praised Townshend's defeat in a press statement as a "shining monument to German-Turkish brotherhood in arms", claiming that it was Goltz who had done most of the work at Kut, a statement which offended his Ottoman allies who disliked the implication of the Kaiser's press statement that they would have failed at Kut on their own, and needed German officers to lead them to victory. All of the people of Kut who were deemed to have collaborated with the British during the siege were publicly hanged as an example to those who would betray the Ottoman Empire.

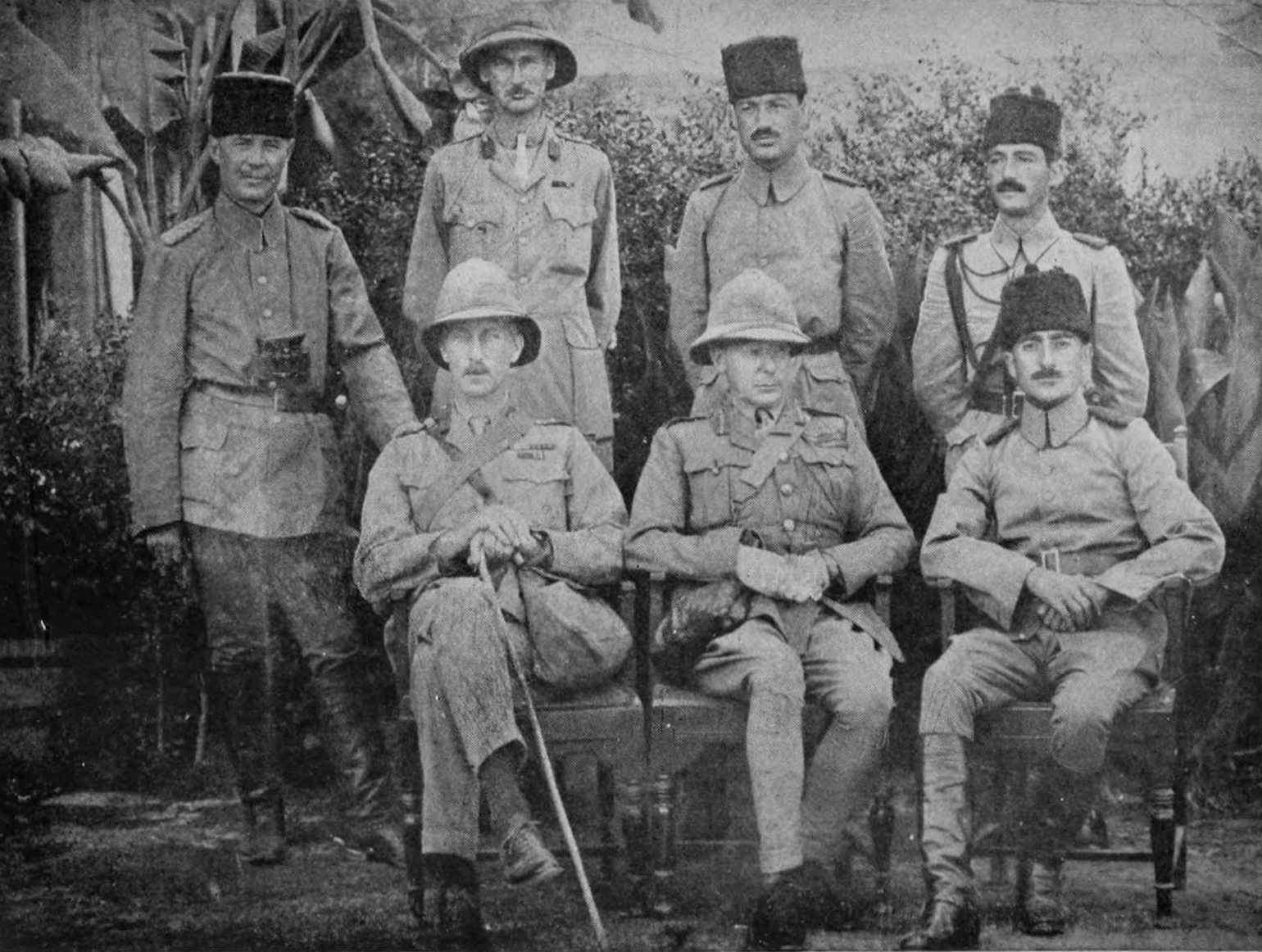
Major General Townshend, Turkish regional governor Halil Kut and unidentified officers after the siege of Kut, 1916.

On 2 May 1916, Townshend was taken in an Ottoman motor boat up the Tigris to Baghdad and was run past by his men, who cheered him as he saluted in return. Despite the whips of the guards who tried to keep their charges marching down the road, the POWs rushed to the bank of the Tigris to cheer their general on as he sped past them, shouting "Three cheers for our brave general! Hip-hip-hurrah!". It was the last time that most of Townshend's men were to see him. The Ottomans provided their POWs with a few hardened biscuits for food. Braddon wrote that after eating the biscuits: "The following morning, they began to die. Frothing at the mouth, their bowels and stomachs disintegrating into a greenish slime, dehydrated and moaning, they died one after the other". The illness that afflicted the British and Indian POWs was enteritis that was contained within the biscuits. After the surrender, the Ottomans forced the British and Indian POWs to embark upon a brutal "death march" to POW camps in Anatolia, during which the prisoners were forced to march under the scorching hot sun while being deprived of water, food and medical care while constantly being whipped by the Kurdish and Arab tribesmen the Ottoman state had hired to guard them; those who faltered on the "death march" were shot on the spot. In the evening, the men on the death march were given biscuits to eat and water to drink. The only reason why the guards kept their charges alive was to rape them and during the course of the death march all of the POWs were repeatedly gang-raped. McKnight stated in an interview that: "Once they arrived in the prisoner-of-war camps, conditions were little better and hundreds died every month from starvation or being beaten to death by the odd casually brutal Turkish guard". The Indian Muslims serving as support troops at Kut were the only POWs (other than the officers) who were well-treated by the Ottomans and many promptly joined the Ottoman Army to fight against the British. When the Ottoman Empire signed the Armistice of Mudros on 30 October 1918, only 30% of the British and Indian soldiers taken prisoner at Kut in April 1916 were still alive with the other 70% having died in either the death march or in the POW camps. By contrast, Townshend and his officers were well treated. Only one of the officers who surrendered at Kut, the commander of a Gurkha company chose to go on the death march with his men while the rest of the officers accepted the Ottoman offer to be held separately from the other ranks. After finally making it to Baghdad where he was given a guided tour of various cultural sites, Townshend was taken to the capital of Constantinople where he was greeted with a formal guard of honour at the railroad station led by the Ottoman Minister of War, General Enver Pasha. During his trip to Constantinople, Townshend saw at least once the battered, starving, thirsty and broken-down remnants of his division travelling north on the death march. Townshend raised the subject once with Enver (who already knew about the death march as he had the POWs marched past him during a victory parade he had attended in Baghdad) who assured him that he knew nothing about the death march, but he would look into it. This was the first and only time that Townshend ever expressed concern about how his men were being treated as POWs.

Townshend claimed that the siege of Kut had "saved us from simply being kicked out of Mesopotamia". However, the Ottoman forces at Kut were at the end of a long supply line in the form of camel convoys and even if they had wanted to march on the Persian Gulf, would have had to face British and Indian divisions well dug in further south, making the siege unnecessary to stop the Ottoman from trying to take Basra.

=== Prisoner of war ===
Townshend was well treated by his Ottoman captors. He was transported to Istanbul where he was quartered in comfort for the remainder of the war on the island of Heybeliada in the Sea of Marmara before being transferred over to the island of Prinkipo (now Büyükada, Turkey). During his time in Istanbul, Townshend became friends with General Enver Pasha, the Ottoman minister of war who treated him as an honoured guest. Enver spoke no English while Townshend spoke no Turkish, but they were both fluent in French, and in that language they held their conversations in. Townshend was quoted in Ottoman newspapers as saying he was pleased to be "the honored quest of Enver Pasha's nation" (a statement that he did not deny making after the war). Townshend was given use of a Turkish naval yacht, and took part in receptions held in his honour at the Sultan's palace. Whilst still in captivity in 1917 he was made a Knight Commander of the Order of the Bath (KCB) by the British Government. The German newspaper editor Friedrich Schrader reported that Townshend appeared personally in the Istanbul offices of his newspaper Osmanischer Lloyd to receive the cable from London announcing the award. About Townshend's behaviour in Constantinople, Dixon commented:

"Underneath the agreeable veneer lay a fatal flaw that showed itself in a ravenous, self-destructive hunger for popular acclaim. Through its origins remain obscure, Townshend gave the impression of a man who at some time had suffered traumatic damage to his self-esteem, which resulted in an everlasting need to be loved"

Townshend tried very hard to get his wife Alice to join him in his captivity, writing that he being allowed to live in an English-style country house, the Villa Hampson on the island of Prinkipo in the Sea of Marmara, telling her how very happy he would be if she were to join him on Prinkipo. Alice Townshend refused her husband's invitations, and presciently warned him that the impression that he was enjoying his captivity too much would not help his image in Britain. In contrast to the fate of his men dying in POW camps in Anatolia, the most damaging event to Townshend that occurred during his captivity was in 1917 when he learned that his first cousin had fathered a son, which meant that Townshend would not inherit the title of marquess or Raynham Hall after all, news that he took very badly. During the First World War, the Ottoman state carried out mass deportation campaigns against the Armenian minority, which attracted widespread unfavorable publicity around the world. The favourable treatment of Townshend was largely because he served the public relations needs of the Ottoman state as Enver cannily manipulated Townshend's obsessive need to have the great and mighty pay attention to him for his own advantage. Townshend's willingness to praise Enver Pasha in public for his generous hospitality and to issue press statements attacking the British for alleged mistreatment of Ottoman POWs in Egypt served to distract attention from what the Ottomans were doing to the Armenians. At the war's end Townshend, as the most senior British imperial official in Istanbul at that moment, was involved in the negotiations for the Ottoman Empire's military surrender to the British Empire's advancing Egyptian Expeditionary Force in October 1918. Townshend's claim made on his return to Britain that the entire Armistice of Mudros was all his work led to an annoyed Field Marshal Edmund Allenby to issue a corrective statement saying that Townshend did indeed play a role in negotiating the Armistice of Mudros, but he had greatly exaggerated his role by claiming that the armistice was all his work.

== Post-war ==
Townshend returned to England in 1919. Much to Townshend's fury, only his wife Alice and daughter Audrey together with his beloved dog Spot showed up to greet him as he arrived back in London as he was expecting to receive a hero's welcome. Townshend asked for a major promotion on the account of his war work and he was refused; likewise the Army made it clear that no assignments were open to him anywhere in the entire Empire. He resigned from the British Army in 1920 after it become clear that his career was finished, and published his war memoir, My Campaign in Mesopotamia (1920). On 24 May 1915, after learning of the "Great Crime" as Armenians call the Armenian genocide, the British, French and Russian governments issued a joint statement accusing the Ottoman government of "crimes against humanity", the first time in history that this term had been used. The British, French and Russians further promised that once the war was won that they would put the Ottoman leaders responsible for the Armenian genocide on trial for crimes against humanity. After the war, the British government made a serious effort between 1919–1922 to organise trials for the leaders of the Committee of Union and Progress for crimes against humanity and war crimes. In particular the British wanted to arrest General Enver Pasha, Talaat Pasha and General Djemal Pasha in order to bring them to trial. The main focus on the planned trials was the Armenian genocide, but the British also wanted to try those responsible for the death march and mistreatment of the POWs captured at Kut. Townshend during his captivity had become very friendly with Enver Pasha, and made it clear that he would testify for the defence if Enver were brought to trial, denying that the death march had even occurred. As it was, politics prevented the trials from ever happening, but Townshend's willingness to testify for the accused did not help his image in Britain.

Townshend entered politics, standing as an Independent Conservative candidate (i.e. not supporting Lloyd George's Coalition Government) in a by-election in Shropshire, and was elected in another by-election as the Member of Parliament for The Wrekin (1920–1922). However post-war reports surfaced about how badly the troops under his command had suffered at the hands of the Turkish Army as prisoners of war after their capture at the fall of Kut-al-Amara, thousands of them having died in Ottoman captivity, many having been brutalized and murdered. Townshend's daring imperial hero reputation lost much of its former lustre. Post-war military commentators and historians were increasingly critical of his failure to defeat the Ottoman Empire's force at Ctesiphon, his apparent passivity during the siege of Kut – having led the men under his command into an entrapment, and making no subsequent attempt to break out of it, his inaccurate reports claiming rations were running low which had led to the hasty first relief expedition's military defeat with heavy casualties, and his apparent unseemly acceptance of the privileges of the gilded caged status that he had been accorded at Ottoman largesse, which contrasted adversely with the treatment from the same authority of the men under his command who had gone into captivity with him. By the time of his death in 1924, his military reputation lay under a shadow in consequence.

== Personal life and family ==
On 22 November 1898, Townshend married Alice Cahen d'Anvers, daughter of Louis Cahen d'Anvers. She famously appears as a child alongside her sister in Renoir's 1881 portrait Pink and Blue, one of many commissioned by her father. They had one daughter, Audrey Dorothy Louise Townshend (born 1900) who married Count Baudouin de Borchgrave d'Altena. Belgian-American journalist Arnaud de Borchgrave (1926–2015) was Sir Charles Townshend's grandson.

His niece, Tiria Vere Ferrers Townshend (daughter of his brother Ernest Edwin Townshend), then aged 17, was a survivor of the May 29, 1914 sinking of the ocean liner RMS Empress of Ireland in the Saint Lawrence River which took the lives of 1,012 passengers and crew. She was one of only 41 women to survive (out of 310 on board). Her aunt, who accompanied her, was lost.

Sir Charles died in Paris, age 63. Lady Townshend died more than four decades later, aged 89.

Military offices
Preceded by Edward Dickson	GOC Home Counties Division; April–October 1912	Succeeded by James Young
Preceded by Julian Byng	GOC East Anglian Division; 1912–1913	Succeeded by Francis Inglefield
Parliament of the United Kingdom
Preceded by Charles Palmer	Member of Parliament for The Wrekin; 1920–1922	Succeeded by Howard Stransom Button
