= Independent Parliamentary Group =

British right-wing political organisation

The Independent Parliamentary Group was a right-wing political organisation in the United Kingdom. It was founded in 1920 by Horatio Bottomley, elected in the 1918 general election as an independent Member of Parliament.

In 1919, Bottomley founded the People's League. He hoped the League would become "a great Third Party" which would represent "the People" against organised labour and organised capital. The 4th Marquess of Salisbury was also initially involved in the League. According to Sir Oswald Mosley, he and Leslie Hore-Belisha were also active members.

In 1920, Bottomley complemented the League by forming the "Independent Parliamentary Group" with other MPs sympathetic to his ideas, while still using the People's League to stand George Makgill in the 1920 Leyton by-election.

Several Members of Parliament joined the group, including Bottomley, Cecil Beck, Christopher Lowther, Claude Lowther, Charles Frederick Palmer and Sir C. V. F. Townshend. It also sponsored several candidates; John Nicholson accepted its support, but after winning the 1921 Westminster Abbey by-election, did not join the group. Murray Sueter, who was co-sponsored by the group and by the Anti-Waste League, was elected in the 1921 Hertford by-election.

Later in 1921, a business venture of Bottomley's, the John Bull Victory Bond Club, was sunk by fraud and mismanagement. In the ensuing scandal, the group was disbanded, and the following year, Bottomley was expelled from Parliament.
