= Elsie Pidgeon =

Australian hospital matron (1879–1956)

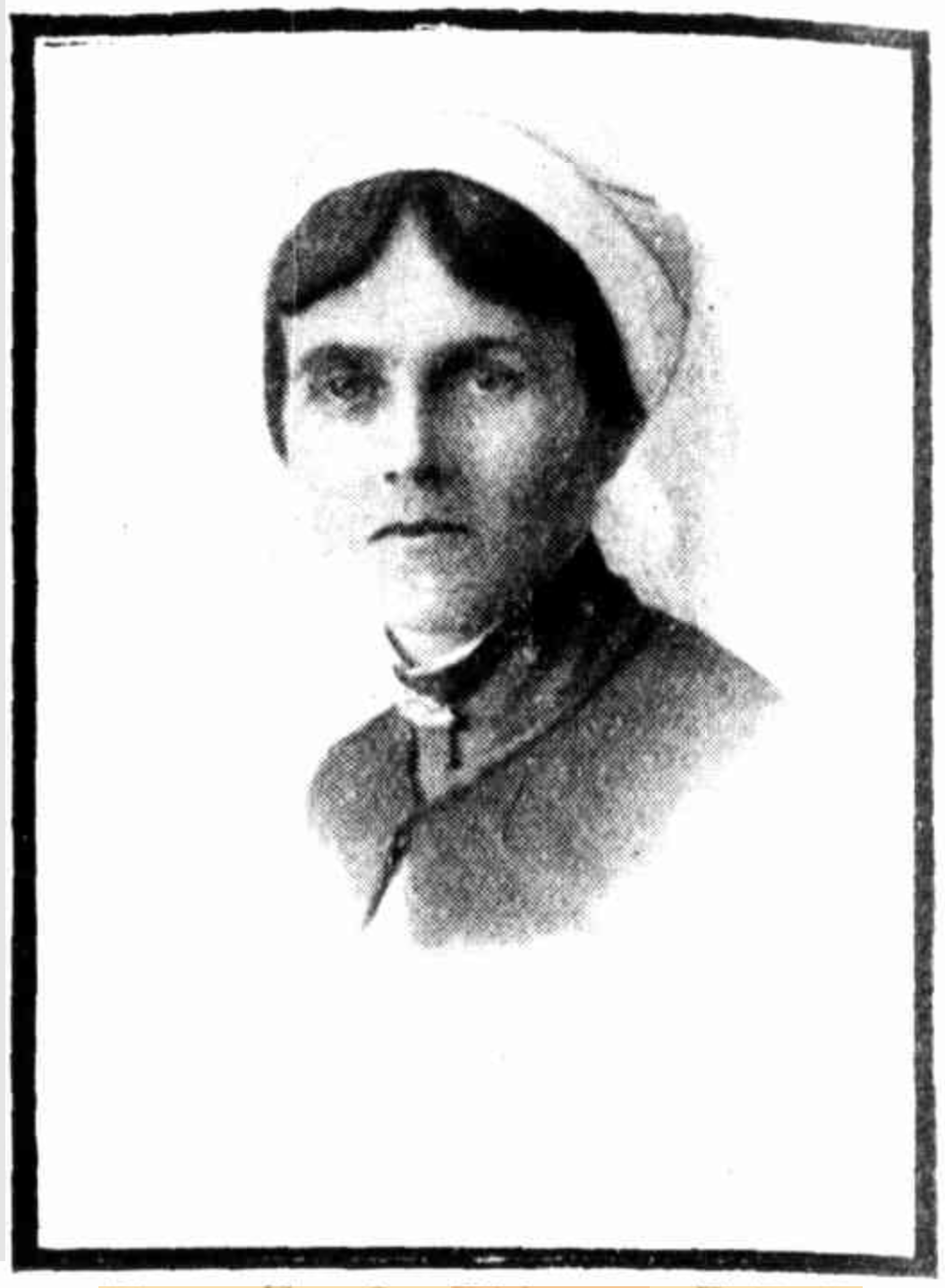
- Pidgeon in 1918
- Born: 28 September 1879; St Leonards, New South Wales, Australia
- Died: 4 July 1956 (aged 76); Sydney, New South Wales, Australia
- Military career
- Allegiance: Australia
- Branch: Australian Imperial Force
- Service years: 1915–1920
- Rank: Sister
- Unit: Australian Army Nursing Service
- Conflicts: First World War
- Awards: Associate Royal Red Cross; Florence Nightingale Medal
- Other work: Hospital matron, Sydney Hospital

Elsie Clare Pidgeon, ARRC (28 September 1879 – 4 July 1956) was an Australian army nurse and hospital matron. She was awarded the Associate Royal Red Cross in the First World War and the Florence Nightingale Medal in 1935.

== Early life and education ==
Pidgeon was born on 28 September 1879 in St Leonards, New South Wales. She was the eldest daughter of Emily Louisa (née Cobcroft) and shipping clerk Thomas Pidgeon. She joined Sydney Hospital in 1904 as a trainee and qualified as a nurse in 1908.

== Nursing career ==
Pidgeon's initial appointment after she qualified was as a head nurse at Sydney Hospital. She was subsequently promoted to charge sister in 1910.

Pidgeon enlisted in the Australian Imperial Force on 5 May 1915 and sailed for Egypt ten days later with No. 3 Australian General Hospital, led by Thomas Fiaschi. She saw service on Lemnos, in Egypt, France and England. She was the Associate Royal Red Cross in 1918 and presented with its ribbon by General Sir William Birdwood.

After returning to Australia in July 1919, Pidgeon resumed work at Sydney Hospital and in 1922 she was promoted to assistant matron. In 1935 she was awarded the Florence Nightingale Medal by the International Committee of the Red Cross. It was presented to her by Lady Isaacs, wife of the governor-general, Sir Isaac Isaacs, in her role of president of the Australian Red Cross.

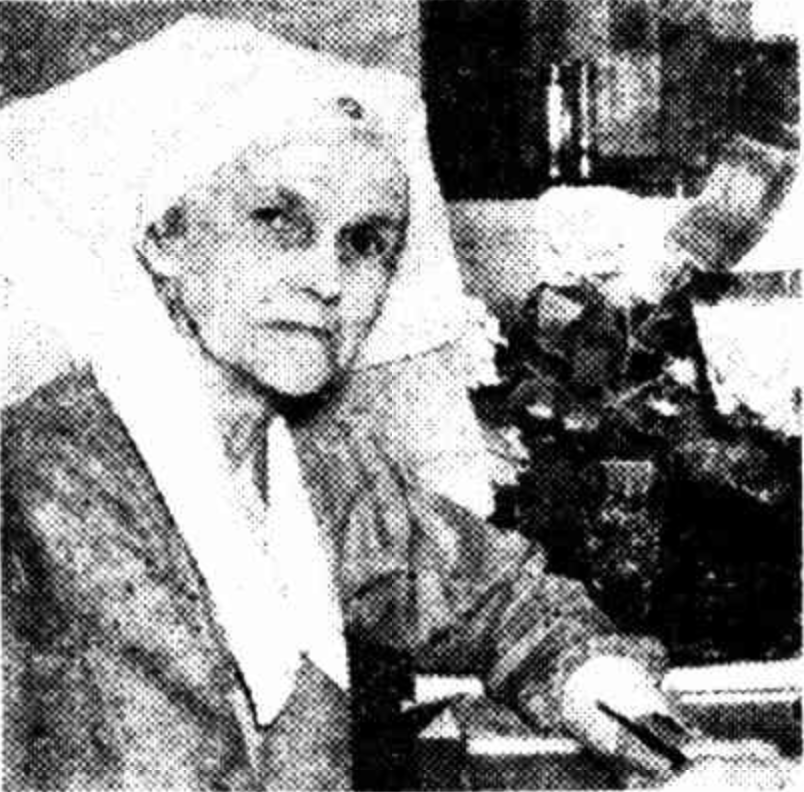
Pidgeon in 1944

Pidgeon was appointed matron of Sydney Hospital in October 1944, but made retrospective to October 1943 when she had effectively taken over from Adelaide Kellett, who subsequently retired. Pidgeon was appointed to the Nurses' Registration board in 1949. In 1952 she presided over the annual reunion of nurses trained at Sydney Hospital, a tradition stretching back to shortly after the First World War.

== Death and legacy ==
Pidgeon died in Sydney Hospital on 4 July 1956. A funeral service was held in the Congregational Church, Pitt Street. Pidgeon Place in the Canberra suburb of Chisholm, was named in her honour.
