= Ernest Tennant =

English merchant banker and industrialist (1887–1962)

Ernest Tennant OBE
- Born: 5 May 1887
- Died: 31 July 1962 (aged 75)
- Citizenship: British
- Occupations: Merchant banker and industrialist
- Movement: Anglo-German Fellowship
- Spouse(s): Eleonora Tennant; Irene Adelaide Gage
- Children: Vanessa Fiaschi Dalrymple Tennant; June Tennant; Julian William Fiaschi Tennant; Camilla Tennant
- Parent(s): William Augustus Tennant and Agnes Gairdner
- Relatives: Margot Asquith (cousin), William Yates (son-in-law)

Ernest William Dalrymple Tennant OBE (5 May 1887 – 31 July 1962) was an English merchant banker and industrialist. An advocate of closer links between the United Kingdom and Germany, he was a prominent voice for co-operation between the countries in the years before the Second World War. He was made an Officer of the Order of the British Empire in 1919.

== Early years ==
Tennant served in the First World War with the Intelligence Corps, rising to the rank of captain. After the war, he was made an Officer of the Order of the British Empire in 1919. A merchant banker by profession, he was highly successful and developed extensive business interests in Germany. He was associated with various financial institutions, including what is now called the Bank Leumi in Israel.

== Links to Germany ==
=== Early connections ===
A frequent visitor to Germany, Tennant hoped to encourage greater trade links with the UK. He was initially enthusiastic about Nazism and in 1933 his article "Herr Hitler and His Policy: March 1933" was published in Douglas Francis Jerrold's The English Review, a journal that was otherwise sceptical about the Nazis despite largely admiring Italian fascism. He wrote again for the journal in January 1935, claiming in his article "Herr Hitler's Constructive Policy" that many of the stories of Nazi excesses that appeared in the British press were exaggerations and part of "a smoke-screen of anti-Hitler propaganda". In order to encourage links, he led a trade delegation to Germany on 9 May 1934. On 20 September 1934, he met Adolf Hitler as part of a further delegation to Germany, along with Robert Vansittart and other industrialists. He also accompanied Paul Rykens and Montagu Norman on trips to Germany and was, along with Lord Rothermere, Esmond Harmsworth and George Ward Price (foreign correspondent of The Daily Mail), one of four guests of honour at a banquet thrown by Hitler on 19 December 1934.

During a trip to Germany in 1932, Tennant had met Joachim von Ribbentrop and the two men became close friends, with Tennant regularly staying at von Ribbentrop's home in the exclusive Dahlem district of Berlin. Through a friendship with J. C. C. Davidson, Tennant was able to arrange a meeting between von Ribbentrop and Lord President of the Council Stanley Baldwin in November 1934. Accounts of the meeting vary, with Tennant claiming that Baldwin liked von Ribbentrop but Davidson suggesting the opposite. Tennant attempted to use the meeting as a basis for a Baldwin visit to Germany but, after some consideration, he declined the invitation and sent his Parliamentary Private Secretary Geoffrey Lloyd in his stead, a decision that Hitler interpreted as a snub. Tennant was able to arrange another meeting between von Ribbentrop and Baldwin in February 1935 but this was an altogether frostier affair, with Tennant condemning Baldwin roundly for what he considered the future Prime Minister's lack of diplomacy.

=== Anglo-German Fellowship ===
Tennant dined with von Ribbentrop and several British businessmen at the Savoy Hotel on 26 November 1934 at which they decided to organise the pro-German interests on a more formal basis. The plans came to fruition in September 1935 with the establishment of the Anglo-German Fellowship (AGF), an organisation of leading political and business figures in the UK dedicated to the establishment of closer links with Germany. Tennant was appointed the first secretary of the new group. He was also a prominent financier of the AGF and following its formation he was recognised as the main driving force behind the group, which for a time enjoyed widespread influence in the higher echelons of British society. He was for a time close to Richard Meinertzhagen, having met him through his father and brother, both of whom were merchant banking colleagues of Tennant. Meinertzhagen was also a founder member of the AGF.

In 1934 the book The Man and The Hour - "Studies of Six Great Men of Our Time" was published, edited by Arthur Bryant. Tennant contributed the essay on Hitler.

Tennant was one of a group of prominent Britons who attended the Nuremberg rally in 1935. Unity Mitford, a virulent supporter of the Nazi movement, was also among those who travelled there. Tennant was not, however, a convinced Nazi and as early as 1935 had acknowledged that Nazi antisemitism was a source of embarrassment to those in the UK advocating closer links to Germany. He added that he intended not to listen to any specifically anti-Jewish speeches delivered at the rallies. Tennant also helped to facilitate David Lloyd George's visit to Germany the same year, with the former Prime Minister subsequently writing a favourable tribute to Hitler after the visit.

=== Towards war ===
Tennant initially accepted the German justification for their activities in central Europe - that they were merely safeguarding German minority populations - and wrote to The Times in defence of the march into the Rhineland in 1936. He was still keen to stress however that he was not a Nazi, and rejected membership of the Link when it was established in 1937, reasoning that the group was too pro-Nazi. Having grown very close to the historian Philip Conwell-Evans - himself a leading AGF member - the two men became increasingly uneasy about Nazi Germany, particularly following the Anschluss. By 1938, he had grown disillusioned with Hitler and privately began to characterise German actions as simply expansionism.

Tennant was one of a number of leading pro-German Britons sent to Germany clandestinely with the approval of the British government in 1939 in an attempt to avoid war by conversing with Nazis considered sympathetic to the UK. To this end he met von Ribbentrop at his castle near Salzburg in July, with the Nazi ambassador telling Tennant that he considered the UK's Polish guarantee as a provocative gesture to Germany. At the meeting (which had the unofficial approval of Prime Minister Neville Chamberlain) von Ribbentrop told Tennant that if the British wanted war with the Nazis then "Germany is ready".

Following the war Tennant was subpoenaed to the Nuremberg trials to testify about von Ribbentrop.

== Personal life ==
Tennant was the son of William Augustus Tennant and Agnes Gairdner and lived at Orford House, a country house that was already in his family. He was a cousin of Margot Asquith. He married Eleonora Fiaschi on 11 April 1912 and the couple had four children together before divorcing. On 15 February 1950 he remarried, this time to Irene Adelaide Gage, the daughter of Henry Gage, 5th Viscount Gage. His children were:

- Vanessa Fiaschi Dalrymple Tennant (23 August 1919 – 1995)
- June Tennant (born 11 November 1921)
- Julian William Fiaschi Tennant (1 August 1924 – 1995)
- Camilla Tennant (born 22 January 1930); later wife of the Anglo-Australian politician William Yates.
