= Orford House =

House in Ugley, Essex, England

Coordinates: 51.922°N 0.205°E

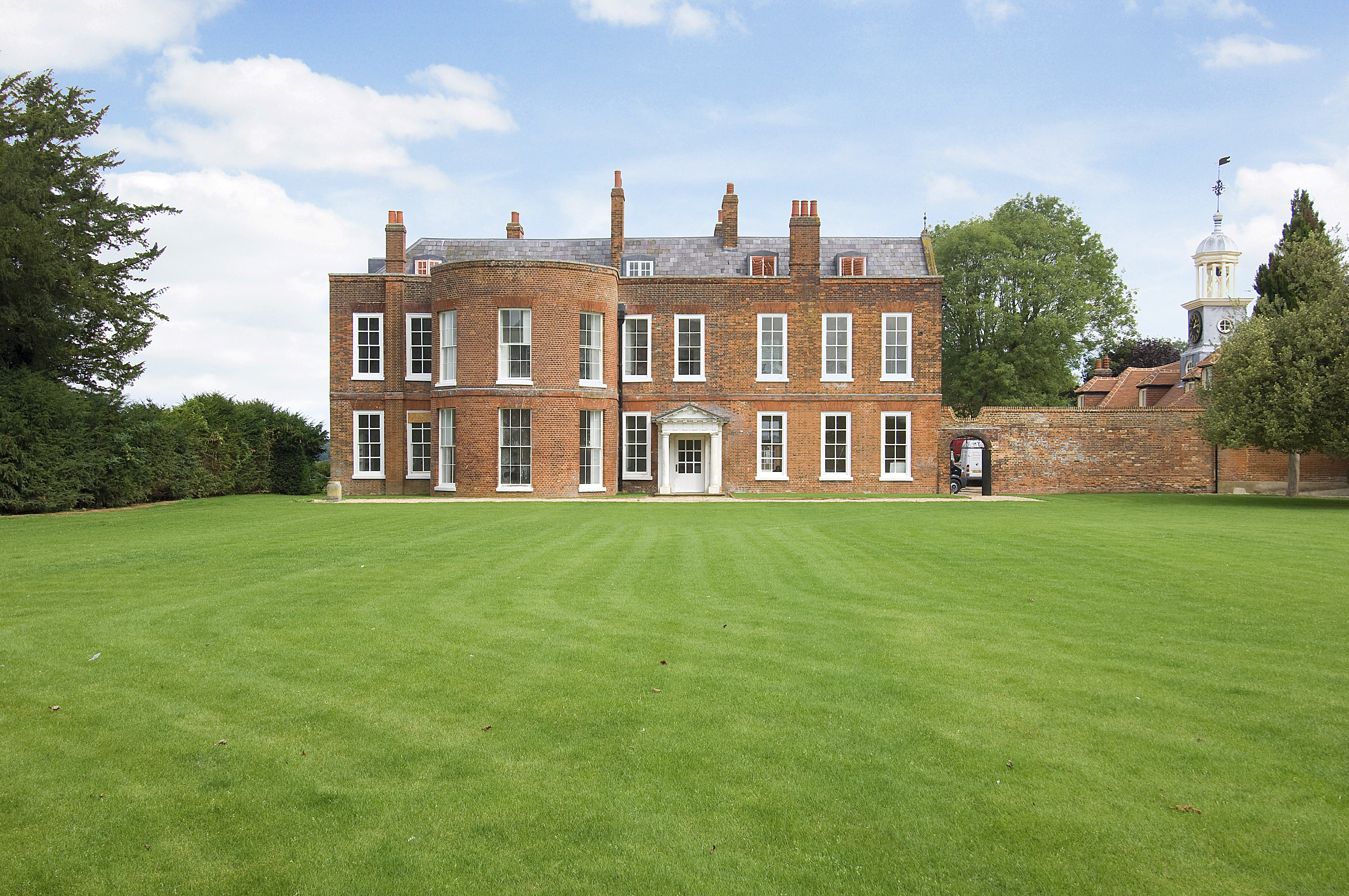
Orford House, 2009

Orford House is a country house in the small medieval hamlet of Ugley, Essex, England.

== History ==
The house was built for Edward Russell, who went on to be First Lord of the Admiralty, in around 1700. It was enlarged by Isaac Whittington MP in around 1750 and then passed to Colonel Chamberlayne by the late 1840s. It remained in the ownership of the Chamberlayne family and then in the early 20th century it came into the ownership of the Tennant family. It was for a time the marital home of Ernest and Eleonora Tennant. After the Second World War it was owned by a Mr and Mrs Butterworth until it was bought by the Home Farm Trust in 1983. Since then it has been a care home for people with learning disabilities.

The house is a Grade II* listed building.
