= Eleonora Tennant =

- Born: Eleonora Elisa Fiaschi; 19 December 1893; Sydney, New South Wales, Australia
- Died: 11 September 1963 (aged 69); Kettering, Northamptonshire, England
- Notable work: Spanish Journey: Personal Experiences of the Civil War
- Political party: Conservative; Democratic Labor
- Movement: Friends of National Spain; Never Again Association; Face the Facts Association
- Spouse: Ernest Tennant (m. 1911; div. 1948)
- Children: Vanessa Fiaschi Dalrymple Tennant; June Tennant; Julian William Fiaschi Tennant; Camilla Tennant
- Parents: Thomas Fiaschi (father); Catherine Ann Fisher (mother)
- Relatives: William Yates (son-in-law)

Eleonora Elisa Fiaschi Tennant (19 December 1893 – 11 September 1963) was an Australian political activist best known for her involvement with far-right politics in England. She and her husband Ernest Tennant had links with Nazi Germany and she was an outspoken anti-Semite. She stood for the House of Commons on three occasions, as a Conservative in 1931 and 1935, and as an Independent Conservative in 1945. She returned to Australia in 1952 and was a Democratic Labor candidate for the Senate in 1961.

== Early life ==
Tennant was born in Sydney to Italian-Australian military surgeon Thomas Fiaschi and his first wife Catherine Ann (née Reynolds), who was born in Ireland and was a former nun. she was sent to school in England. In 1911, while in Australia, she met Ernest Tennant, a British merchant banker who did a lot of business with Germany. They married soon afterwards, while she was still seventeen, and settled in the UK, living at the Tennant family home of Orford House. They had four children together The two came to know Joachim von Ribbentrop and were supportive of Nazism. Ernest Tennant was a leading figure in the Anglo-German Fellowship, an organisation he helped to establish in 1935 which advocated closer relations between the UK and Nazi Germany.

== Right-wing politics ==
At the 1931 general election, Tennant stood as the Conservative Party candidate for Silvertown, a safe Labour Party seat in the East End of London. Her candidacy was sponsored by Lucy, Lady Houston, and came despite the opposition of Ernest. In a year which generally saw a landslide victory for the Conservatives, Tennant took 22.2% of the vote. Undeterred, she set up an office in the constituency with the aim of encouraging local employers to take on more staff, and forcing the local council to deal with some housing issues. She stood again at the 1935 general election, her vote share falling to 19.0%.

During the Spanish Civil War, Tennant visited areas under Nationalist control, near the Portuguese border. She was driven around by a Falangist activist, and came to the conclusion that what she described as the "Glorious Uprising" was an unqualified success, the war being entirely the fault of communists, and that a dictatorship was necessary to save the country. Although she was only in the country for ten days, on her return to the UK, she published Spanish Journey: Personal Experiences of the Civil War. At home she was a leading figure in Friends of National Spain, a group formed by Lord Phillimore in 1937 to win the support of leading members of the political elite and nobility for Francisco Franco, and in this group was close to the far-right academic Charles Saroléa who, like Tennant, was based in Scotland at the time.

Tennant maintained contact with many far-right activists during World War II, and met regularly with Jeffrey Hamm, during which they discussed their support for anti-Semitism. Near the end of the war, Tennant came to lead two groups, the "Never Again Association" and the "Face the Facts Association", both extreme nationalist groups. Though neither attracted a significant membership, she used them to promote various views, mostly notably her opposition to bread rationing. She stood in Putney at the 1945 United Kingdom general election as an independent Conservative. Opposing an official Conservative and three other candidates, she took only 144 votes and came bottom of the poll.

By this point Tennant had become outspoken in her anti-Semitism, stating that she was prepared to "go all out against the Jew". To this end she sought to work with Sylvia Gosse and Margaret Crabtree, two residents of Belsize Park who in October 1945 organised an "anti-alien" petition against plans to house Jewish refugees in the Metropolitan Borough of Hampstead. The petition gained some press support and had the backing of Conservative MPs Charles Challen and Waldron Smithers as well as Ernest Benn and the Society for Individual Freedom. Tennant attempted to link Hamm in with this burgeoning movement and the pair held a meeting in Belsize Park on 21 November 1945 in an attempt to link Hamm with them. Before the meeting Hamm removed a portrait of Oswald Mosley for fear of scaring off the Conservative-linked Tennant although in the end he was impressed by the strength of her commitment to anti-Semitism. The initiative was largely unsuccessful however as Hamm's methods of provocative street politics and the heckling of leftist meetings were far removed from the high society circles in which the likes of Gosse and Crabtree moved.

== Later years ==
In 1948 Tennant's husband brought a divorce petition on the grounds of desertion. She contested the petition on the grounds that she "objected to living with [him] because of his Nazi sympathies". He remarried in 1950. In 1952 she moved to Winkleigh, Tasmania, where she ran a farm. She sold this on after a few years and bought a series of farms in this manner, the last being one she newly established on the Diddleum Plains. She again became politically active, and stood as a Democratic Labor Party candidate for the Senate in the 1961 Australian federal election, but took only 476 votes. She began developing heart problems, and returned to live with family in England, dying in Kettering in 1963.
