= Thomas Fiaschi =

Surgeon (1853–1927)

Colonel Thomas Fiaschi
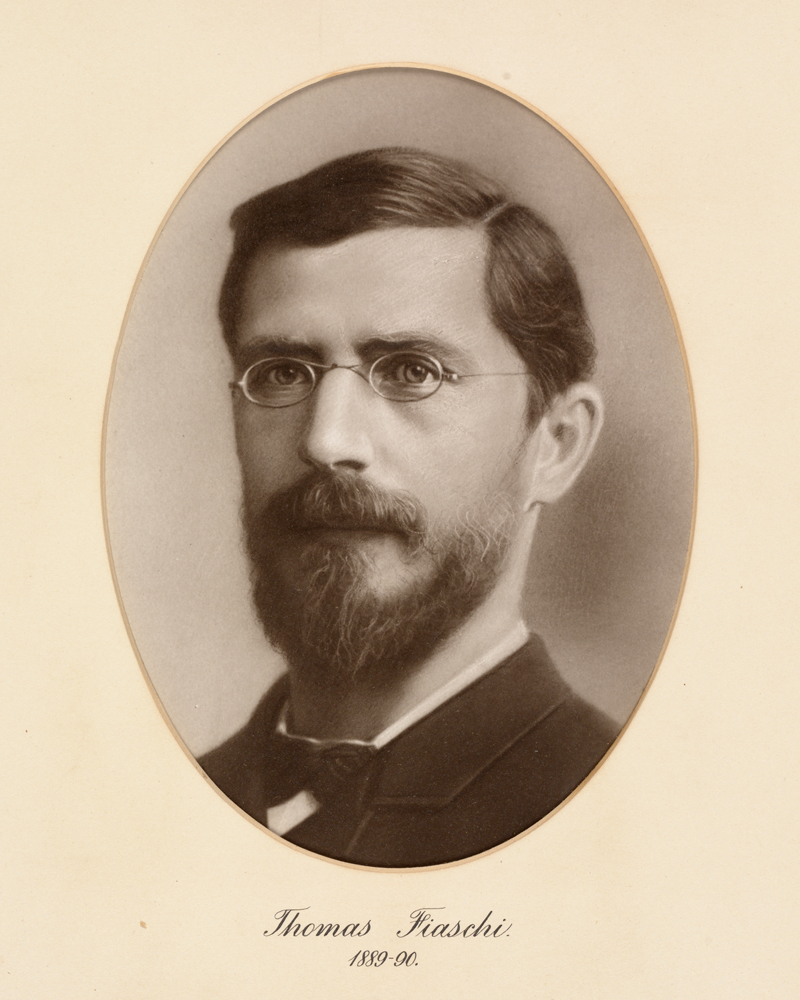
- Fiaschi c. 1890
- Born: 31 May 1853; Florence, Italy
- Died: 17 April 1926 (aged 72); Darling Point, New South Wales, Australia
- Education: University of Florence; University of Pisa
- Spouse(s): Catherine Reynolds (m. 1876; died 1913) Amy Curtis (m. 1914)
- Relatives: Eleonora Tennant (daughter)

Thomas Henry Fiaschi (Italian: Tommaso Enrico Fiaschi; 31 May 1853 – 17 April 1927) was an Italian-Australian surgeon. He served with both Italian and Australian armed forces, seeing active service as a military surgeon in the First Italo-Ethiopian War, the Second Boer War, and World War I.

== Early life ==
Fiaschi was born on 31 May 1853 in Florence, Italy, then within the Grand Duchy of Tuscany. He was the son of Clarissa (née Fisher) and Lodovico Fiaschi. His father was a mathematics professor at the University of Florence, while his mother was an Englishwoman who had worked as a tutor to members of the Corsini family.

== Medical career ==
Fiaschi received his initial medical training at the University of Florence. He emigrated to Australia at the age of 21, initially spending time at the Palmer River Goldfields in the colony of Queensland. He subsequently settled in New South Wales where he was a house surgeon at St Vincent's Hospital, Sydney. He returned to Italy to undertake further training in Florence and at the University of Pisa, graduating M.D., Ch.D. in 1877.

After two years working in Italy and London, Fiaschi returned to Australia in 1879 and established a medical practice in Windsor, New South Wales. He moved back to Sydney in 1883 and became active in the newly created New South Wales branch of the British Medical Association (BMA), serving a term as president from 1889 to 1890. His association with Sydney Hospital began with his appointment as an honorary surgeon in 1890. He was later appointed chairman of the board of medical studies at 1909 and honorary consulting surgeon in 1911.

Fiaschi applied the antiseptic surgery principles of Joseph Lister and translated Italian surgeon Edoardo Bassini's works on hernia repair into English. He was also a president of the Australasian Trained Nurses' Association. As a surgeon he did "pioneering work" in exophthalmic goitre (Graves disease), hydatid disease, and orthopedic surgery.

== Military service ==
In 1891, Fiaschi joined the New South Wales Lancers, a reserve colonial unit, as an honorary surgeon captain. He volunteered for the Italian Army in 1896 following the Italian invasion of Abyssinia. In an interview with The Sydney Morning Herald he stated he had been influenced to enlist by the Italian defeat at the Battle of Adwa and his support for the principles of Young Italy, believing that it would be "dishonorable to allow the slaughtered sons of Italy to go unrevenged". Fiaschi was made a knight of the Order of Saints Maurice and Lazarus and officer of the Order of the Crown of Italy for his services in the war. He published an article on the treatment of Italian prisoners-of-war in the British Medical Journal.

During the Second Boer War, Fiaschi saw active service in South Africa as commandant of the New South Wales 1st Field Hospital and was senior medical officer to Edward Hutton's 1st Mounted Infantry Brigade, with the rank of major. He was awarded the Distinguished Service Order and was promoted to lieutenant-colonel on his return. He was subsequently honorary surgeon to the Governor-General of Australia from 1902 to 1909.

Fiaschi commanded the 3rd Australian General Hospital in Lemnos during the Gallipoli campaign of World War I. He was invalided to England in November 1915 suffering from beriberi. After his recovery he resigned his Australian commission to rejoin the Italian Army, based at a military hospital in Schio on the Italian Front. He returned to Australia in 1917 and joined the Australian Army Medical Corps Reserve with the rank of colonel, retiring in 1921 with the honorary rank of brigadier-general.

== Personal life ==
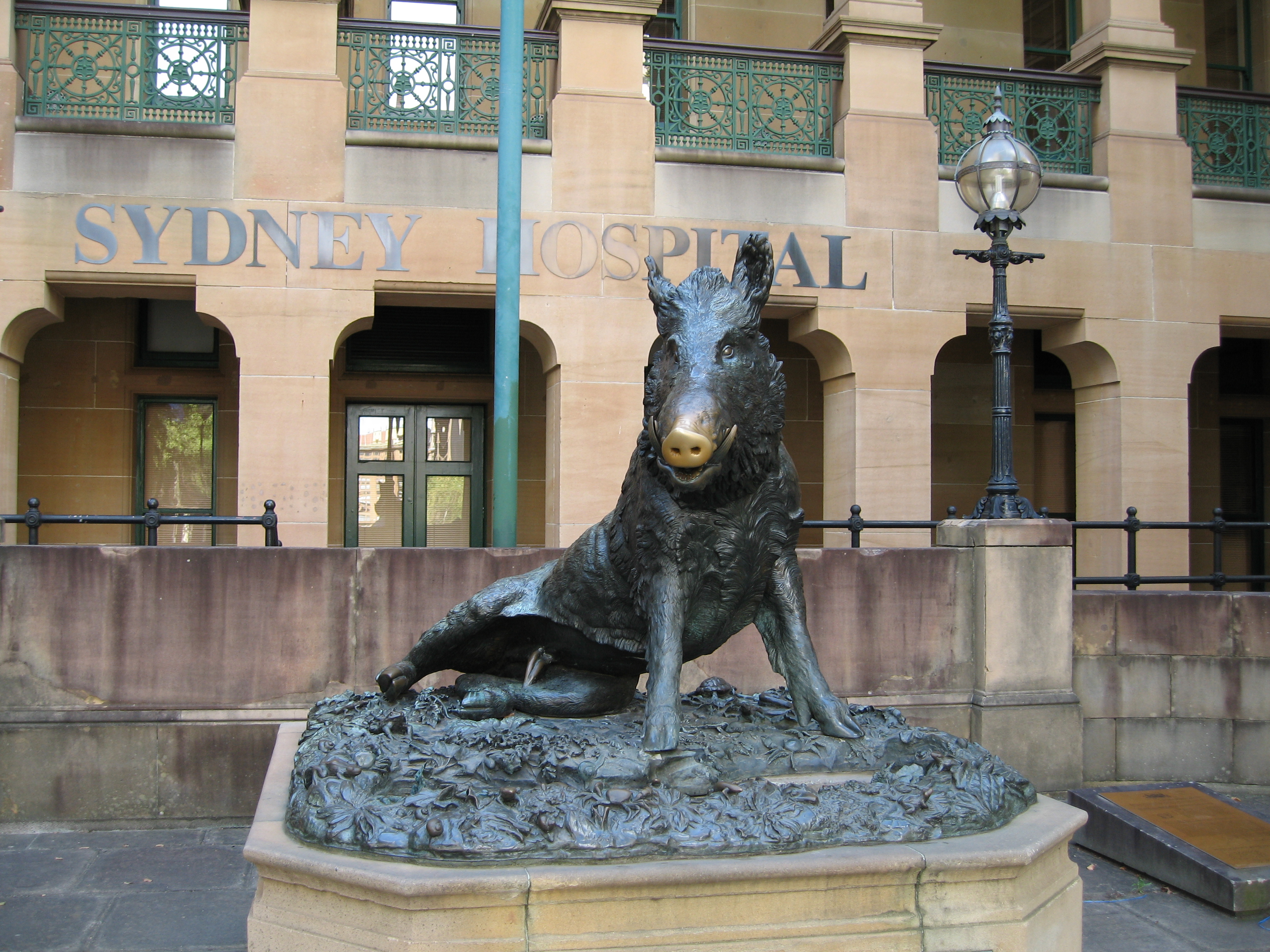
Copy of Florence's Porcellino statue, donated to Sydney Hospital by his daughter in 1968 in Fiaschi's honour

In 1876, Fiaschi married Catherine Ann Reynolds, a nurse and former nun with whom he had worked at St Vincent's Hospital. The couple had three sons and two daughters, with his sons Piero and Carlo following him into the medical profession. His daughters Eleonora Tennant and Clarissa Torrigianni settled overseas. Fiaschi was widowed in 1913 and in 1914 remarried to Amy Curtis, another nurse, with whom he had another two daughters.

Fiaschi died of bronchopneumonia on 17 April 1927 at Darling Point, New South Wales. He was buried in the Anglican section of Waverley Cemetery.

Outside of medicine, Fiaschi was a viticulturist and founded the Tizzana winery on the Hawkesbury River. He served as president of the Australian Wine Producers' Association of New South Wales from 1902 to 1927 and was a councillor of the Royal Agricultural Society of New South Wales.

In 1968, Fiaschi's daughter Clarissa donated a replica of Florence's Porcellino statue to the City of Sydney in honour of her father. It was installed outside of Sydney Hospital.
