= Adelaide Kellett =

Australian hospital matron (1873–1945)

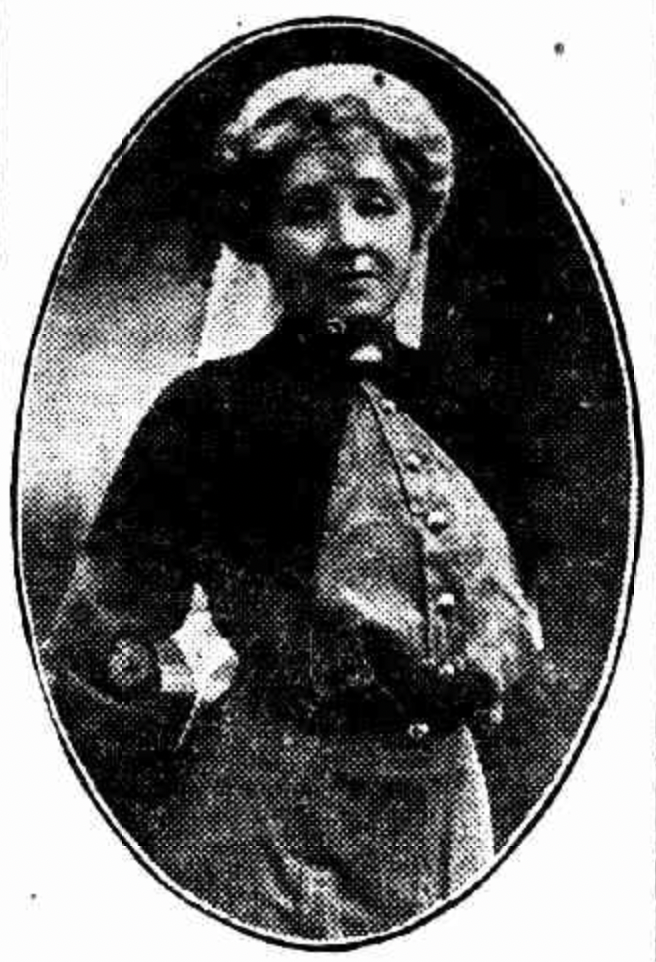
- Kellett in 1921
- Born: 1 September 1873; Raglan, New South Wales, Australia
- Died: 12 April 1945 (aged 71); Waverley, New South Wales, Australia
- Military career
- Allegiance: Australia
- Branch: Australian Army
- Service years: 1907–1929
- Rank: Principal Matron
- Unit: Australian Army Nursing Service
- Conflicts: First World War
- Awards: Commander of the Order of the British Empire; Royal Red Cross; Mentioned in Despatches (2); Florence Nightingale Medal

Adelaide Maud Kellett, CBE, RRC (1 September 1873 – 12 April 1945) was an Australian army nurse and hospital matron. She served with the Australian Army Nursing Service in the First World War and was matron of Sydney Hospital from 1921 to 1944.

== Early life and training ==
Adelaide Maud Kellett was born in Raglan, New South Wales, on 1 September 1873. Her parents were Sarah (née McClintock) and postal worker Charles Henry Kellett. She undertook her nursing training at Sydney Hospital from January 1898 to September 1901.

== Nursing career ==
Kellett joined the Australian Army Nursing Service (AANS) in 1907. She was appointed deputy to matron Rose Ann Creal at Sydney Hospital in October 1910.

Following the outbreak of the First World War, Kellett joined the Australian Imperial Force. She embarked on the Euripides on 19 October 1914 for Egypt, where she spent ten months at No. 2 Australian General Hospital in Cairo and on board Gascon during the evacuation from Gallipoli. She next served as matron of the Choubrah Military Infectious Hospital in Egypt for six months from February 1916. She was transferred to England to open No. 2 Australian Auxiliary Hospital at Southall in August 1916, working with amputees. In July 1917, she was posted to Hardelot in France where she ran the 2400-bed 25th British General Hospital until its closure in March 1919. Back in England, Kellett interviewed 128 AANS nurses for the medical history war records of the Australian Imperial Force.

On her return to Australia, Kellett was selected for the role of matron of Sydney Hospital following the death of Rose Creal in 1921, and remained there until her retirement in 1944. She served on the Nurses' Registration Board of New South Wales from 1 March 1934 until her resignation in March 1943.

== Awards and recognition ==
Kellett was awarded the Royal Red Cross (first class) on 23 February 1917. She was mentioned in despatches in 1916 and 1919 and was appointed a Commander of the Order of the British Empire on 3 June 1919. In 1937, she was awarded the Florence Nightingale Medal, the third Australian nurse to be so honoured.

== Death and legacy ==
Kellett died in the War Memorial Hospital at Waverley, New South Wales, on 12 April 1945. Her funeral was held at St James' Church, Sydney, followed by cremation at the Northern Suburbs Crematorium.

The Kellett Memorial Prize for the nurse receiving the highest marks for general nursing in final examinations was established by the Australasian Trained Nurses' Association in her honour.
