= Porcellino =

Bronze fountain of a boar in Florence, Italy

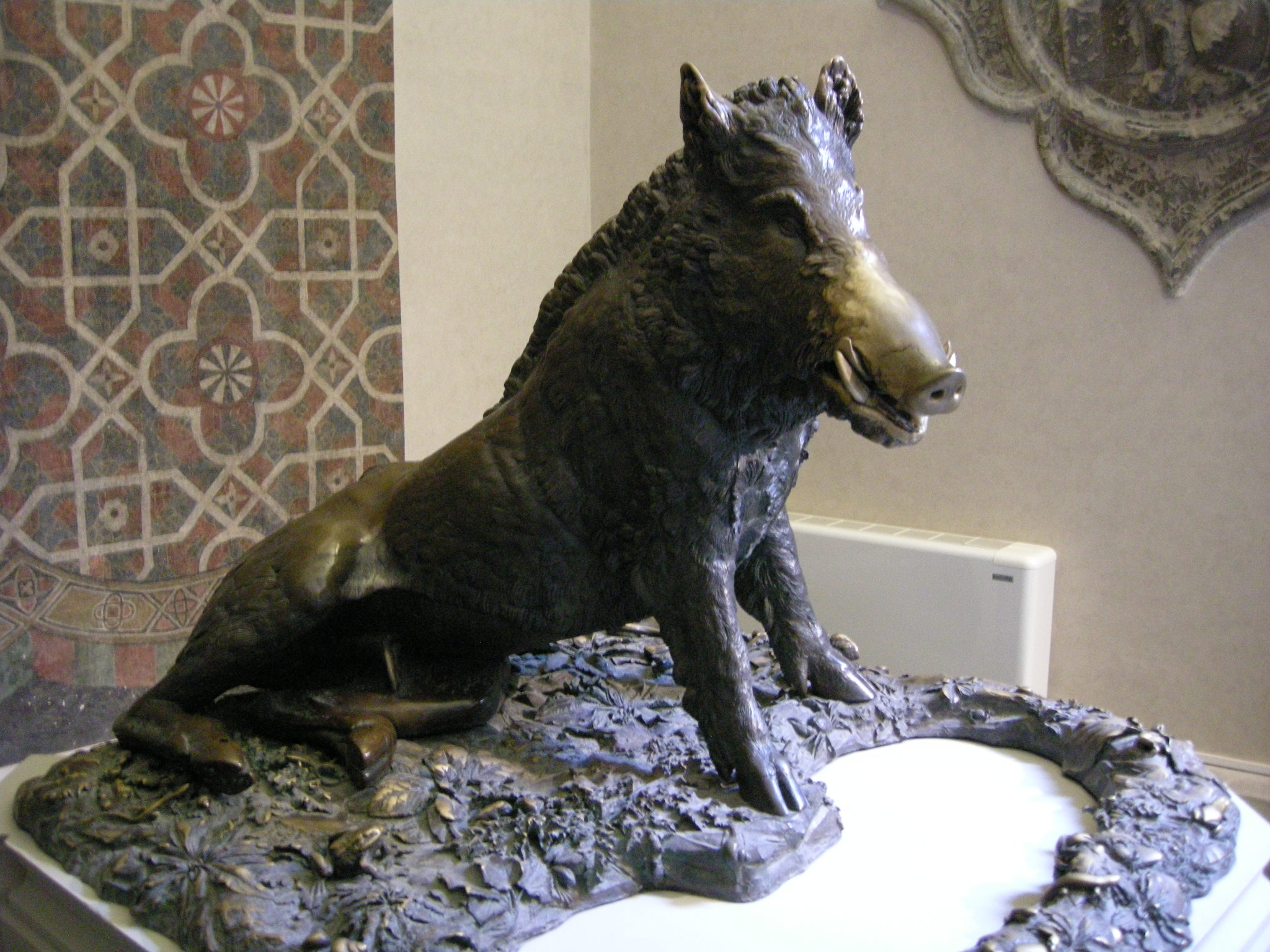
Pietro Tacca's bronze Porcellino (Museo Bardini)

The Porcellino (transl. "Piglet") is the local Florentine nickname for the bronze fountain of a boar. The fountain figure was sculpted and cast by Baroque master Pietro Tacca (1577–1640) shortly before 1634, following a marble Italian copy of a Hellenistic marble original, at the time in the Grand Ducal collections and today on display in the classical section of the Uffizi Museum. The original, which was found in Rome and moved to Florence in the mid-16th century by the Medici, was associated from the time of its rediscovery with the Calydonian Boar of Greek myth.

Tacca's bronze, which has eclipsed the Roman marble that served as model, was originally intended for the Boboli Garden in Florence, then moved to the Loggia del Mercato Nuovo; the fountain was placed originally facing east, in via Calimala, in front of the pharmacy that by association gained the name Farmacia del Cinghiale (Italian for "Boar"). To gain more space for market traffic it was later moved to the side facing south, where it still stands as one of the most popular features for tourists. The present statue is a modern copy, cast in 1998 by Ferdinando Marinelli Artistic Foundry and replaced in 2008, while Tacca's bronze is sheltered in the new Museo Stefano Bardini in Palazzo Mozzi.

Visitors to the Porcellino put a coin into the boar's gaping jaws, with the intent to let it fall through the underlying grating for good luck, and they rub the boar's snout to ensure a return to Florence, a tradition that the Scottish literary traveller Tobias Smollett already noted in 1766, which has kept the snout in a state of polished sheen while the rest of the boar's body has patinated to a dull brownish-green.

== Copies ==
Copies of the sculpture can be found around the world. Some of the locations are:

=== Australia ===
- Sydney Hospital, Sydney, New South Wales

=== Belgium ===
- Royal Greenhouses of Laeken, Brussels
- Place de Bastogne, Koekelberg, Brussels
- Enghien Park, Enghien
- Antwerp Zoo

=== Canada ===
- Butchart Gardens, Victoria, British Columbia
- Modern Languages building, University of Waterloo, Waterloo, Ontario
- Art Gallery of Nova Scotia, Halifax, Nova Scotia

=== Denmark ===
- Brotorvet, Holstebro

=== France ===
- Musée du Louvre, Paris
- Place Richelme, Aix-en-Provence

=== Germany ===
- Sitzender Keiler (recreation by Martin Mayer) in the Borstei and in front of the German Hunting and Fishing Museum, Munich

=== Italy ===
- Rispescia, Grosseto, Tuscany
- Loggia del Mercato Nuovo, Florence

=== Japan ===
- Tokyo, Nihonbashi District, Pigeon Corporation Headquarters
- Fuji City, Shizuoka Prefecture
- Uroko no Ie, Kitano Ijinkan, Kobe, Hyogo Prefecture

=== Norway ===
- Slemdal skole, Oslo

=== Spain ===
- Parque de El Capricho, Madrid

=== Sweden ===
- Lejonet och svinet, Stockholm

=== United Kingdom ===
- Derby Arboretum, Derby, England
- Chatsworth House, Derbyshire, England
- Leweston School, Dorset, England
- Castle Howard, North Yorkshire
- St Mary's College, Durham, Durham, England
- Kimmerghame House, Scottish Borders, Scotland
- Osborne House, Isle of Wight, England

=== United States ===
- Arkansas
  - University of Arkansas campus, Fayetteville
- California
  - Eberle Winery, Paso Robles.
  - Viansa Winery, Sonoma
- Colorado
  - Museum of Outdoor Arts, Englewood
- Connecticut
  - Choate Rosemary Hall, Wallingford
- Delaware
  - Delaware Museum of Natural History, Wilmington
- Georgia
  - Armstrong Kessler Mansion, 447 Bull Street, Savannah
- Hawaii
  - Honolulu, private collection
- Illinois,
  - Riverview Inn & Suites, on the Rock River in Rockford
- Kansas
  - The Villages Shopping Center, Prairie Village
- Kentucky
  - Louisville, private collection
- Louisiana
  - R. W. Norton Art Gallery, Shreveport
- Missouri
  - Country Club Plaza, N.W. Corner of 47th Street and Wornall Road, Kansas City
- Nevada
  - Main Street Station Casino Brewery Hotel – at casino bar, Las Vegas
- New York
  - Sutton Park
  - The Great Escape & Splashwater Kingdom amusement park at Queensbury
- North Carolina
  - Mar Boar Restaurant, Wallace
- Pennsylvania
  - Former Strawbridge & Clothier store, 801 Market Street, Philadelphia
- South Carolina
  - Poinsett Plaza, Greenville
  - Armstrong House, Savannah, Georgia
- Texas
  - Plaza Skillman Shopping Center, Dallas
  - Dallas Zoo, Dallas
  - Rice Village, Houston
- Vermont
  - Lyndon Center
- Virginia
  - Stone Tower Winery, Leesburg, Virginia

== In popular culture ==
The sculpture appears in literature as well as onscreen.

=== In literature ===
The Porcellino figures in Hans Christian Andersen's "The Bronze Hog" in A Poet's Bazaar. A plaque nearby explains the relationship between this boar and the story.

=== In film ===
Il Porcellino appears in the 2001 film Hannibal when Chief Inspector Rinaldo Pazzi (Giancarlo Giannini) cleans his hands in the fountain.

The statue is also seen briefly in Harry Potter and the Chamber of Secrets (2002) as Harry Potter and Ron Weasley climb the Hogwarts staircase after crashing into the Whomping Willow, and again on the same staircase during the flashback scene where Tom Riddle speaks to Albus Dumbledore. It also appears in Harry Potter and the Deathly Hallows –Part 2 (2011) in the Room of Requirement.

In the 1962 film Light in the Piazza, Fabrizio (George Hamilton) pats the boar's snout for luck after buying flowers.

== Gallery ==
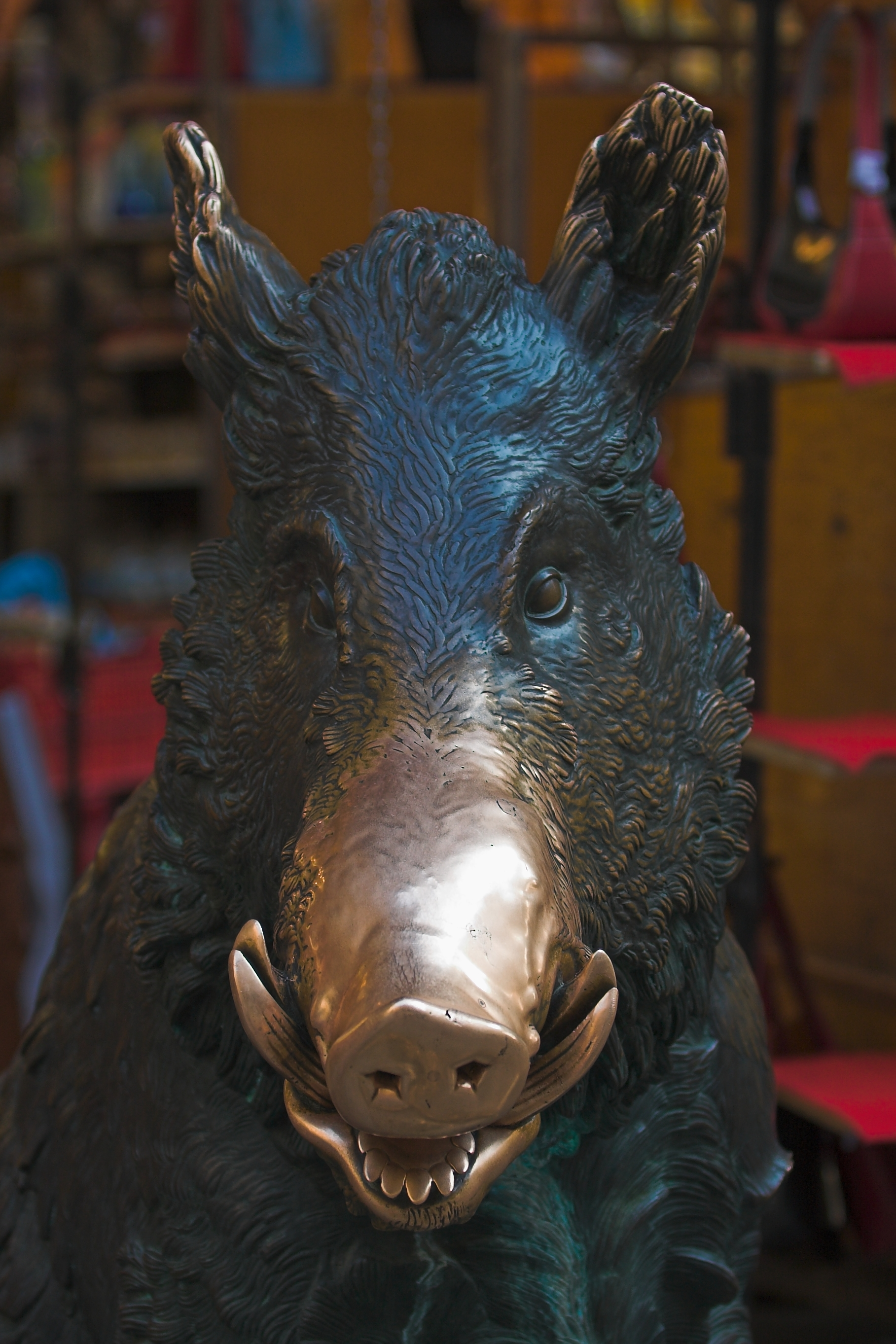
Well-worn snout of Il Porcellino in the Mercato Nuovo, Florence, Italy

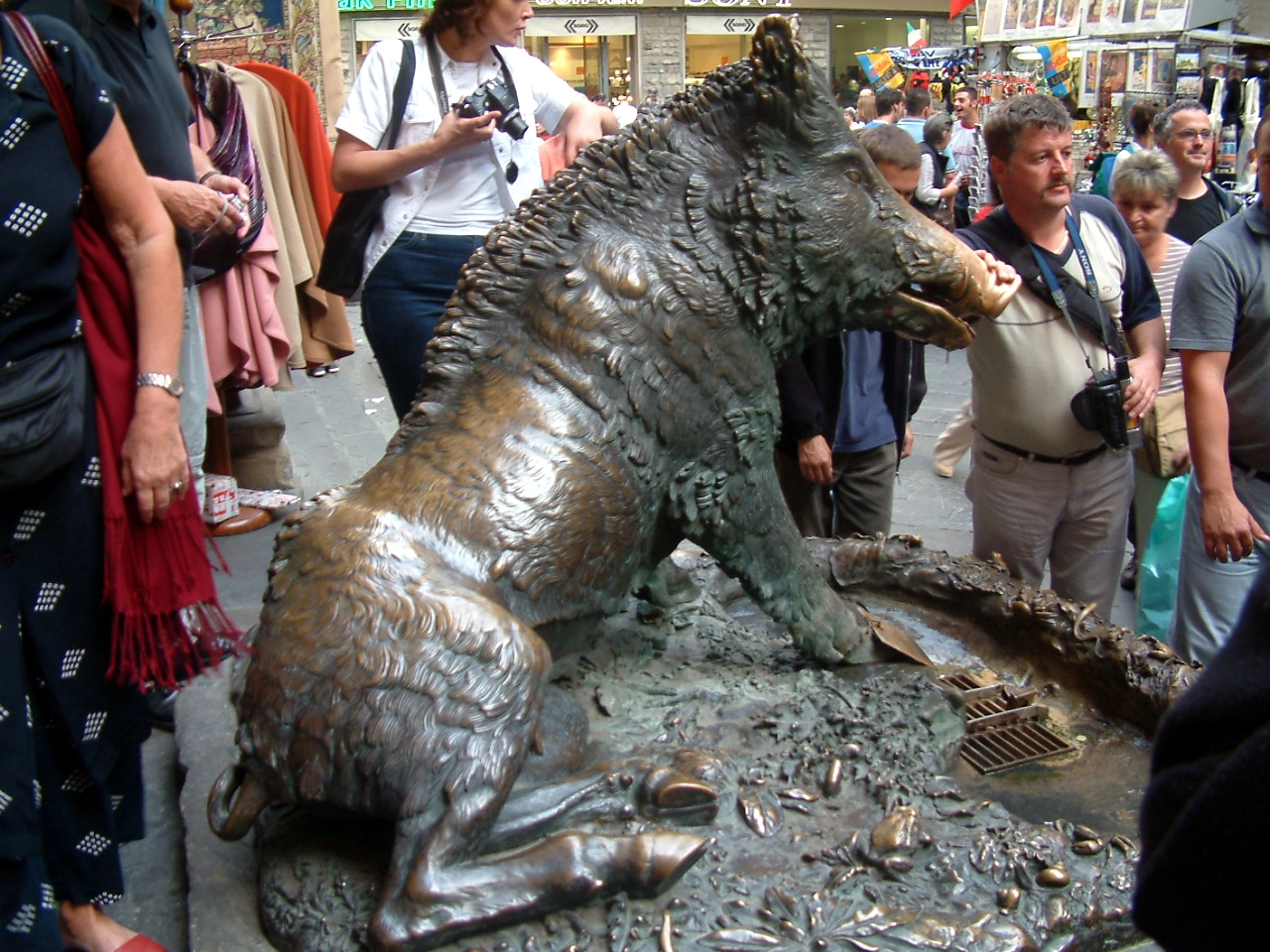
Il Porcellino in Florence

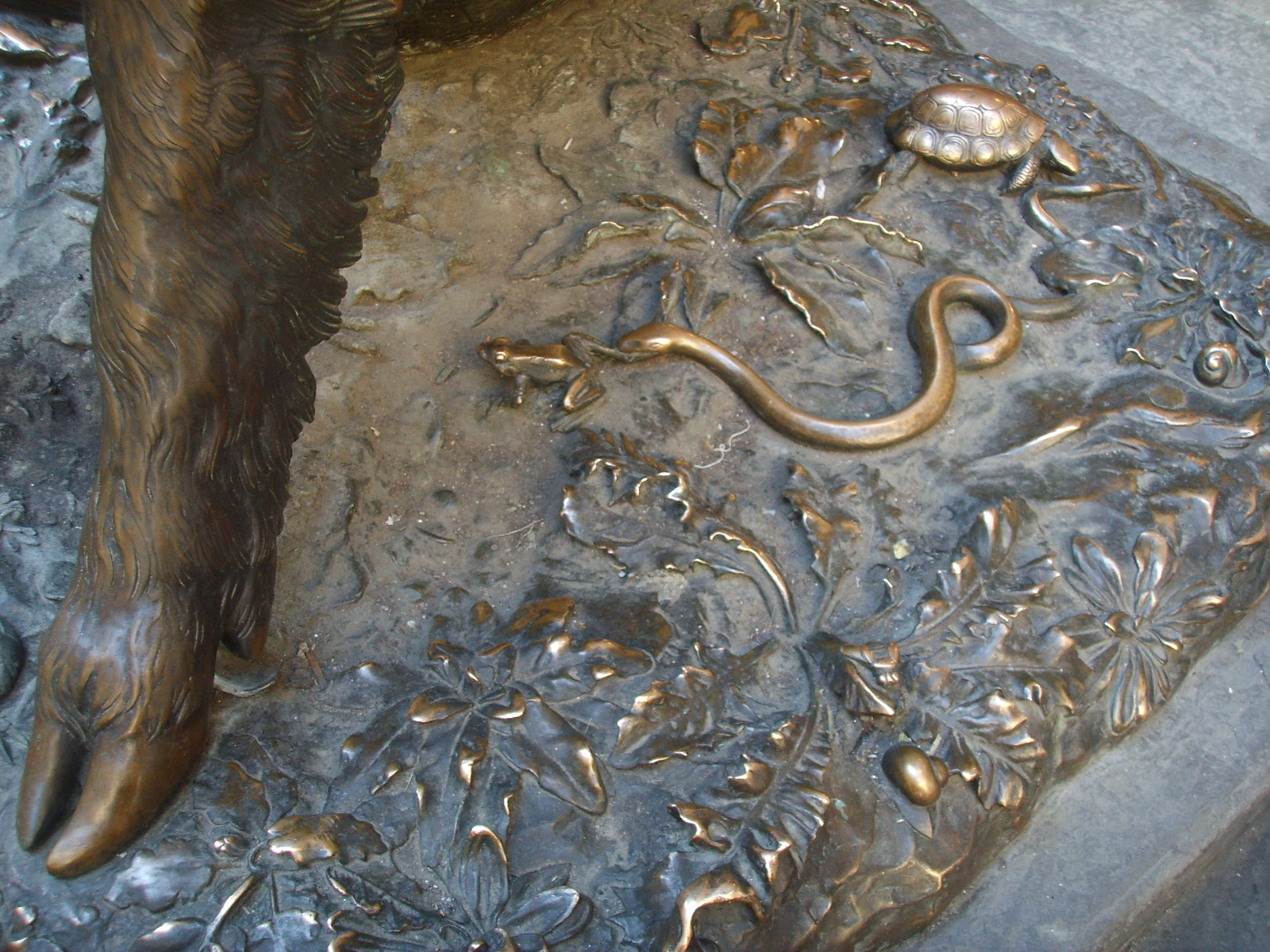
Detail on the base

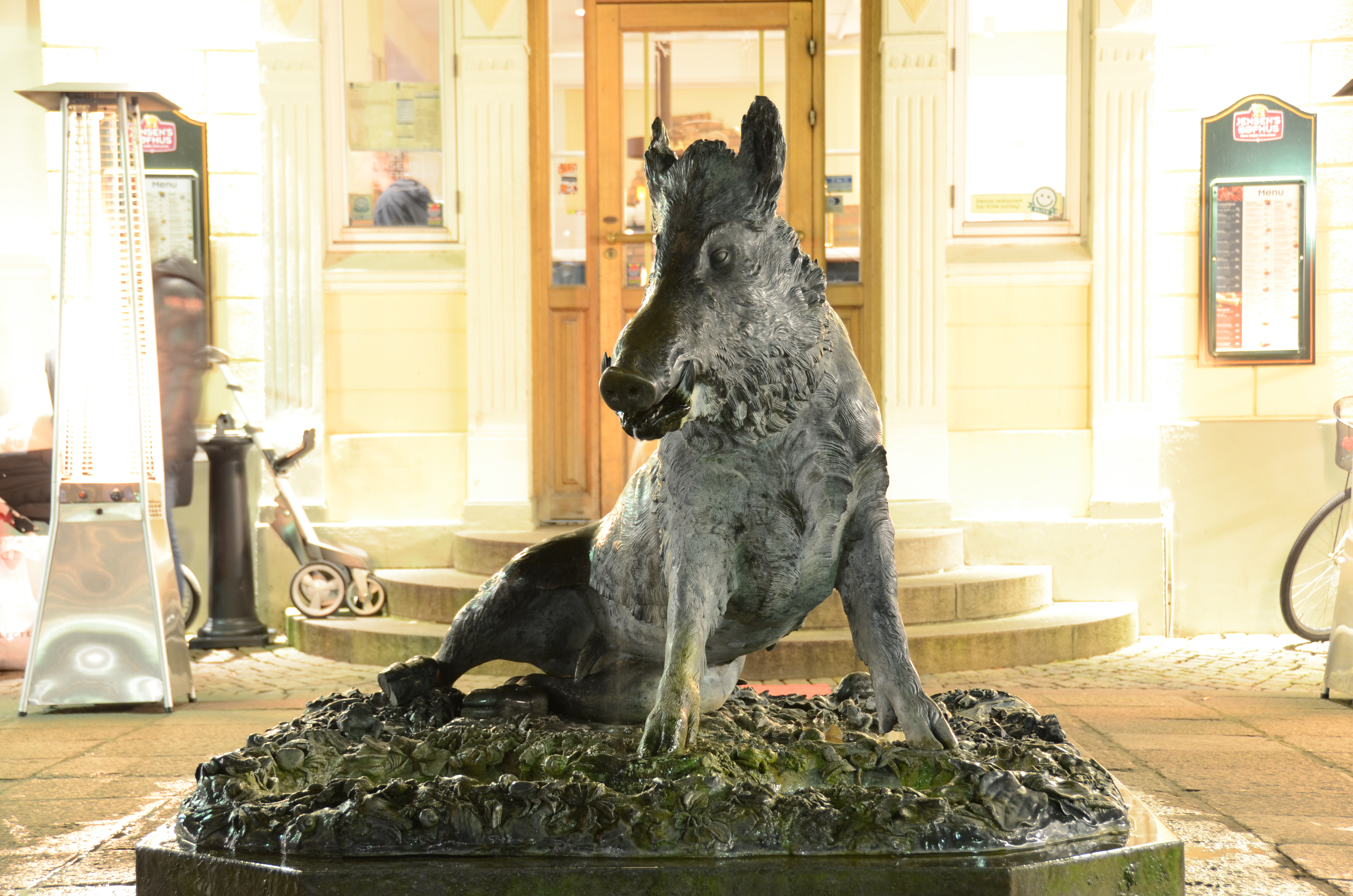
Il Porcellino, Bronzesvinet at Brotorvet, Holstebro, Denmark

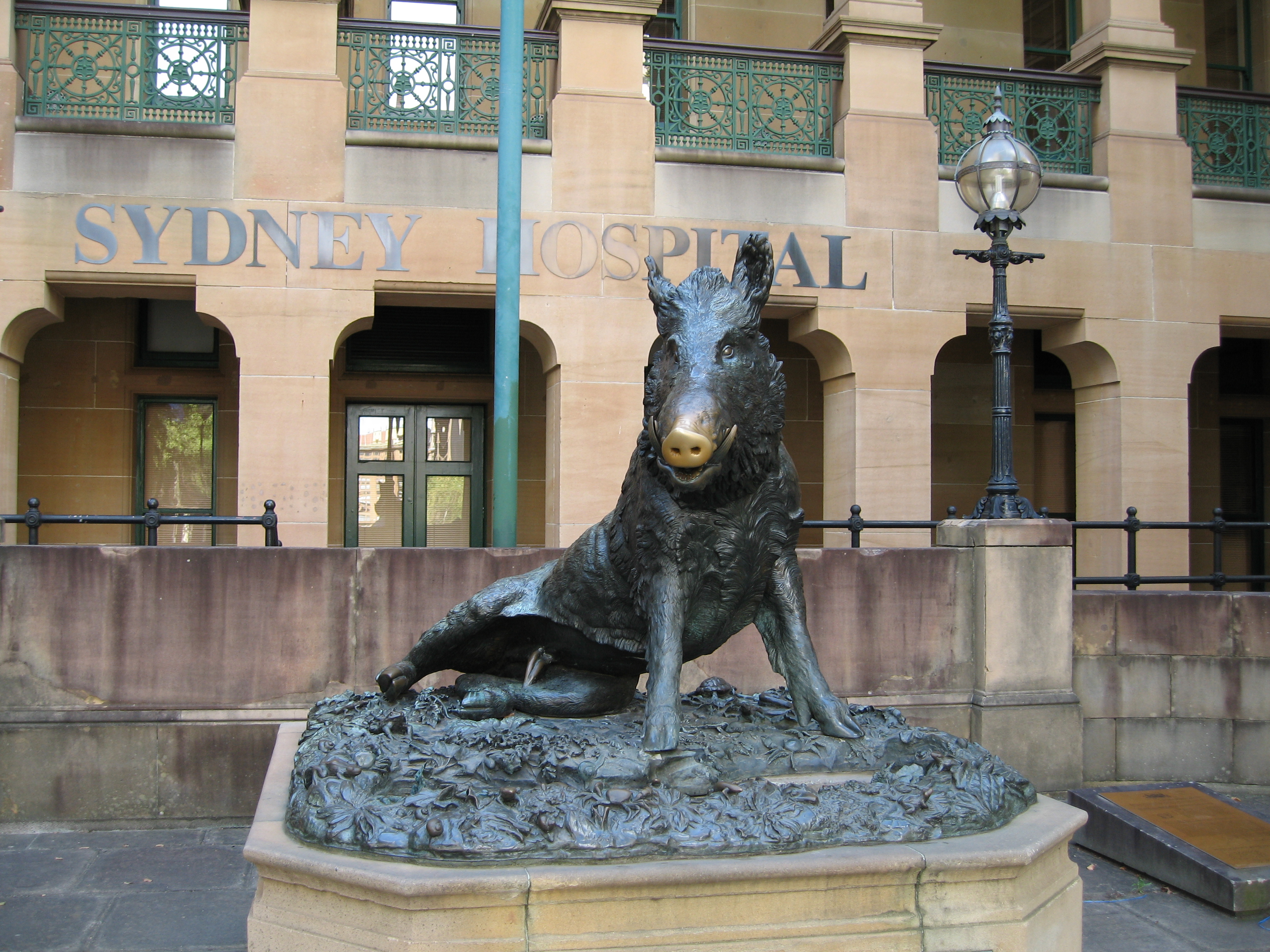
A copy (1962) in Sydney

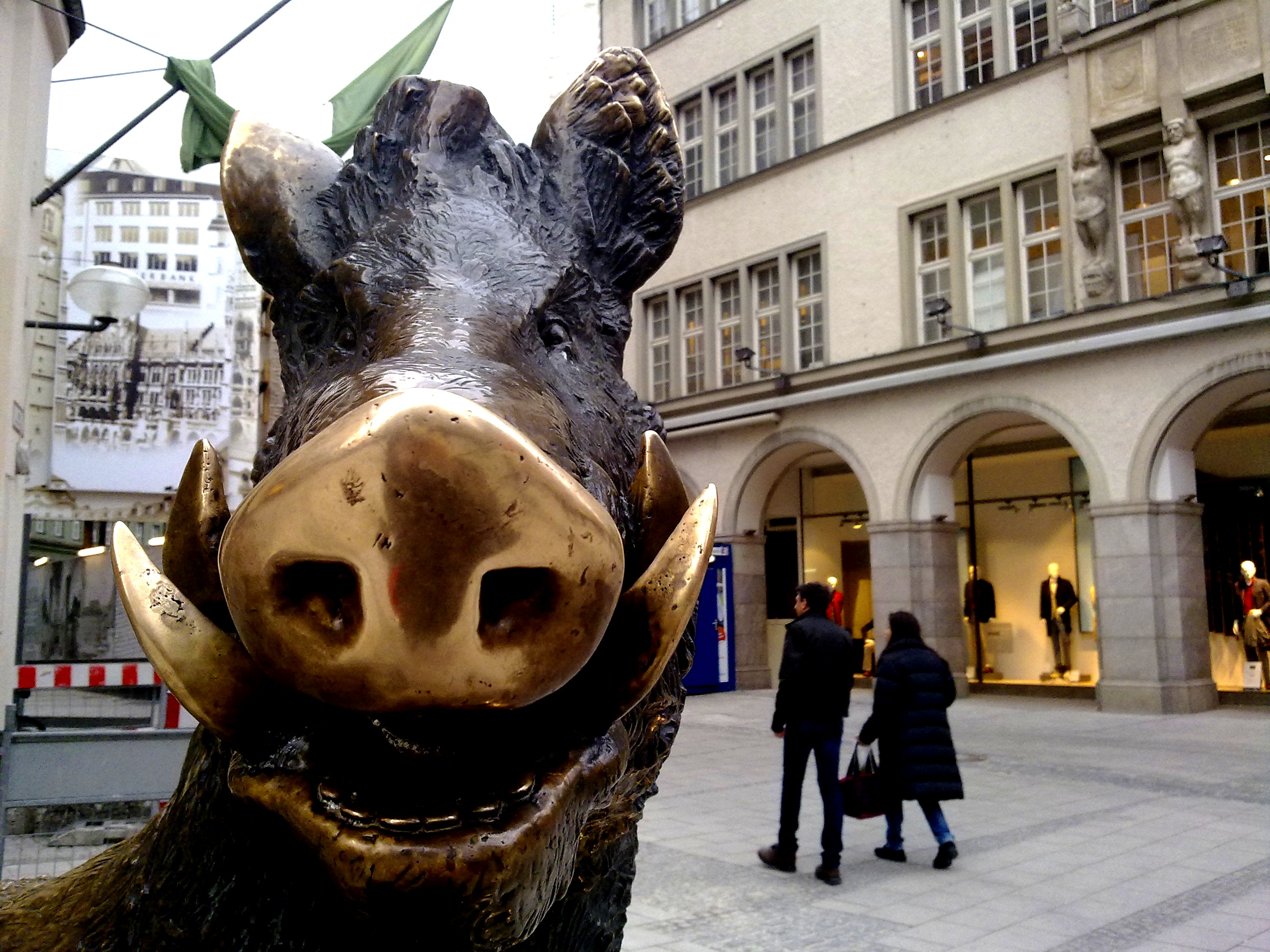
In front of the German Hunting and Fishing Museum in Munich, Germany

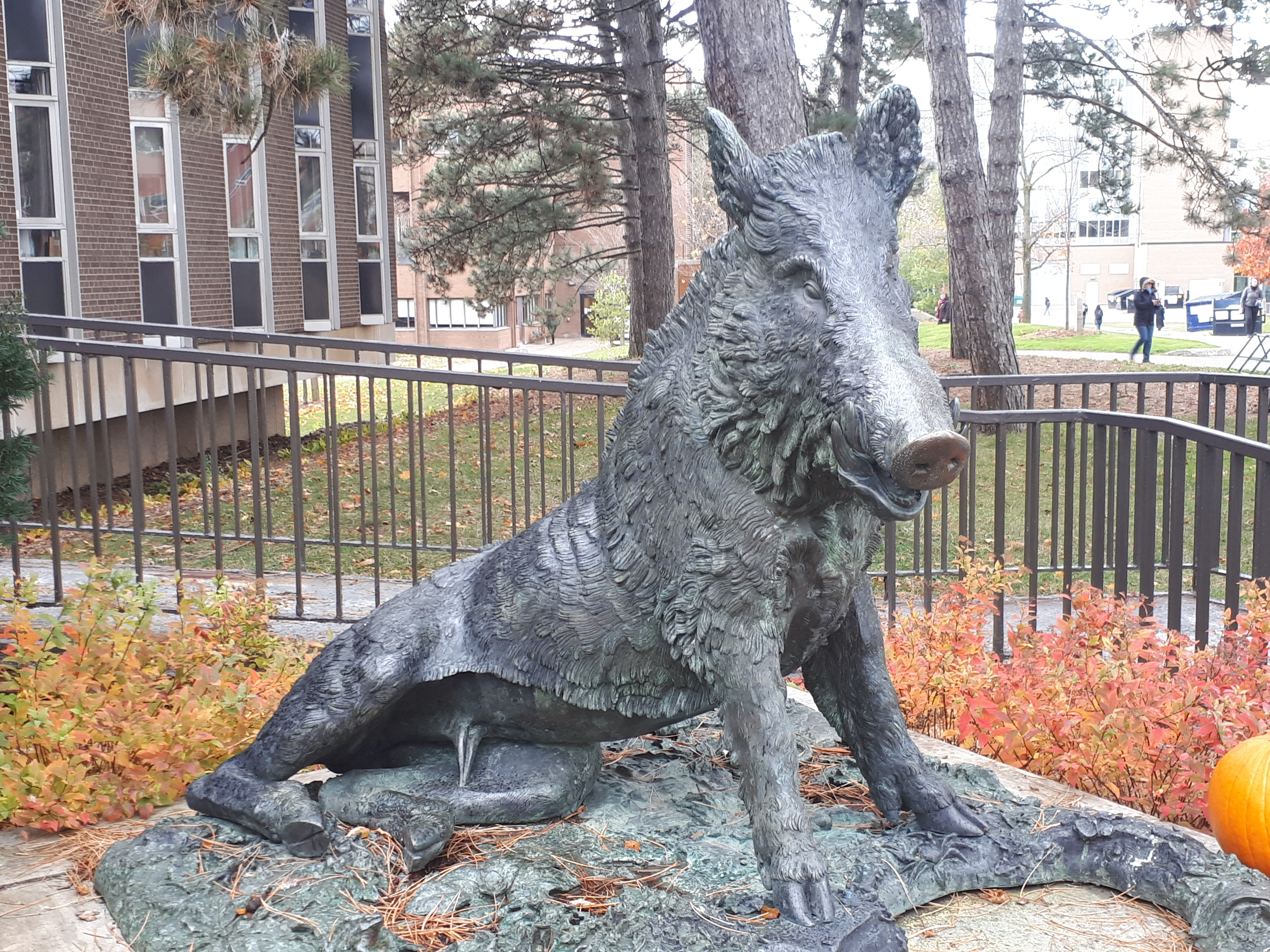
On the University of Waterloo campus

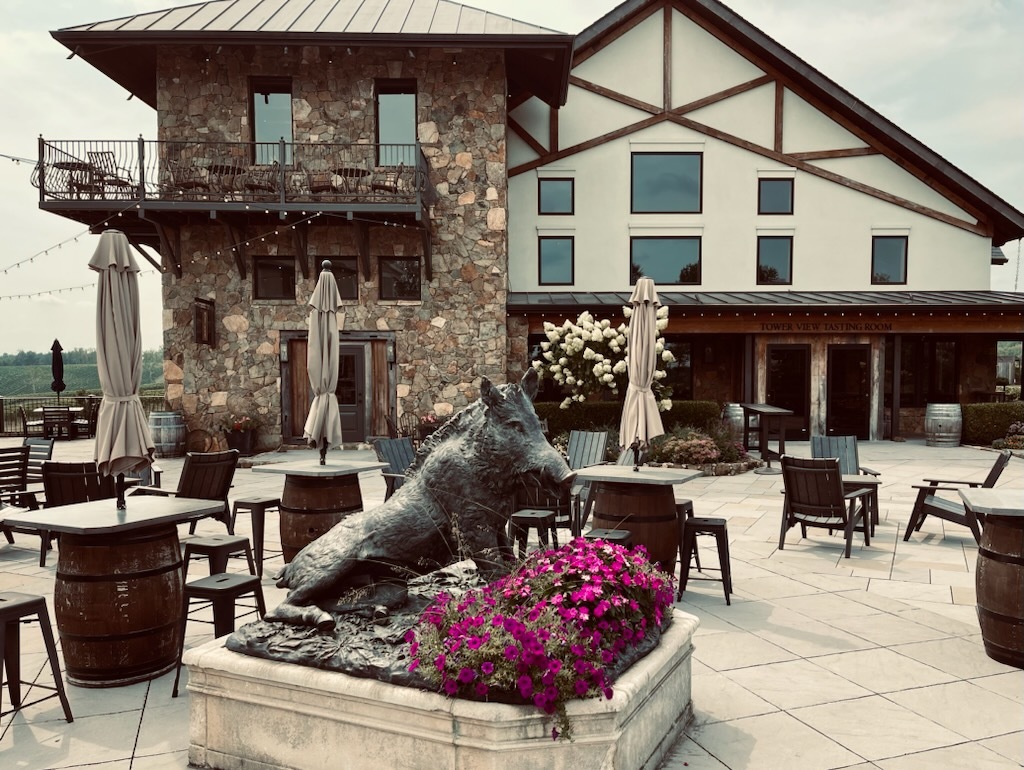
At Stone Tower Winery, Leesburg, Virginia
