= Sydney Hospital =

- South Eastern Sydney and Illawarra Area Health Service
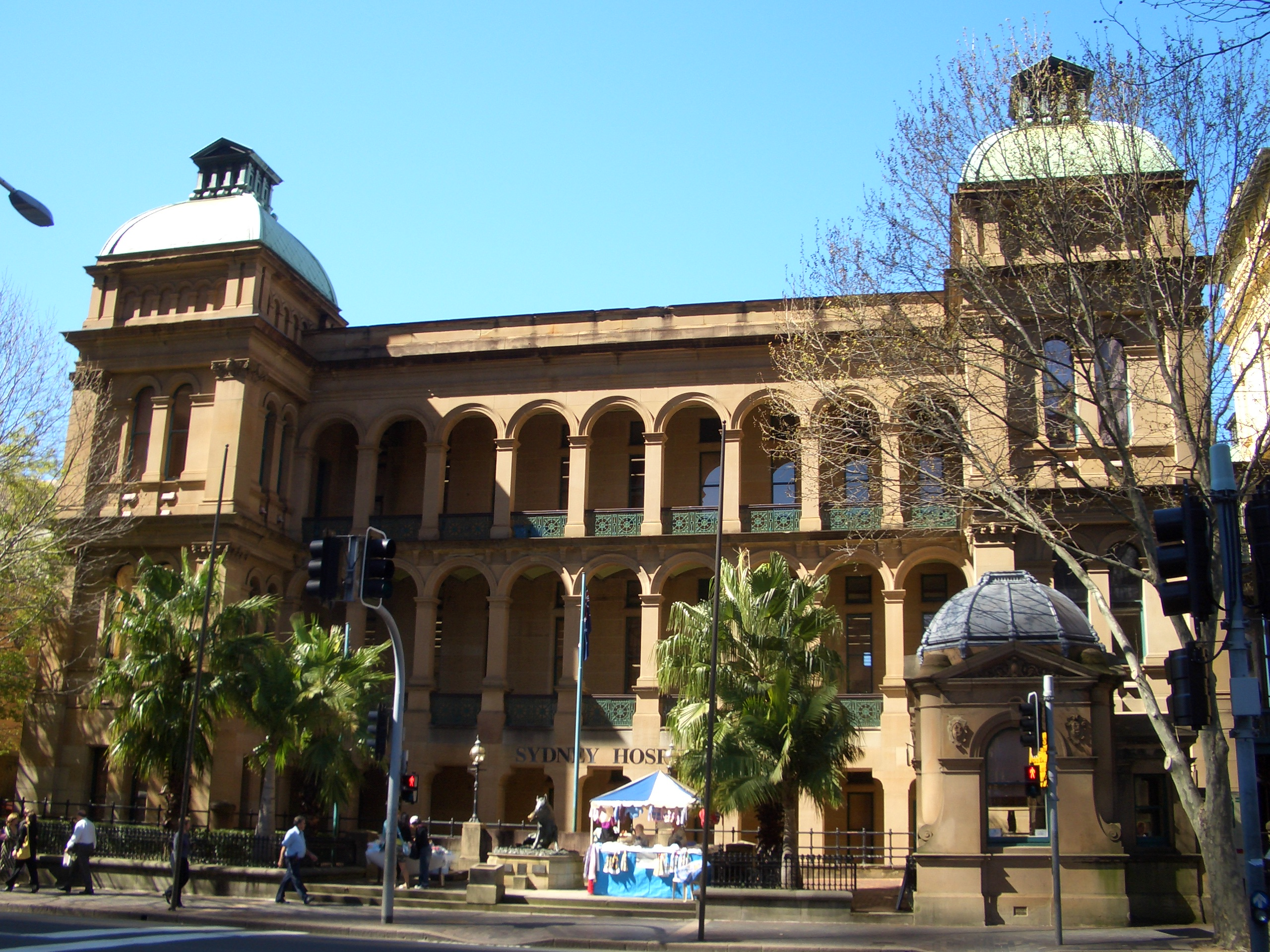
- View from Macquarie Street

Geography
- Location: Macquarie Street, Sydney, New South Wales, Australia
- Coordinates: 33.868157°S 151.21238°E

Organisation
- Care system: Public Medicare (AU)
- Type: General
- Affiliated university: University of New South Wales University of Sydney

Services
- Emergency department: Yes
- Beds: 113

History
- Founded: 1788 (original hospital); 1811 (current site)

Links
- Lists: Hospitals in Australia

Sydney Hospital, historically known as the Rum Hospital, is a major hospital in Sydney, Australia, located on Macquarie Street in the Sydney central business district. It is the oldest hospital in Australia, dating back to 1788, and has been at its current location since 1811. It first received the name Sydney Hospital in 1881.

Currently the hospital comprises 113 inpatient beds. There are about 400 staff members. Specialist services attract patients from all over New South Wales. It specialises in ophthalmology and hand surgery and is a referral hospital for patients requiring these services. It also houses a rudimentary 6-bed Emergency Department.

Sydney Hospital became a teaching hospital of the University of Sydney in 1909. Sydney Hospital is associated with Sydney Medical School of the University of Sydney through the Discipline of Clinical Ophthalmology and Eye Health and Save Sight Institute. It is also the location of a number of research institutes associated with the University, including the Heart Research Institute, the Centenary Institute for Cancer Medicine and Cell Biology, the Kanematsu Memorial Institute of Pathology and the General Endocrinology Group.

== Early history ==
=== 1788 and the Tent Hospital ===
Many of the 736 convicts who survived the voyage of the First Fleet from Portsmouth, England arrived suffering from dysentery, smallpox, scurvy, and typhoid. Soon after landing Governor Phillip and Surgeon-General John White established a tent hospital along what is now George Street in The Rocks to care for the worst cases. Subsequent convict boatloads had even higher rates of death and disease. A portable hospital which was prefabricated in England from wood and copper arrived in Sydney with the Second Fleet in 1790. Present-day Nurses Walk in The Rocks cuts across where the site of the early hospital once was. John White was Surgeon-General at Sydney Cove between 1788 and 1794.

Original elevations for the General Hospital, otherwise known as the "Rum Hospital", from 1811

=== Governor Macquarie's Rum Hospital ===
Upon his arrival in the Colony of New South Wales at the beginning of 1810, Governor Macquarie discovered that the Sydney Cove's hospital was an affair of tents and temporary buildings. Macquarie set aside land on the western edge of the Government Domain for a new hospital and created a new road – Macquarie Street – to provide access to it. Plans were drawn up but the British Government refused to provide funds to build the hospital. Consequently, Macquarie entered into a contract with a consortium of businessmen–Garnham Blaxcell, Alexander Riley and, later, D'Arcy Wentworth–to erect the new hospital. They were to receive convict labour and supplies and a monopoly on rum imports from which they expected to recoup the cost of the building and gain considerable profits. The contract allowed them to import 45,000 (later increased to 60,000) gallons of rum to sell to colonists and was signed on 6 November 1810. In the event, the hospital did not turn out to be very profitable for the contractors. Convict patients were transferred to Governor Macquarie's new hospital in 1816.

It is unclear who prepared the design for the three Old Colonial Georgian buildings comprising the Sydney Hospital complex, but there were apparently many involved with its construction. There is speculation that both Governor Macquarie and John O'Hearen contributed to the design. John O’Hearen is probably the stronger contender for being the building's designer, for he not only defended the methods of its construction against critics but also signed himself as 'Architect' in related correspondence.

=== Shoddy construction ===
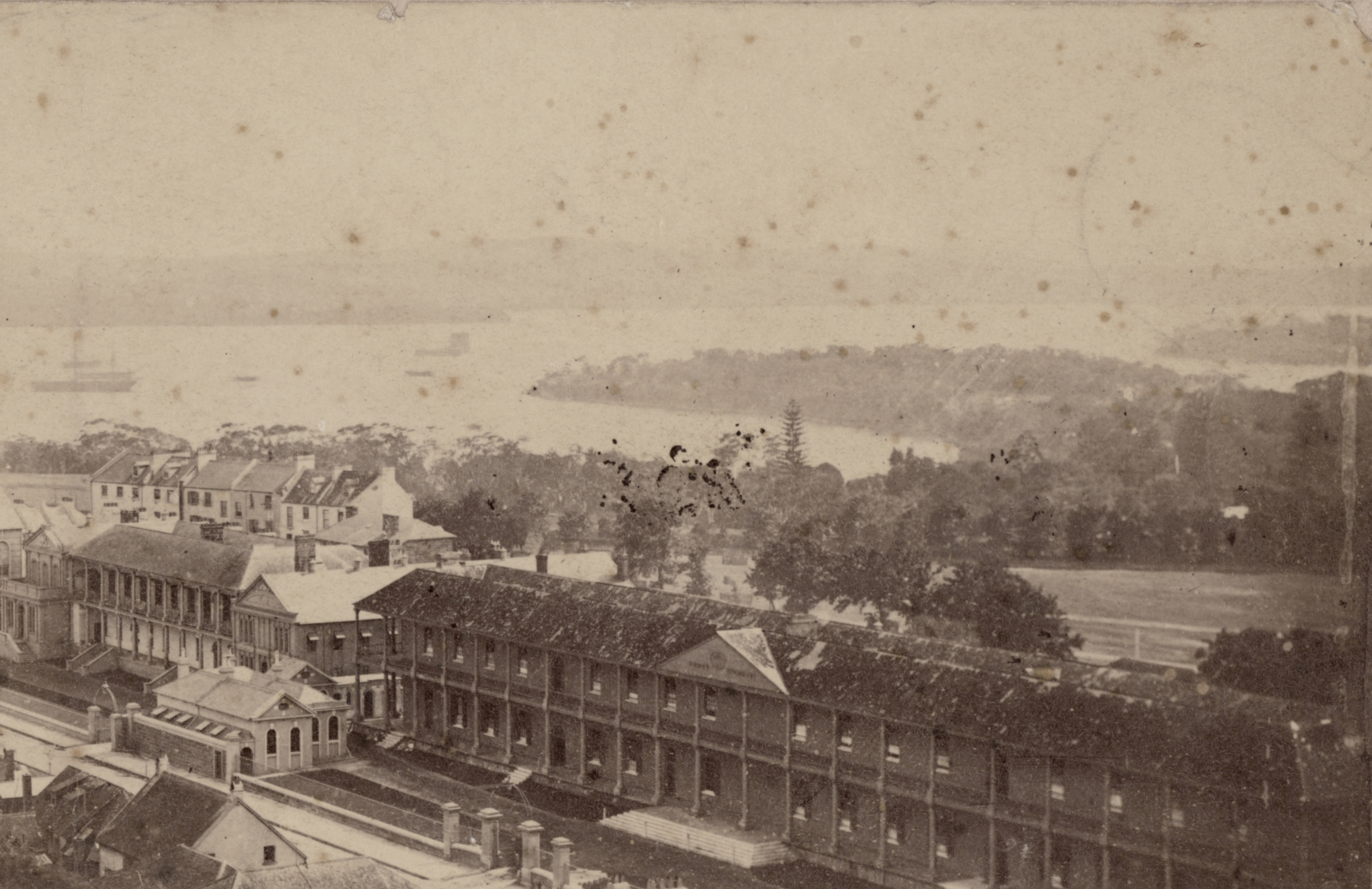
The hospital complex in 1875, with the Central Building and North Wing (now remodelled as Parliament House) in view.

As the hospital was nearing completion in 1815, the now famous convict architect Francis Greenway was asked to report on the quality of the work. He condemned it, claiming that it "must soon fall into ruin". Short-cuts had been taken with the construction and there were weak joints in the structural beams, rotting stonework, feeble foundations, and dry rot in the timbers. Macquarie ordered the contractors to remedy these defects but by 1820 the southern wing was deemed particularly unsafe, with reports that some of it had collapsed and had to be rebuilt. Around this time, Greenway was commissioned to undertake repairs to both the wings of the hospital, including alterations to the roof of the southern wing and the rearrangement of its internal spaces. More substantial repairs were carried out on the southern wing in 1826. Many defects present from the original construction remained hidden away until the extensive restoration of the 1980s.

== Alternative uses ==
The scale of the hospital was greater than that which could be sustained by Sydney at that time. The new hospital had a large central building, which was the main hospital, and two smaller wings which were quarters for the surgeons. From the start, portions of the buildings were allocated for non-medical purposes. During construction there was ongoing debate about the hospital's future possible use.

=== The North Wing ===
Governor Macquarie was under pressure, both within the colony and from Lord Bathurst, to utilise part of the General Hospital as a temporary Supreme Court, perhaps while awaiting the construction of the Greenway designed law courts opposite. Macquarie capitulated and the northern wing (originally designed for the Principal Surgeon) and a portion of the central building were given over to Supreme Court Judge Jeffrey Hart Bent as chambers as well as for a temporary courthouse.

The first Surgeon to reside at the hospital's Surgeons quarters was D'Arcy Wentworth, whose other connections with the building are interesting. First, he had been one of the three contractors who had built the Hospital under the "rum contract" with Macquarie, and secondly, his son, William Charles Wentworth, explorer and journalist, became one of the most important figures in the development of Parliamentary democracy in New South Wales, and is regarded as the "father of the constitution". He is well commemorated by artworks within Parliament House.

The partially remodelled North Wing in 1848, with the added Legislative Council chamber from 1843.

On 3 January 1829, Governor Darling released a despatch foreshadowing the intended appropriation of the North Wing for the accommodation of the Legislative Councils. The first meeting of the 14 member Legislative Council in the North Wing occurred on 21 August 1829. The 'First Legislative Council' stayed until 1848. During this time the surgeons continued to occupy about one third of the space. Other rooms were sometimes occupied by other government officials, such as the Principal Supervisor of Convicts, until 1852, when the Legislature took over the entire building.

=== The South Wing ===
When the General Hospital was completed in 1816 the southern wing was used for its planned purpose as the quarters for the Assistant Surgeon as well as a storage facility. However, from 1823 the 39th Regiment, and briefly the 57th Regiment, used some of the rooms as hospital wards. The staff office (including "clerical offices and a medical depot") for the Military occupied the southern wing until 1854. From 1836, the Store Master also lived there, sharing the upper rooms with the Assistant Surgeon.

There were plans for the southern wing to become a military hospital in 1840, however this did not come to fruition.

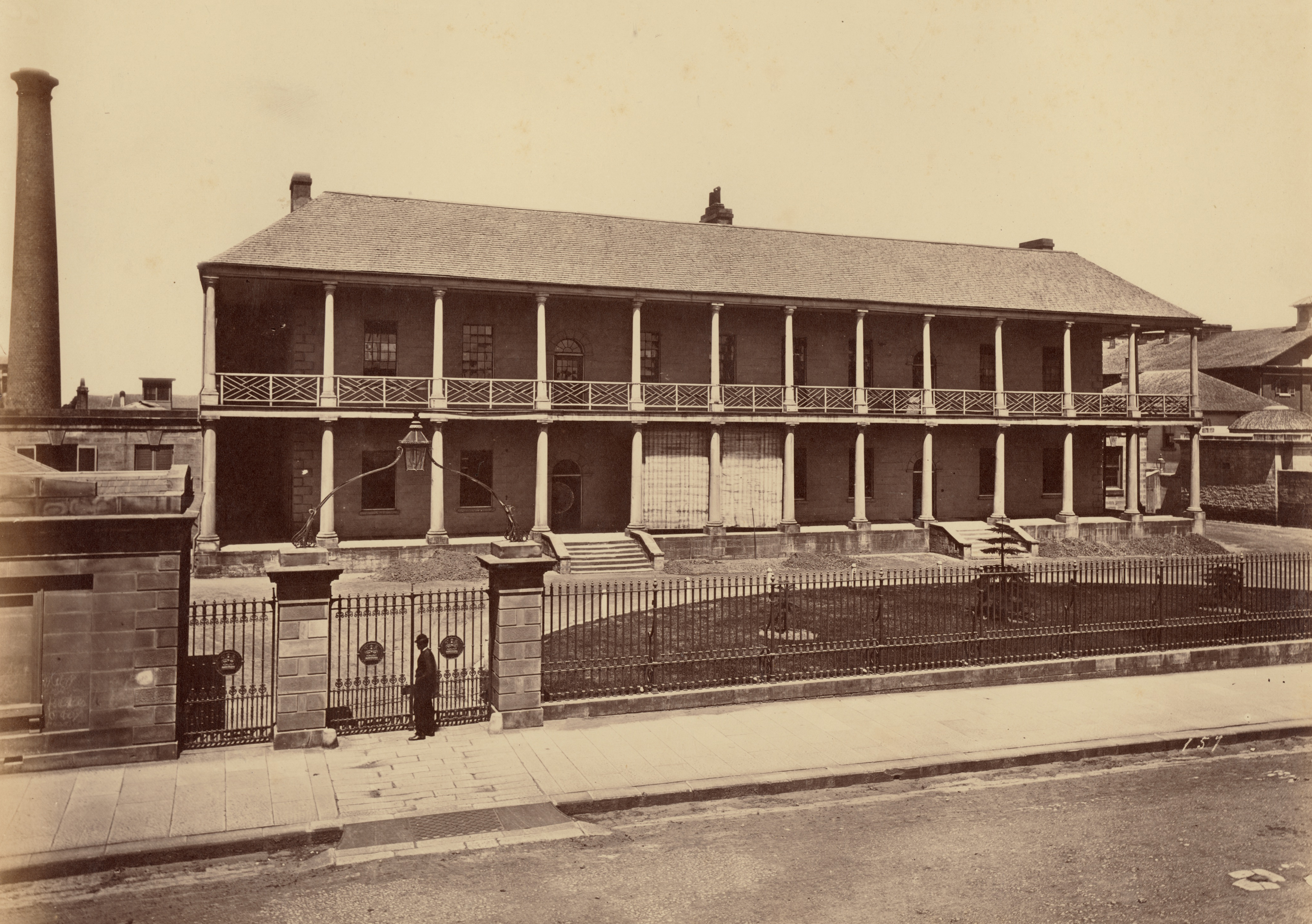
The South Wing in 1870, used as the Sydney Mint

Colonial governments accepted a degree of responsibility for pauper patients who were not convicts. However, as convict numbers declined and the emancipated and free population grew, the government disengaged itself from direct responsibility for the 'respectable poor'. Meanwhile, the Sydney Dispensary had been created in 1826 to provide outpatient care for 'free poor persons, unable to pay for medical attendance'. It was conducted on traditional charitable lines and operated from several city premises before obtaining the south wing of the Rum Hospital in 1845 where it remained until 1848. This change in use of the South Wing required more repairs to the internal and external building fabric from 1843. At the same time, the Sydney Dispensary expanded to serve inpatients and changed its name to the Sydney Infirmary and Dispensary, a title officially approved in 1844. Convict inpatients continued to be treated in the separately managed hospital in the centre wing, next door. With the dissolution of the convict hospital system, the Sydney Infirmary and Dispensary gave up the south wing in 1848 in return for permissive occupancy of the entire middle section of the Rum Hospital complex. In 1851, the New South Wales Legislative Council petitioned to establish a mint in Sydney, to take advantage of the gold discovered by Edward Hargraves at Ophir, just outside Bathurst. This proposal received Royal Assent in 1853. Plans were drawn up for the Sydney branch on a site selected at the corner of Bridge and Macquarie Streets, however it was decided to locate the mint in the southern wing of the general hospital to save time and costs. The South Wing officially became the Sydney branch of the Royal Mint in 1854. Its establishment required the extensive internal remodelling of the former hospital wing for accommodation for the Mint Master, administrative offices and receiving and storage rooms for bullion. Land to the rear of the building was also developed, with prefabricated industrial buildings for rolling, assaying and coining imported from England and erected around a courtyard directly behind the former hospital building. The Mint was shut down in 1926 when the Royal Melbourne Mint became the mint of the Commonwealth. The building has since accommodated numerous government departments and various law courts.

In 1982 the Mint Offices building opened as "Australia's first museum of historical decorative arts, stamps and coins", although the coining factory buildings at the rear continued to be used as law courts and as a workshop for the Department of Public Works. The Mint Museum won both the New South Wales and National Museum of the Year Awards in 1983. In 1993-5 the museum was re-developed as the Sydney Mint Museum, focusing on the impact of the Gold Rush years on New South Wales and the role of The Mint as a coining factory. However, this re-developed museum was short-lived, closing in 1997. The property, comprising The Mint Offices and courtyard was transferred to the Historic Houses Trust in 1998.

The Central Building in 1870

=== The Central Building ===
The now deteriorating central building was demolished in 1879 and in 1880 Thomas Rowe won an architectural competition held to find a new design with his Victorian Classical Revival design. Rowe was heavily criticised by his peers for the practice of under quoting building costs in order to win a competition, and the Sydney Infirmary was his cause célèbre. Work halted for some years after partial construction, awaiting the approval of additional funds from the New South Wales parliament. Architect John Kirkpatrick completed the new hospital in 1894 to a revised design.

The new hospital buildings in 1900, on the site of the former Central Building

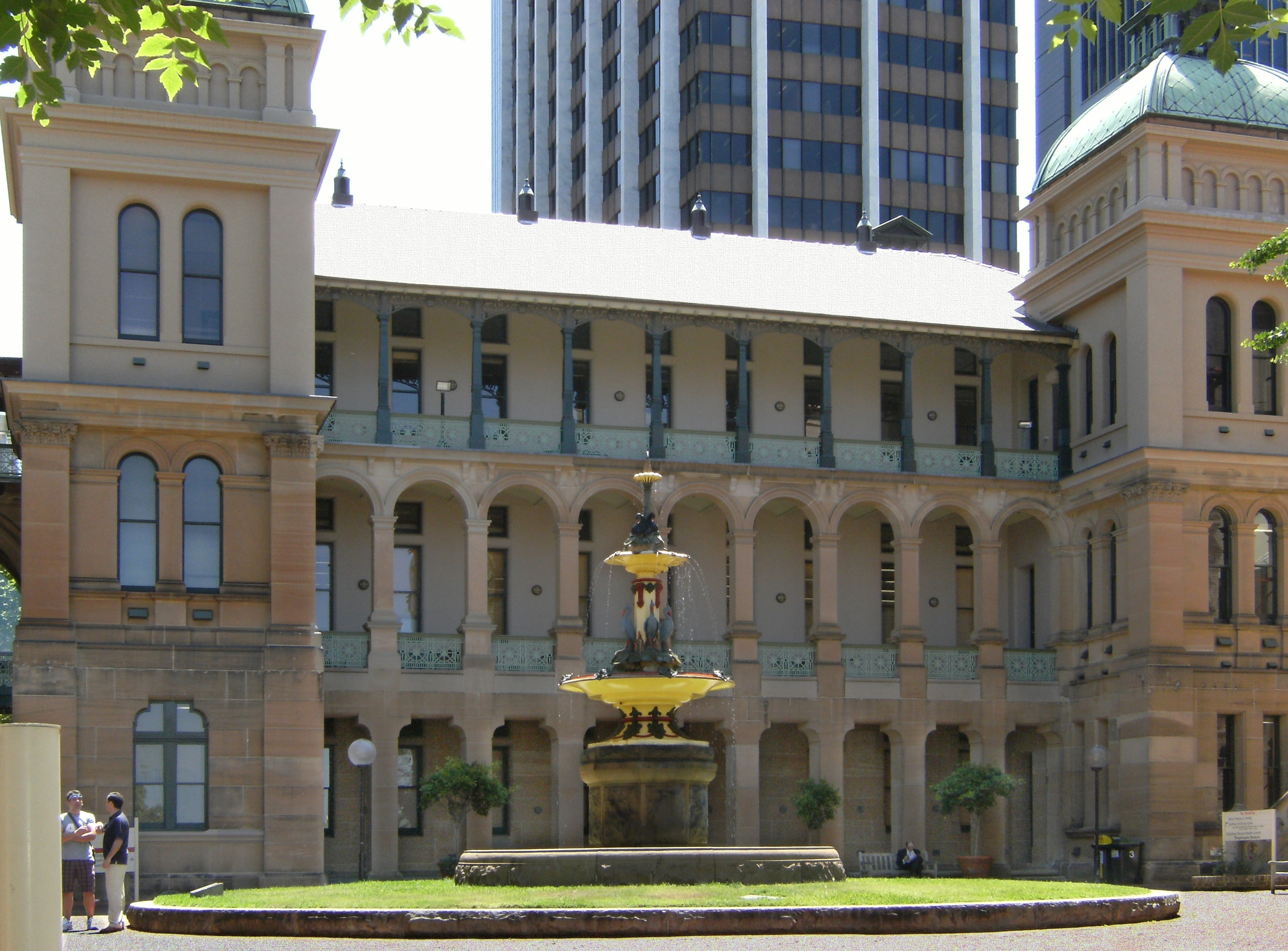
The courtyard of the present Sydney Hospital

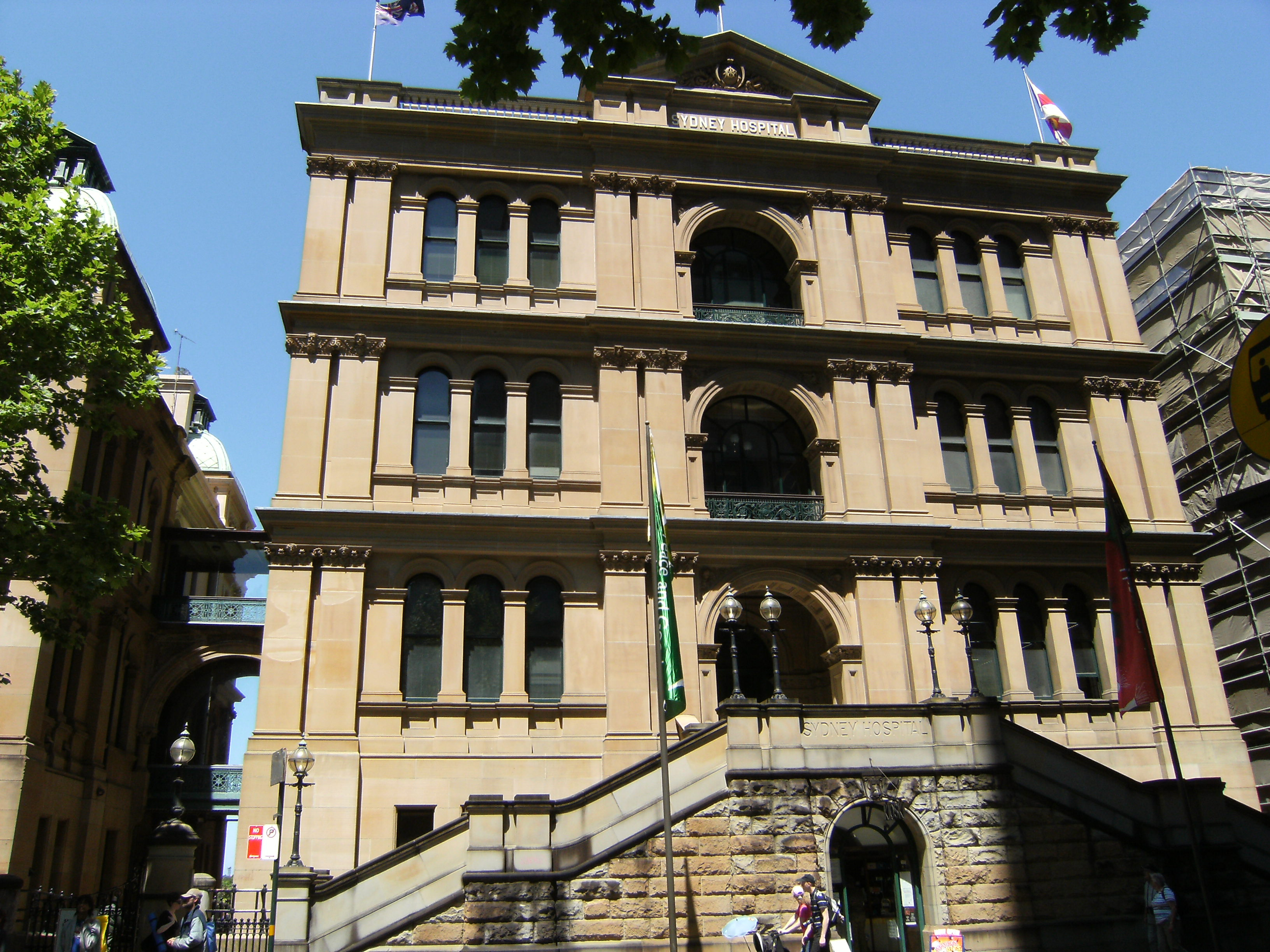
Sydney Hospital from Macquarie Street

== Lucy Osburn ==
New South Wales politician Henry Parkes (who later became premier) was concerned about the state of the Sydney Infirmary and Dispensary and appealed for help to Florence Nightingale for trained nurses. Consequently, in March 1868 Lucy Osburn was sent out as Lady Superintendent of the Infirmary and was accompanied by five trained nurses. Osburn won Parkes' trust and began the challenging task of cleaning up the crumbling, foul-smelling and vermin-infested Infirmary. A week after their arrival they had a royal patient, when the Duke of Edinburgh was wounded by a would-be assassin at Clontarf. They nursed him at Government House, not Sydney Hospital. In spite of the public acclaim this brought them, Lucy Osburn and her staff faced much resistance in their efforts to reform the infirmary. In addition to the appalling conditions, they met with hostility and opposition. The idea of gentlewomen working as hospital nurses was still novel, and to many people shocking. Lucy was continually obstructed by one surgeon, Dr Alfred Roberts, and personally attacked in the Parliament.

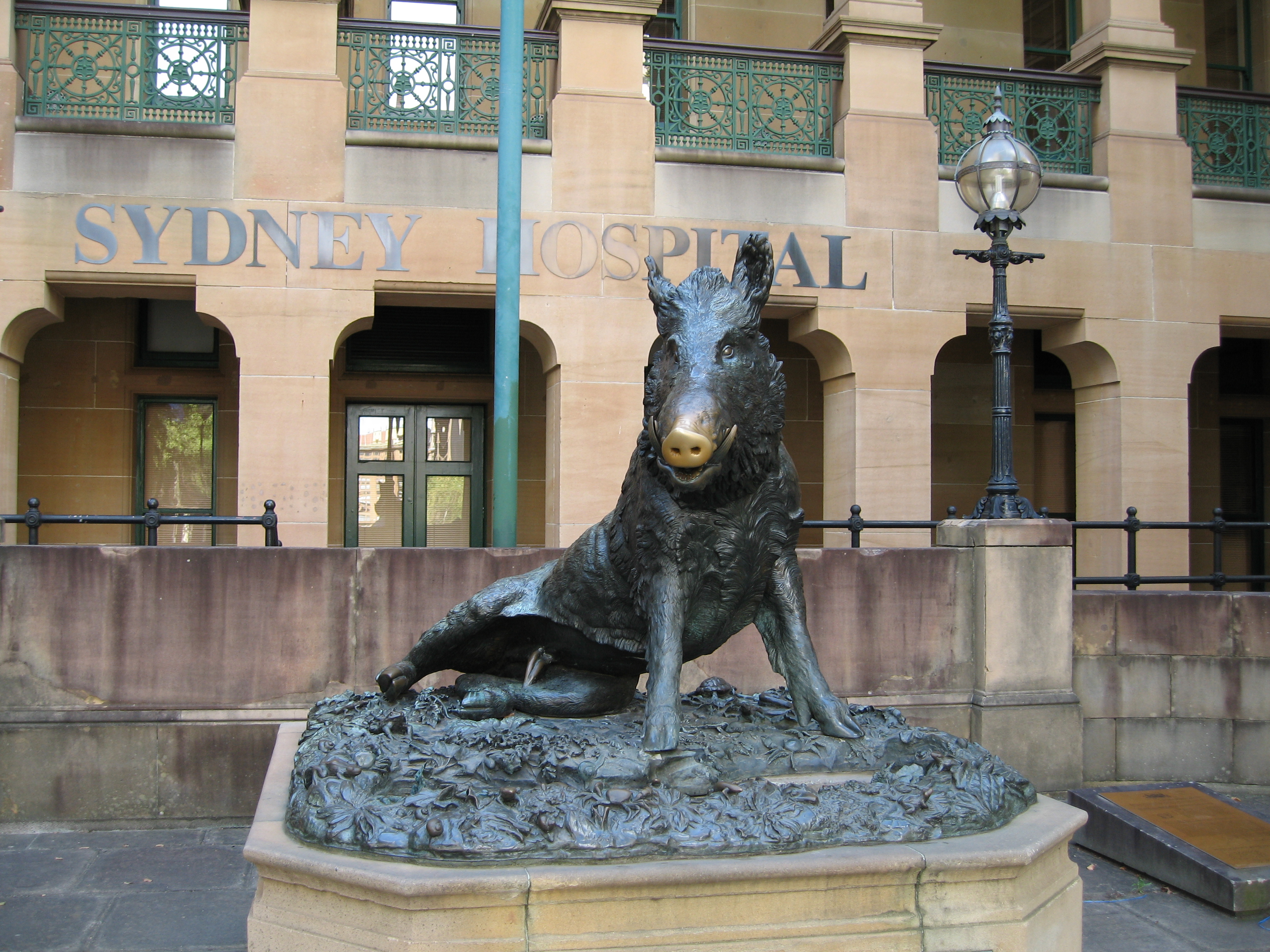
Il Porcellino, a bronze copy of the Florentine boar, was donated in 1968 in honour of Thomas Fiaschi and stands outside the hospital.

A Royal Commission on public charities in 1873 condemned the Sydney Infirmary, accusing the management committee of neglect and interfering in the duties of the nurses. Osburn was vindicated and the commission praised her work toward the improvement in the standards of nursing. A number of the Lucy Osburn's Sisters took up positions as matrons at various hospitals. By these means the Nightingale teaching and standards became accepted practice in the hospital system of the colony. By the time she returned to England she had laid the foundation of modern nursing in New South Wales.

In 1881 the Infirmary's name was changed to the Sydney Hospital. Lucy Osburn left Sydney in 1884 and returned to London. After some years nursing among the sick and poor in London, she died of diabetes at her sister's home in Harrogate on 22 December 1891. Lucy Osburn was described by her successor at Sydney Hospital, Miss McKay, as "an exceptional woman" who regarded nursing "as the highest employment" to be entered with "a spirit of devotion". One of her common recommendations to those taking up the profession was reported as being "you nurses should exist for patients, not they for you".

== The Nightingale Wing ==
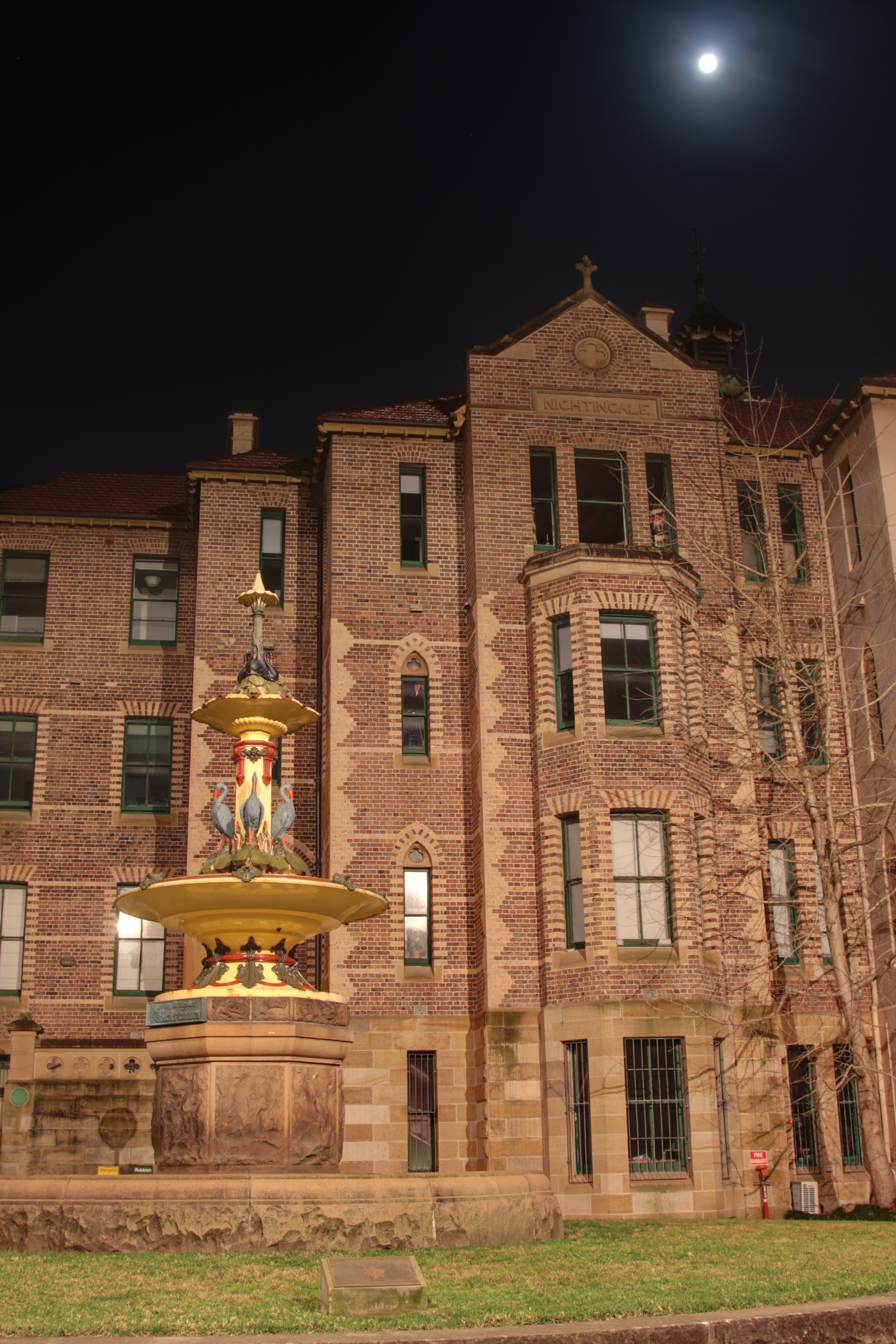
Robert Brough fountain and Nightingale Wing

Nurse training in Australia began on site in 1868 when Florence Nightingale sent out Lucy Osburn and five other English sisters. The brick and sandstone Gothic Revival Nightingale Wing of 1869 off the central courtyard, with its colourful fountain, was built to house the female staff of the hospital with the input of Florence Nightingale.

== Restoration ==
By 1984, restoration of the old Rum Hospital building was complete. Together with its "twin" the former Mint, it remains the oldest building in Macquarie Street and the oldest public building in the City of Sydney. Arguably of all Sydney buildings, none have had a longer or more central influence in the affairs of the state than the North Wing.

== Recent work ==
The Sydney Eye Hospital started at Millers Point in 1882 and moved to Woolloomooloo in 1922. It joined the Sydney Hospital campus in 1996. Recent work includes the construction of an eight level car park, ground floor emergency with eye hospital outpatients, two levels of wards and an operating theatre on the top floor. The new work enabled the demolition of the Travers building, long considered an eyesore, thereby allowing the campus to be opened up to The Domain.

The new Clinical Services building was completed during 1995 to complement the existing architectural style and was officially opened on 30 October 1996.

== See also ==
- Health care in Australia
  - List of hospitals in Australia
- History of public health in Australia
