= The Dragon's Call =

First episode of the TV series Merlin

- Merlin episode
- The Great Dragon informs Merlin of his destiny. The dragon was completely computer-generated.
- Episode no.: Series 1 Episode 1
- Directed by: James Hawes
- Written by: Julian Jones
- Original air date: 20 September 2008
- Running time: 45 minutes

Guest appearances
- John Hurt - the voice of the Great Dragon; Eve Myles - Lady Helen/Mary Collins; Caroline Faber - Hunith; Ed Coleman - Morris; Gary Oliver - Gregory; Louise Dylan - Bronwen

Episode chronology
← Previous —	Next → "Valiant"
- Merlin (series 1)

"The Dragon's Call" is the first episode of the first series of the British fantasy-adventure family television series Merlin. Written by Julian Jones and directed by James Hawes, the episode was first broadcast on BBC One on 20 September 2008.

The episode tells the arrival of Merlin (Colin Morgan) as a young man in Camelot, where magic is banned by King Uther Pendragon (Anthony Head). Taken under the wing of Camelot's physician, Gaius (Richard Wilson), he is warned that he must keep his innate magical ability a secret. In Camelot, he meets Uther's heir, the arrogant Prince Arthur (Bradley James), as well as Lady Morgana (Katie McGrath) and her handmaid, Guinevere (Angel Coulby). As a witch (Eve Myles) plans revenge on the King's heir for the execution of her son, Merlin is informed by a cryptic dragon (John Hurt) that his destiny is to protect Arthur.

Merlin was conceived by Julian Murphy and Johnny Capps to be an origin story for the characters of the Arthurian legends, with family-centered entertainment. Young actors with little experience were cast as the four lead characters, while better-known actors were cast in supporting roles. Many of the scenes in Camelot were filmed in France, at the Château de Pierrefonds, while the rest was filmed in England and Wales. Special effects were done by The Mill, who had the task of creating the talking dragon. "The Dragon's Call" was watched by 7.15 million viewers in the UK and 6.3 million in the US on NBC. Critical reception was mixed, with some feeling the show had promise but lacked imagination, and the actual plot of "The Dragon's Call" was deemed slight.

== Plot ==
Merlin (Colin Morgan), a young sorcerer, arrives in Camelot just in time to witness the execution of Thomas Collins, a man accused of sorcery, by the order of King Uther Pendragon (Anthony Head), who has banned the practice of magic in his kingdom on pain of death. As soon as the man is beheaded, Uther declares to the watching crowd that he shall throw a festival to celebrate twenty years since he wiped out magic and magicians from the kingdom. When he finishes his announcements, a hideous old hag, Thomas' mother Mary (Eve Myles), swears revenge for the murder of her son, "a son for a son!", before vanishing to avoid arrest. The King's ward, Morgana (Katie McGrath), warns that Uther may be making enemies through his hatred and radical methods of wiping out magic.

Merlin reports to Camelot's physician Gaius (Richard Wilson) and saves the old man's life when he falls from a balcony by magically moving a mattress to cushion his fall. Though initially denying his abilities, Merlin later admits that he has had magical powers since birth, which Gaius warns him to keep secret. Reading a letter from Merlin's mother, Gaius realises that the boy was sent to Camelot for protection. Meanwhile, in the forest outside Camelot, Mary kills Lady Helen (Myles), a singer who is to perform at Uther's court, with a poppet. Mary assumes Helen's appearance using an enchantment, though her true hideous appearance can still be seen in her reflection (like in mirrors or water).

Outside, Merlin stands up for a servant who is being bullied by his master, but as the master turns out to be the King's spoiled son, Arthur (Bradley James), Merlin is imprisoned. For the second night in a row, he hears a voice calling his name. Gaius frees him the next morning, though Merlin has to spend time in the stocks. There he meets Morgana's handmaiden Guinevere or "Gwen" (Angel Coulby), who commends him for being brave. Merlin confronts Arthur after being released, who tricks him into a fight with maces. Merlin keeps Arthur away using magic, which is met with ridicule by Gaius. Hearing the same voice calling his name that night, Merlin follows it to a cave where a dragon (John Hurt) informs him that he is destined to protect Arthur with his powers.

Gaius instructs Merlin to deliver elixirs to Morgana and Lady Helen; in the latter's room he finds the poppet, but bluffs his way out of discovery. Later, Helen kills a handmaiden who glimpses her true form in a mirror. At the feast, Mary sings an enchantment as Lady Helen, causing all the guests to fall asleep. Merlin, realising what is going on, covers his ears. Mary attempts to kill Arthur, but Merlin drops a chandelier on her with magic before she releases the dagger. As she has stopped singing, the enchantment is lifted and her true appearance is revealed. In a last effort she throws the dagger at Arthur, but Merlin slows time to pull him out of the way. Mary dies from her injuries, having failed in her attempt to avenge her son. Uther rewards Merlin by making him Arthur's servant, though neither boy is thrilled with the idea. The next day, Gaius gives Merlin a book on magic, under condition that he keep it hidden.

== Production ==
=== Conception and development ===
Merlin was conceived by Shine Television producers Julian Murphy and Johnny Capps, who had worked together on Hex, a fantasy series produced by Shine for Sky One. The two had enjoyed presenting a "high-concept" show, and wished to do more. The BBC had been interested in broadcasting a drama based on the character of Merlin for some time; a little over a year before the Shine series was initiated, writer and producer Chris Chibnall had been developing a project aimed at a BBC One Sunday night slot, which was ultimately not commissioned. The programme was intended for family entertainment and designed to appeal to a wide audience.

As the Arthurian legends do not reflect genuine historical events, not being set in any one singular period in time, the show's creators were more interested in conveying a world that felt "real". Not constrained by historical accuracy, they had many opportunities to build the world in which they set their series; for example, tomatoes were included despite being absent from Europe in the Medieval era, and there was never a dragon in the earliest texts involving Merlin. The series was intended to have an "epic scale" that would have a wide "cross-generational" appeal; films such as Raiders of the Lost Ark were cited as inspiration. Despite this, the creators strived to have smaller moments that the audience could relate to and comedy to lighten the darker tone. A fairy-tale aspect was also incorporated - highlighted in "The Dragon's Call" with the singing and cobwebs - to set the programme apart from others. Beauty and the Beast was an inspiration in this respect. Merlin was also influenced by the US show Smallville, about the early years of Superman; Murphy and Capps said that Smallville helped provide the idea of a "Camelot that existed before its golden age". The creators wanted to show Merlin, Arthur, Gwen and Morgana in their youth, "before they were famous". Murphy and Capps intended for the four young characters and situations to be relatable to young viewers. They also put the characters in unusual positions with respect to their later, well-known roles to make the audience wonder how they would reach those roles; for example, Guinevere, the future Queen of Camelot and wife of Arthur, is a servant with a romantic interest in Merlin. Looking back at "The Dragon's Call", Murphy and Capps felt that it had so much to introduce in terms of world and characters that there was not enough of the main plot of the episode.

=== Casting ===
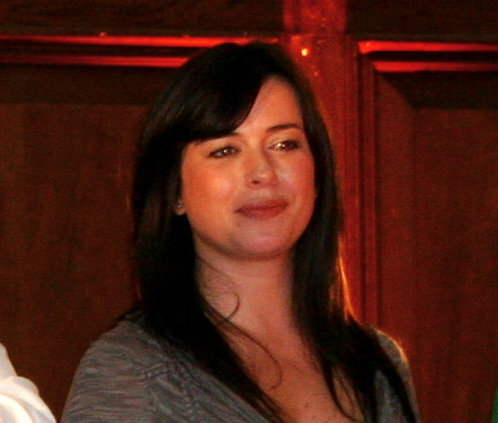
"The Dragon's Call" guest-starred Eve Myles, who enjoyed playing the villain.

The producers were aware that they would be casting young actors with little experience in film and television. Hundreds were seen for the part of Merlin, with the part going to 22-year-old Colin Morgan, whom Murphy and Capps felt possessed a broad acting range with good comedic timing and wonder, and who they felt would most importantly be likable to the audience. Bradley James was cast as Prince Arthur, whom the producers saw as a "medieval Prince Harry". They felt that James' sense of comedy balanced the fact that the character was intended to first appear acting like an "idiot". Murphy and Capps had previously worked with James on a pilot, and kept him in the "back of [their] minds" when casting Arthur. Katie McGrath and Angel Coulby, who play Morgana and Gwen respectively, also had little previous professional acting experience. Despite this, it was noted that all four young actors took to their jobs maturely and with energy.

The series also incorporates more experienced and well-known actors. Richard Wilson was cast as Gaius, who was conceived to have a dysfunctional father/son relationship with Merlin. Murphy and Capps had worked with Wilson before and considered him a broad actor with a "warmth" and "humanity" that would fit the character. The voice of the Great Dragon was given to John Hurt; he was offered the part, though the producers did not expect him to accept. The role of King Uther went to veteran actor Anthony Head, who was best known for his role as Rupert Giles in Buffy the Vampire Slayer. Head had been one of the first choices for the part; Murphy and Capps felt that he was good with "high-concept" worlds. Murphy and Capps had also previously worked with Caroline Faber, who briefly appears as Merlin's mother. The two liked her sense of humanity, though her scene — where Gaius reads her letter — was almost cut from "The Dragon's Call". Eve Myles guest stars in "The Dragon's Call" as the villain Mary Collins and her host body Lady Helen. Murphy and Capps remarked that Myles gave a "big" but "truthful" performance, and really "embraced" being a villain. Myles sang during the filming of the climax, though her voice was replaced with a real operatic soprano in post-production. Composer Rob Lane was given little time to complete the song and, though he was given Old English texts, the lyrics do not make actual sense.

=== Filming ===
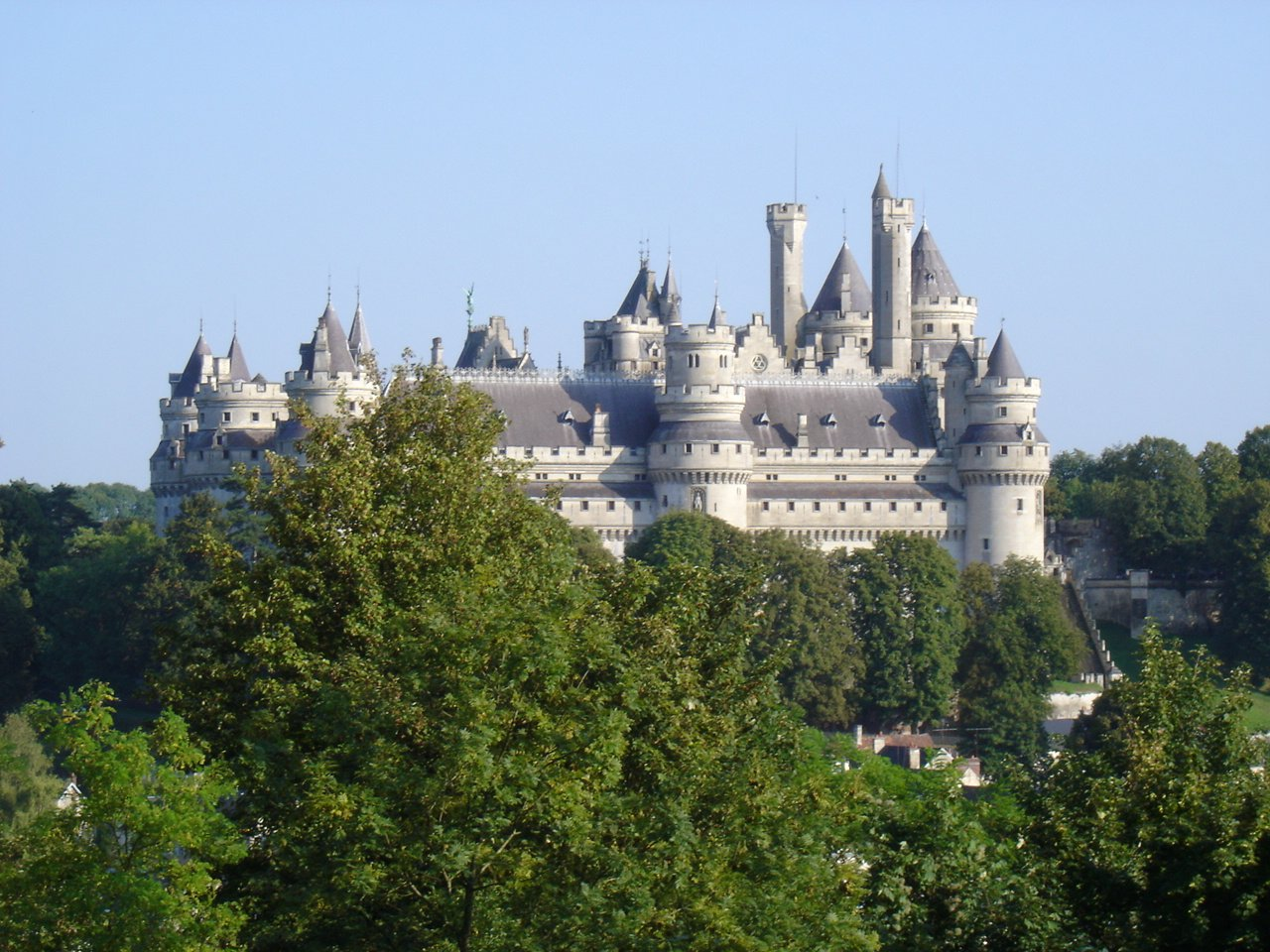
The Château de Pierrefonds in France was used for filming Camelot scenes.

Merlin began production in March 2008; as many as three episodes were filmed at a time, and not necessarily in the correct order. Many scenes in Camelot were filmed in France at the Château de Pierrefonds, which was hand-picked by the production team. Castles in England had been looked at, but they were often in ruins and would require more computer-generated imagery (CGI) effects in post-production. A medieval-era road was built around Pierrefonds for some scenes to give the sense of a town, as the castle was in isolation. The execution scene was one of the first major scenes shot. As the production team had to be able to work with French extras, a bilingual crew was required. The cell Merlin is imprisoned in and the banquet hall at the end were both filmed in English stately homes, with real medieval architecture. Other studio filming took place in Wales. The scene at the camp where Lady Helen stays had to be reshot because the tent was seen as "too Monty Python" and distracting.

Myles' Mary Collins prosthetic took six hours to accomplish, and the shot where she morphs into the younger Lady Helen took seven hours to complete because it required three stages of make-up. Her first performance at the beheading scene was met with applause by the extras; Head requested that he redo his part of the scene because he felt that it was not good enough. Gaius' fall from the balcony was done by a stuntman and filmed with a high-speed camera. The mattress that Merlin magically moves across the floor was achieved with rigging it up to hidden wires and pulleys under the set. The knives Arthur throws were actually shot out of a nitrogen gun; James did throw them in a separate shot, but against a cloth that he still missed. Fake fruit was made for the stocks scene, but it was deemed too fake-looking and was replaced with real tomatoes. The mace fight was originally filmed with plastic maces, but they were not believable as they did not have enough weight. The scene was then shot with real steel maces; it was one of the most complex and hardest scenes to execute. The climax, where the guests all fall asleep and are covered by cobwebs, took many days to complete. The chandelier falling was also considered difficult.

CGI special effects for the series were provided by The Mill. The production team wanted a talking dragon, but they were worried about the lip sync and did not think it would be believable until they saw the first test. The Mill created a software that would read Hurt's facial muscles and incorporated it into the animation. Another concern was that the eyes would not convey the character, but this was corrected by the final version. Additional sound effects, such as the clanging chain, were added to give the creature weight. The knife Mary throws at Arthur was also completely CGI, though the shot of it hitting the chair was real.

== Broadcast and reception ==
"The Dragon's Call" was first broadcast on BBC One in the United Kingdom on 20 September 2008. Overnight ratings showed that the episode had been watched by 6.65 million viewers live, a 30% audience share, placing Merlin second for the night behind ITV's The X-Factor. The episode received a final rating of 7.15 million viewers, the sixth most-watched programme of the week on BBC One.

In the United States, "The Dragon's Call" was aired back-to-back with the following episode "Valiant" on 21 June 2009 on network station NBC, the first time since 1978's The New Avengers that a British programme was picked up by one of the U.S.'s four major terrestrial networks, rather than cable. The premiere was watched by an average 5.2 million viewers, with an average of 6.3 million during the slot for "The Dragon's Call".

=== Critical reception ===
The entire build up to [the climax] is bizarre at times, because it’s like they couldn’t decide if this was mythology or a fairytale. Parallels are drawn with Snow White, like that's meant to be relevant somehow. Other scenes are supposedly comic, accompanied with some of the campest incidental music that could have been borrowed from a Carry-On movie. This hints at the mishmash that is Merlin, it's all over the place. One minute it's legend, then slapstick, then panto, then drama, horror and then mystery [...].

— Den of Geek's Mark Pickavance on the episode's inconsistency.

The premiere of Merlin received generally mixed reviews. Sam Wollaston of The Guardian was optimistic towards the programme, despite the violent content. He wrote that "Morgan is a very likable young Merlin" and the show "looks splendid — colourful, exciting, and yes, magic". Daniel Martin of the same paper felt that the series had potential, though "The Dragon's Call" had "awful dialogue" and was "a flimsy caper memorable only for centring around the wonderful big-eyed Eve Myles". The Hollywood Reporter reviewer Randee Dawn felt that it would "hurt [the] eyes" of those who were familiar with the Arthurian legends, but "for those new to the legend, this is a fresh, and delightfully color-blind, approach to the tale". Alessandra Stanley, reviewing for The New York Times, was pleased with the diversity of the cast and the chemistry between Morgan and James, though she felt it "would be better if its creators had taken more liberties and shown more imagination in coloring in the background of their young hero's world".

Metro gave the episode three out of five stars, writing that "Colin Morgan makes a likeable boy wizard but there’s a bit too much formula – and not in the magical sense". The review described the episode as a "test of patience" due to Merlin's inability to use magic and the "hideously jaunty, distinctly non-medieval soundtrack". Tom Shales of The Washington Post criticised the "sluggish pace" of the premiere, noting that the episode was only "brightened" by the dragon, though similar creatures were common in the genre and it "lacks personality as well as panache". Shales felt that the series took "the stuff of legend and imagination and makes it dry and commonplace". Den of Geek reviewer Mark Pickavance felt that the episode was "uneven and often very stilted", and failed at introducing both the characters and telling the story of the first meeting of Arthur and Merlin. He was displeased with the deviation from established mythology and the lapses in logic. The Times's AA Gill described Merlin as "bland", writing that it was for "a large untapped audience that yearns for Abercrombie & Fitch drama". Hermione Eyre of The Independent called it "horrible", disliking the "modern" feeling, the "awful" make-up, and commented that "Guinevere looks like a supply teacher".
