= Mark Faber =

English cricketer

Personal information
- Full name: Mark James Julian Faber
- Born: 15 August 1950; Horsted Keynes, Sussex, England
- Died: 10 December 1991 (aged 41); Marylebone, London, England
- Batting: Right-handed
- Bowling: Right-arm medium
- Relatives: Julian Faber (father); David Faber (brother); Harold Macmillan (grandfather)

Domestic team information
- Years: Team
- 1970–1972: Oxford University
- 1973–1976: Sussex

Career statistics
Competition	FC	List A
Matches	78	59
Runs scored	3009	1123
Batting average	22.12	21.18
100s/50s	3/13	0/6
Top score	176	86
Balls bowled	112	1
Wickets	1	0
Bowling average	66.00	–
5 wickets in innings	–	–
10 wickets in match	–	n/a
Best bowling	1/11	–
Catches/stumpings	42/–	12/–
- Source: ESPNcricinfo, 16 November 2015

Mark James Julian Faber (15 August 1950 – 10 December 1991) was an English cricketer who played for Oxford University and Sussex from 1970 to 1976.

Faber attended Summer Fields School. He appeared in 78 first-class matches as a right-handed batsman. He scored 3,009 runs with a highest score of 176 among three centuries.

In 1976, Faber requested a release from his contract to join his family's insurance business.

Faber died in 1991 from complications following a leg operation (from an old cricket injury during the early 1980s).
