= Rutherford model =

1911 theoretical description of an atom

The Rutherford model is the name for the idea that an atom contains a compact nucleus. The concept arose after Ernest Rutherford directed the Geiger–Marsden experiment in 1909, which showed much more alpha particle recoil than J. J. Thomson's plum pudding model of the atom could explain. Thomson's model had positive charge spread out in the atom. Rutherford's analysis proposed a high central charge concentrated into a very small volume in comparison to the rest of the atom and with this central volume containing most of the atom's mass. The central region would later be known as the atomic nucleus. Rutherford did not discuss the organization of electrons in the atom and did not himself propose a model for the atom. Niels Bohr joined Rutherford's lab and developed a theory for the electron motion which became known as the Bohr model.

== Background ==
Throughout the 1800s, speculative ideas about atoms were discussed and published. JJ Thomson's model was the first of these models to be based on experimentally detected subatomic particles. In the same paper that Thomson announced his results on "corpuscle" nature of cathode rays, an event considered the discovery of the electron, he began speculating on atomic models composed of electrons. He developed his model, now called the plum pudding model, primarily in 1904–06. He produced an elaborate mechanical model of the electrons moving in concentric rings, but the positive charge needed to balance the negative electrons was a simple sphere of uniform charge and unknown composition. Between 1904 and 1910 Thomson developed formulae for the deflection of fast beta particles from his atomic model for comparison to experiment. Similar work by Rutherford using alpha particles would eventually show Thomson's model could not be correct.

Also among the early models were "planetary" or Solar System-like models. In a 1901 paper, Jean Baptiste Perrin used Thomson's discovery in a proposed a Solar System like model for atoms, with very strongly charged "positive suns" surrounded by "corpuscles, a kind of small negative planets", where the word "corpuscles" refers to what we now call electrons. Perrin discussed how this hypothesis might related to important then unexplained phenomena like the photoelectric effect, emission spectra, and radioactivity. Perrin later credited Rutherford with the discovery of the nuclear model.

A somewhat similar model proposed by Hantaro Nagaoka in 1904 used Saturn's rings as an analog. The rings consisted of a large number of particles that repelled each other but were attracted to a large central charge. This charge was calculated to be 10,000 times the charge of the ring particles for stability. George A. Schott showed in 1904 that Nagaoka's model could not be consistent with results of atomic spectroscopy and the model fell out of favor.

== Experimental basis for the model ==
Rutherford's nuclear model of the atom grew out of a series of experiments with alpha particles, a form of radiation Rutherford discovered in 1899. These experiments demonstrated that alpha particles "scattered" or bounced off atoms in ways unlike Thomson's model predicted. In 1908 and 1910, Hans Geiger and Ernest Marsden in Rutherford's lab showed that alpha particles could occasionally be reflected from gold foils. If Thomson was correct, the beam would go straight through the gold foil. Most of the beam particles went through the foil, but a few were deflected.

In a May 1911 paper, Rutherford presented his own physical model for subatomic structure, as an interpretation for the unexpected experimental results. In it, the atom is made up of a central charge (this is the modern atomic nucleus, though Rutherford did not use the term "nucleus" in his paper). Rutherford only committed himself to a small central region of very high positive or negative charge in the atom.

For concreteness, consider the passage of a high speed α particle through an atom having a positive central charge N e, and surrounded by a compensating charge of N electrons.

Using only energetic considerations of how far particles of known speed would be able to penetrate toward a central charge of 100 e, Rutherford was able to calculate that the radius of his gold central charge would need to be less (how much less could not be told) than 3.4 × 10^{−14} meters. This was in a gold atom known to be 10^{−10} metres or so in radius—a very surprising finding, as it implied a strong central charge less than 1/3000th of the diameter of the atom.

The Rutherford model served to concentrate a great deal of the atom's charge and mass to a very small core, but did not attribute any structure to the remaining electrons and remaining atomic mass. It did mention the atomic model of Hantaro Nagaoka, in which the electrons are arranged in one or more rings, with the specific metaphorical structure of the stable rings of Saturn. The plum pudding model of J. J. Thomson also had rings of orbiting electrons.

The Rutherford paper suggested that the central charge of an atom might be "proportional" to its atomic mass in hydrogen mass units (approximately one dalton) (roughly 1/2 of it, in Rutherford's model). For gold, this mass number is 197 (not then known to great accuracy) and was therefore modelled by Rutherford to be possibly 196 u. However, Rutherford did not attempt to make the direct connection of central charge to atomic number, since gold's "atomic number" (at that time merely its place number in the periodic table) was 79, and Rutherford had modelled the charge to be about +100 units (he had actually suggested 98 units of positive charge, to make half of 196). Thus, Rutherford did not formally suggest the two numbers (periodic table place, 79, and nuclear charge, 98 or 100) might be exactly the same.

In 1913 Antonius van den Broek suggested that the nuclear charge and atomic weight were not connected, clearing the way for the idea that atomic number and nuclear charge were the same. This idea was quickly taken up by Rutherford's team and was confirmed experimentally within two years by Henry Moseley.

These are the key indicators:

- The atom's electron cloud does not (substantially) influence alpha particle scattering.
- Much of an atom's positive charge is concentrated in a relatively tiny volume at the center of the atom, known today as the nucleus. The magnitude of this charge is proportional to (up to a charge number that can be approximately half of) the atom's atomic mass—the remaining mass is now known to be mostly attributed to neutrons. This concentrated central mass and charge is responsible for deflecting both alpha and beta particles.
- The mass of heavy atoms such as gold is mostly concentrated in the central charge region, since calculations show it is not deflected or moved by the high speed alpha particles, which have very high momentum in comparison to electrons, but not with regard to a heavy atom as a whole.
- The atom itself is about 100,000 (10^{5}) times the diameter of the nucleus. This could be related to putting a grain of sand in the middle of a football field.

== Contribution to modern science ==
Rutherford's new atom model caused no reaction at first. Rutherford explicitly ignores the electrons, only mentioning Hantaro Nagaoka's Saturnian model. By ignoring the electrons Rutherford also ignores any potential implications for atomic spectroscopy for chemistry. Rutherford himself did not press the case for his atomic model in the following years: his own 1913 book on "Radioactive substances and their radiations" only mentions the atom twice; other books by other authors around this time focus on Thomson's model.

The impact of Rutherford's nuclear model came after Niels Bohr arrived as a post-doctoral student in Manchester at Rutherford's invitation. Bohr dropped his work on the Thomson model in favor of Rutherford's nuclear model, developing the Rutherford–Bohr model over the next several years. Eventually Bohr incorporated early ideas of quantum mechanics into the model of the atom, allowing prediction of electronic spectra and concepts of chemistry.

After Rutherford's discovery, subsequent research refined the understanding of the atomic core. Scientists eventually discovered that atoms have a positively charged nucleus varying in size from 2 femtometres for hydrogen to 7 femtometres for uranium. Electrons were found to be even smaller.
