= Antonius van den Broek =

Dutch physicist (1870–1926)

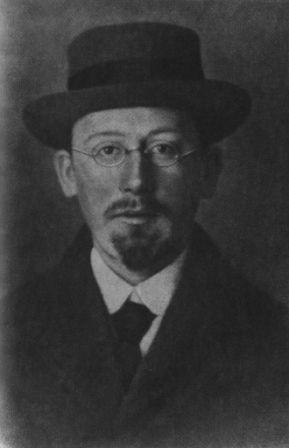
- Born: 4 May 1870; Zoetermeer, Netherlands
- Died: 26 October 1926 (aged 56); Bilthoven, Netherlands
- Education: Leiden University; Sorbonne University
- Known for: Identifying the atomic number of a chemical element with the charge of the nucleus
- Scientific career
- Fields: Mathematical economics Atomic physics

Antonius Johannes van den Broek (4 May 1870 – 25 October 1926) was a Dutch mathematical economist and amateur physicist, notable for being the first who realized that the position of an element in the periodic table (now called atomic number) corresponds to the charge of its atomic nucleus. This hypothesis was published in 1911 and inspired the experimental work of Henry Moseley, who found good experimental evidence for it by 1913.

== Life ==
Van den Broek was the son of a civil law notary and trained to be a lawyer himself. He studied at Leiden University and at the Sorbonne in Paris, obtaining a degree in 1895 in Leiden. From 1895 to 1900 he held a lawyers office in The Hague until 1900, after which he studied mathematical economy in Vienna and Berlin. However, from 1903 on, his main interest was physics. Much of the time between 1903 and 1911 he lived in France and Germany. Most of his papers he wrote between 1913 and 1916 while living in Gorssel. He married Elisabeth Margaretha Mauve in 1906, with whom he had five children.

== Major contribution to science ==
The idea of the direct correlation of the charge of the atom nucleus and the periodic table was contained in his paper published in Nature on 20 July 1911, just one month after Ernest Rutherford published the results of his experiments that showed the existence of a small charged nucleus in an atom (see Rutherford model). However, Rutherford's original paper noted only that the charge on the nucleus was large, on the order of about half of the atomic weight of the atom, in whole number units of hydrogen mass. Rutherford on this basis made the tentative suggestion that atomic nuclei are composed of numbers of helium nuclei, each with a charge corresponding to half of its atomic weight. This consideration would make the nuclear charge nearly equal to atomic number in smaller atoms, with some deviation from this rule for the largest atoms, such as gold. For example, Rutherford found the charge on gold to be about 100 units and thought perhaps that it might be exactly 98 (which would be close to half its atomic weight). But gold's place in the periodic table (and thus its atomic number) was known to be 79.

Thus Rutherford did not make the proposal that the number of charges in the nucleus of an atom might be exactly equal to its place on the periodic table (atomic number). This hypothesis was put forward by Van den Broek. The number of the place of an element in the periodic table (or atomic number) at that time was not thought by most physicists to be a physical property. It was not until the work of Henry Moseley working with the Bohr model of the atom with the explicit idea of testing Van den Broek's hypothesis, that it was realized that atomic number was indeed a purely physical property (the charge of the nucleus) which could be measured, and that Van den Broek's original guess had been correct, or very close to being correct. Moseley's work actually found (see Moseley's law) the nuclear charge best described by the Bohr equation and a charge of Z-1, where Z is the atomic number.

Henry Moseley, in his paper on atomic number and X-ray emission, mentions only the models of Rutherford and Van den Broek.
