= Effective atomic number =

Effective atomic number, denoted by Z_{eff}, may refer to:

- Effective nuclear charge of an individual atom, as felt by electrons within that atom
- Effective atomic number (compounds and mixtures) of a composite material
