= Summerfields, St Leonards-on-Sea =

Defunct school in East Sussex, England

Coordinates: 50.858°N 0.567°E

Summerfields was a boys' preparatory school in the St Leonards-on-Sea area of Hastings, East Sussex. It occupied the buildings previously known as Bohemia House.

Bohemia House was built in 1818, by the architect John (Yorky) Smith, and occupied the site of the former demolished Bohemia Farm, which has given its name to Bohemia Road, and the whole area known as Bohemia.

The first owner of the house was G. N. Collingwood, a son-in-law of Admiral Collingwood. It was re-developed in the Jacobean architecture style in 1824 and Princess Sophia of Gloucester stayed there during the summer of 1830.

In 1831, the house and estate was put up for sale. The building was later sold to Wastel Brisco who purchased the house for £8500. Wastel was the younger brother of Musgrave Brisco, the MP and mayor of Hastings in 1842. The estate had North and South Lodges. The North Lodge was located opposite 220 Bohemia Road (the current site of the fire station).

In 1903 the house was leased by Dr C. H. Williams, headmaster of Summer Fields School, Oxford, and the name was changed accordingly. The school was known as "Summers mi" and during the Second World War was relocated to Summer Fields in Oxford.

During the Second World War the house was used as the local town hall. The school closed in 1966 and the site was bought by Hastings Borough Council. The house was demolished in 1972.

Part of the site was used for the new police station and fire brigade headquarters, and the name is now perpetuated by a hotel.

== Notable pupils ==
- David Greville, 8th Earl of Warwick (1934–1996)
- Rainier III of Monaco (1923–2005)
