= Julian Faber =

British businessman (1917–2002)

Julian Tufnell Faber (6 April 1917 – 11 January 2002) was a leading figure in the insurance business.

== Early life ==
He was educated at Winchester College and Trinity College, Cambridge. He served with the Welsh Guards during the Second World War. He retired as a Major.

== Career ==
He joined the family firm of Willis, Faber & Dumas (later Willis Corroon) in 1938 (later rising to chairman). He later served as chairman of Cornhill Insurance and he was responsible for sponsoring English Test Cricket for a long period from 1978.

== Family life ==
He married Caroline Macmillan, a daughter of Harold Macmillan and Lady Dorothy Cavendish, a daughter of the 9th Duke of Devonshire. They had five children:

- 1) Anne Cristine Adriane Faber (born 1944). Married firstly in 1970 Michael Roger Lewis Cockerell, two children, married secondly in 1995 The Hon. David Bernstein.
- 2) Michael David Tufnell Faber (born 1945). Married Catherine Suzanne de Braine, two children.
- 3) Mark James Julian Faber (1950-1991), a Sussex cricketer. Married in 1983 Ann Griffith, three sons.
- 4) David James Christian Faber (born 1961), a Conservative politician and an MCC Committee member.
- 5) James Edwin Charles Faber (born 1964)

== Death and legacy ==
He died in January 2002, aged 84, and Caroline outlived him.
