= Lady Caroline Faber =

Daughter of British prime minister Harold Macmillan (1923–2016)

- Born: Ann Caroline Macmillan; 29 August 1923; Belgravia, London, England
- Died: 14 September 2016 (aged 93); Sussex, England
- Education: West Heath Girls' School
- Spouse: Julian Faber (m. 1944; died 2002)
- Children: 5, including Mark Faber and David Faber
- Parent(s): Harold Macmillan; Lady Dorothy Macmillan
- Relatives: Victor Cavendish, 9th Duke of Devonshire (maternal grandfather); Lady Evelyn Petty-Fitzmaurice (maternal grandmother); Edward Cavendish, 10th Duke of Devonshire (maternal uncle); William Cavendish, Marquess of Hartington (cousin); Andrew Cavendish, 11th Duke of Devonshire (cousin); Lady Elizabeth Cavendish (cousin); Lady Anne Tree (cousin); Lord Charles Cavendish (maternal uncle); Maurice Macmillan (brother); Alexander Macmillan, 2nd Earl of Stockton (nephew)

Lady Ann Caroline Faber (née Macmillan; 29 August 1923 – 14 September 2016) was an English aristocrat, political campaigner and philanthropist. She was the daughter of British Prime Minister Harold Macmillan.

== Biography ==
Ann Caroline Macmillan was born on 1923 at 14 Chester Square, Belgravia, London. Her father was the British Prime Minister Harold Macmillan (created Earl of Stockton in 1984). Her mother was Lady Dorothy Macmillan, daughter of Victor Cavendish, 9th Duke of Devonshire. She was the second of her parents' four children, and their last surviving child.

Macmillan attended West Heath Girls' School, where she was offered a place to study medicine at the University of Oxford. She declined the offer but served as an ambulance driver in World War II, during which time she met her future husband, insurance executive Julian Tufnell Faber. He was then an officer in the Welsh Guards.

They were married from 1944 until Faber's death in January 2002. They had five children:

- Anne Christine Adriane Faber (1944 – 28 November 2002). In 1970, she married firstly to British broadcaster and journalist Michael Roger Lewis Cockerell (b. 1940), son of Hugh Anthony Lewis Cockerell and Fanny Jochelman. They had a son and a daughter before divorcing in 1980. In 1995, she married secondly to Hon. David Sidney Bernstein, son of British businessman and media executive Sidney Lewis Bernstein, Baron Bernstein and his wife Sandra Alexandra Malone, by whom she had no further issue.
- Michael David Tufnell Faber (born 1945). Married, to Catherine Feber) and has issue.
- Mark James Julian Faber ((15 August 1950 – 10 December 1991), a Sussex cricketer. Married Ann Griffith, and had issue.
- David James Christian Faber (born 7 July 1961), Conservative politician and a former committee member of the Marylebone Cricket Club. He married firstly to Sally Gilbert and secondly to Sophie Amanda Hedley.
- James Edwin Charles Faber (born 1964).

The family lived at Birch Grove, the Macmillan home in East Sussex and at Chester Square in London.

Caroline disliked politics but supported the political campaigns of her family members, including her brother Maurice Macmillan and son David Faber, and carried out charity work for the National Blind Children's Society.

She died in Sussex on 14 September 2016 at the age of 93, and her funeral was held at Chelsea Old Church, Cheyne Walk, London later that month.

== Arms ==
Coat of arms of Lady Caroline Faber
Escutcheon Argent a chief Or overall between three open books Proper edged Or and bound Azure those in chief inscribed respectively in letters Sable "Miseres" and "Discere" and that in base also in letters Sable inscribed "Succo" and as many mullets Azure a lion rampant Sable.
