= Michael Cockerell =

British broadcaster and journalist

- Born: Michael Roger Lewis Cockerell; 26 August 1940 (age 86)
- Education: Heidelberg University; Corpus Christi College, Oxford
- Occupations: Political documentary maker, author, broadcaster
- Employer: BBC Current Affairs (1968–87)
- Spouses: Anne Faber (m. 1970; div. 1980) Bridget Heathcoat-Amory (m. 1984; div. 1990) Anna Lloyd (m. 2011)

Michael Roger Lewis Cockerell (born 26 August 1940) is a British broadcaster and journalist. He is the BBC's most established political documentary maker, with a long, Emmy award-winning career of political programmes spanning television and radio.

== Early life and education ==
Michael Roger Lewis Cockerell was born on 26 August 1940. His father was Professor Hugh Anthony Lewis Cockerell, OBE, Secretary General of the Chartered Insurance Institute, a professor who was an expert on insurance law, and his mother, Fanny Cockerell (née Jochelman), was an author and playwright, and daughter of Dr. David Solomon Jochelman, a prominent leader of the British Jewish community. He was educated at Kilburn Grammar School, Heidelberg University and Corpus Christi College, Oxford where he studied Philosophy, Politics and Economics (receiving a BA degree in 1962, and an MA degree in 1968).

== Career ==
From 1962 to 1966, Cockerell worked as a magazine journalist. He then joined the BBC Africa service, working as a producer there from 1966 to 1968. From 1968 to 1987, Cockerell worked in the BBC's Current Affairs department. He was initially a producer for the 24 Hours series from 1968 to 1972, from which he moved to being a reporter for Midweek (1972–75). In 1975, he became a reporter on the flagship news series Panorama, where he remained until 1987. That year, he became a freelance television reporter and documentary maker.

He has latterly specialised in in-depth documentaries on the politics of Westminster. He has made biographical profiles of Margaret Thatcher (The Making of the Iron Lady, 2008), Edward Heath (Sir Ted: A Film Portrait of Edward Heath, 2005), Alan Clark, Barbara Castle, Roy Jenkins (A Very Social Democrat: A Portrait of Roy Jenkins, 1996), Michael Howard, David Cameron, Denis Healey (The Best Prime Minister Labour Never Had?, 2015) and most recently, Boris Johnson (The Irresistible Rise).

From the 1970s onwards, his work for television has included How We Fell For Europe (2005), The Lost World of the Seventies (2012), The Marketing of Margaret Thatcher (1983), Blair's Thousand Days – The Lady and the Lords (2000), Life in Whips Office (1995), Inside 10 Downing Street (2000) and Cabinet Confidential (2001).

He has also made multi-part series', among them the How to Be trilogy (How to Be Chancellor, 2010, How to Be Foreign Secretary, 1998 and How to Be Home Secretary, 1999); a three-part series on the history of Anglo-American, Anglo-German and Anglo-French relations; an observational documentary on the workings of Alastair Campbell's press office in News from Number 10; and a three-part analysis of Tony Blair's 10 years in office as Prime Minister. He also followed up the How to Be series, with How to Be Ex Prime Minister (2007), broadcast just before Blair's resignation. The programme was repeated upon the departure from office of Theresa May in 2019.

Cockerell's 2010 series The Great Offices of State was a behind-the-scenes look at the Home Office, the Foreign Office, and the UK Treasury, three of the UK's Great Offices of State. This was followed by the 2011 series The Secret World of Whitehall. He also made the four-part series Inside the Commons for the BBC, broadcast in 2015, for which had sought permission for six years.

In the run-up to the May 2010 election, Cockerell was responsible for a documentary entitled How to Win the TV Debate, in which he discussed the importance of Britain's first television debates in the outcome of the general election. The programme featured candid interviews with US presidents and their advisers on debate strategy.

Cockerell has interviewed eight Prime Ministers – more than any other reporter in British political broadcasting. Prior to the invasion of Iraq in 2003, he interviewed Tony Blair for a documentary on Britain's relationship with the United States, Hotline to the President. That interview was widely reported on the front pages of British newspapers when Blair accepted that the need to sustain the transatlantic 'special relationship' meant a willingness to 'pay the blood price'. Cockerell has contributed shorter profiles to Newsnight, such as Who is Ed Miliband? and Theresa May's legacy.

Alongside his television work, Cockerell has also been responsible for several BBC Radio 4 documentaries, including The Trial of David Irving, about the court case involving Holocaust denier David Irving (2004) and Tales from the Cutting Room (2006). Cockerell contributed Profile episodes on Conrad Black (2007, 2010) and Speaker of the House of Commons Michael Martin (2008).

Since 2011, Cockerell has been visiting professor of Politics at Nottingham University. He became a visiting lecturer at the London School of Economics in 1998, and carried out the same role at Nuffield College, Oxford, from 2001 to 2004. In 2000, Cockerell delivered the Huw Wheldon Lecture for BBC Two. He has been a consultant to the Oxford Dictionary of National Biography since 2000.

In 2021, Cockerell's book, Unmasking Our Leaders: Confessions of a Political Documentary-Maker, was published by Biteback, to acclaim from reviewers.

== Personal life ==
Cockerell has been married three times and has seven children. He first married Anne Christine Adriane Faber (1944–28 November 2002) in 1970; they divorced in 1980. Faber was the eldest child and only daughter of Julian Faber and his wife Lady Caroline Faber (née Macmillan), a daughter of Harold Macmillan. Cockerell and Faber had one son and one daughter.

His second marriage, in 1984, was to Bridget Alexandra Heathcoat-Amory (born 21 May 1952), daughter of Brigadier Roderick Heathcoat-Amory and his wife Sonia Myrtle Heathcoat-Amory (née Denison). Cockerell and Heathcoat-Amory. They had two daughters. In 1990, they divorced.

In 2011, Cockerell married BBC producer Anna Lloyd, with whom he has three daughters; the couple live in Notting Hill.

Michael's daughter Rachel Cockerell is the author of the highly acclaimed nonfiction book Melting Point: Family, Memory and the Search for a Promised Land which, in part, describes her discovery of the accomplishments of her paternal great-grandfather Zionist leader and political activist David Jochelman. Besides being chairman and founder of the Federation of Jewish Relief Organizations of Great Britain and of the Polish Jewish Refugee Fund, Jochelman also served alongside Israel Zangwill in the Jewish Territorial Organization's successful settling of some 10,000 European Jews in Galveston, Texas in the early 20th Century..

Michel Cockerell lists his recreations in Who's Who as cricket, tennis and "merry-making". He is a playing member of the Marylebone Cricket Club, as well being a member of the Lord’s Taverners and the Bushmen Cricket Club.

== Awards and honours ==
Cockerell won an Emmy Award in 1980 for the Panorama episode "Who Killed Georgi Markov?". Cockerell has also been awarded the Royal Television Society's Best Documentary Award (1982), the Golden Nymph Award in Monte Carlo (1988), the Judges' Award for Special Contribution to Politics at the Political Studies Association (2008), and the James Cameron Special Award (2010).

In 2011, Cockerell was made an honorary fellow of his alma mater, Corpus Christi College, Oxford. He was awarded an honorary doctorate by the University of East Anglia in 2007.

== Filmography ==
=== 1970s ===
Original transmission	Title	Channel	Duration	Subject	Credit(s)
18 June 1971	24 Hours: "Mr Heath's Quiet Revolution"	BBC1	60 minutes	On the first anniversary of the Conservative Party's general election win, the programme looks at the "quiet and total revolution" promised by Prime Minister Edward Heath, and asks what difference he has made to our lives. Presented by Kenneth Allsop with Robert McKenzie.	Producer
12 July 1973	Midweek Special: "Our Oldest Ally"	BBC1	45 mins	On the 600th anniversary of Britain's alliance with Portugal, Prime Minister Marcelo Caetano visits next week. Michael Cockerell reports on Portugal now.	Reporter
9 January 1974	Midweek: "The Great Oil Rush"	BBC2	30 mins	During Britain's energy crisis, Michael Cockerell reports on the men getting the North Sea oil. He profiles exploration manager Matt Linning and the oil men who are working in the winter.	Correspondent
9 April 1974	Midweek	BBC1	45 mins	A year on from a Swiss mountain air crash in which 100 women from three Somerset villages died, Michael Cockerell reports on how their families have managed.	Correspondent
30 January 1975	Midweek	BBC1	25 mins	A report by Michael Cockerell on the campaign for the Conservative Party leadership election, in which the candidates are Edward Heath, Margaret Thatcher and Hugh Fraser.	Reporter
6 February 1975	Midweek Special: "The Detectives"	BBC1	50 mins	Michael Cockerell speaks to Scotland Yard detectives about the work they do. He also talks to Commissioner of the Metropolitan Police Sir Robert Mark.	Correspondent
15 May 1975	Midweek at the Market: "Law Unto Ourselves?"	BBC1	53 mins	Those in Brussels, Luxembourg and Strasbourg are making decisions and issuing directives which affect daily life in Britain in "fundamental ways". The programme asks if this is the end of sovereignty for Parliament, or Britain's chance for influence on the world. Other questions explored are how the European Union works, and whether Britain's institutions can shield us from Eurocrat bureaucracy.	Reporter
18 October 1976	Panorama: "Hungary Calling, Hungary Calling"	BBC1	50 mins	On the 20th anniversary of the uprising, Michael Cockerell reports on the legacy of the Hungarian revolution in November 1956. Panorama goes back to Budapest to speak to people who stayed in Hungary, discussing their recollection of 1956 and how they live now.	Reporter
13 June 1977	Panorama: "Under Surveillance"	BBC1	50 mins	Authorities in Czechoslovakia, as well as much of Eastern Europe, are trying to suppress the few "dissidents" willing to publicly criticise their regimes. Michael Cockerell secretly filmed in Prague for a report on the men behind Charter 77, a call for more human rights, and how the Czech secret police are trying to silence them. Interrupted and cut short by technical problems; first broadcast complete on World of Panorama (6 August 1979).	Reporter
3 October 1977	Panorama: "Mr Ambassador Jay"	BBC1	50 mins	Michael Cockerell reports on Peter Jay, the Prime Minister's son-in-law, who controversially became Ambassador to Washington.	Reporter
6 March 1978	Panorama: "Who Really Killed Kennedy?"	BBC1	50 mins	"Sensational new evidence" about the assassination of President Kennedy has recently surfaced. This report by Michael Cockerell report gathers "all the new facts together for the first time", including previously unseen television interviews with Kennedy's assassin, Lee Harvey Oswald, and Jack Ruby, who killed Oswald.	Reporter
10 April 1978	Panorama	BBC1	50 mins	In "Mr Cut Price", Michael Cockerell reports on Prices Minister Roy Hattersley, the man heading up the battle against inflation.	Reporter
19 June 1978	Panorama: "Chile's Watergate"	BBC1	50 mins	Five years after General Augusto Pinochet took over Chile in a military coup, his government has become "one of the most controversial in the world". Michael Cockerell reports on "Chile's own Watergate", a major political scandal, from Santiago.	Reporter
20 November 1978	Panorama: "The Battle of Printing House Square: Behind The Times"	BBC1	50 mins	Britain's oldest newspaper, The Times, and its sister paper, The Sunday Times, is set to disappear next week. The management has threatened to shut down if it cannot come to an agreement with the print unions. Michael Cockerell has been filming the clash between the two sides, going behind the scenes at Printing House Square.	Reporter
9 April 1979	Panorama: "Who Killed Georgi Markov?"	BBC1	50 mins	Those responsible for the death of the exiled Bulgarian broadcaster Georgi Markov are still being sought by Scotland Yard's Anti-Terrorist Squad. An investigation by Panorama into the "poisoned umbrella murder" has found "startling new evidence".	Reporter
12 November 1979	Panorama: "The Kennedy Challenge"	BBC1	50 mins	As Ted Kennedy seems likely to seek the American presidency, Michael Cockerell looks at Kennedy's style and political record, including the Chappaquiddick incident.	Reporter

=== 1980s ===
Original transmission	Title	Channel	Duration	Subject	Credit(s)
9 January 1980	War School: 1: "Kitson's Class"	BBC1	30 mins	In a four-part series, Michael Cockerell reports on the lives and training of young officers at the Army Staff College at Camberley. In this episode, they learn what it would be like to stage a counter-revolutionary campaign in mainland Britain.	Reporter
16 January 1980	War School: 2: "Officer Class"	BBC1	30 mins	The second episode in the series asks what kind of men will run the army of the future. They go to the D-Day beaches of Normandy.	Reporter
23 January 1980	War School: 3: "A Different Form of Death"	BBC1	30 mins	The officers learn about warfare with nuclear and chemical weapons. They also learn about the IRA.	Reporter
30 January 1980	War School: 4: "Tomorrow's War, Tomorrow's Generals?"	BBC1	30 mins	The young officers look ahead to their future and that of the army. In this episode, they find out about their next postings.	Reporter
17 March 1980	Panorama: "The Heart Changers"	BBC1	50 mins	In a year when there were more heart transplants than ever before, a report on the trend and a look at their cost.	Reporter
15 September 1980	Panorama: "The Chinese News Machine"	BBC1	50 mins	A report on how China is changing, including a look at how the People's Daily, the Chinese Communist Party paper, is made. A repeat on 3 August 1981 was "updated to cover recent events".	Reporter
27 October 1980	Panorama: "President Reagan?"	BBC1	50 mins	A week before the US presidential election, a report on the Republican candidate, former film actor Ronald Reagan, including interviews with his backers.	Reporter
6 April 1981	Panorama: "Gold and Diamonds - The Kremlin Connection"	BBC1	50 mins	The world's two biggest producers of gold and diamonds – communist Russia and white-ruled South Africa - may be politically opposed, but Panorama examines the possibility of a secret relationship between the two countries. Michael Cockerell reports on "the secret world of gold and diamonds and the strange bedfellows it makes."	Reporter
8 March 1982	Panorama: "Sources Close to the Prime Minister..."	BBC1	50 mins	An investigation into the influence which the government has on news reporting of how it runs the country.	Reporter
21 February 1983	Panorama: "The Hi-Tech Trail to Moscow"	BBC1	50 mins	Russian weapons contain components designed in the West, and Russia is undertaking an "intensive campaign of illegal purchase, smuggling and spying" in order to acquire Western technology. Michael Cockerell has traced the trail and spoken to the dealers.	Reporter
13 June 1983	Panorama: "The Marketing of Margaret"	BBC1	50 mins	Following the Conservatives' landslide victory at the previous week's general election, a report on the creation of prime minister Margaret Thatcher's image and how it was marketed.	Reporter
14 November 1983	Panorama: "The Sky-high Gamble"	BBC1	50 mins	A battle is on between Europe and America to sell the next generation of airliners, and Airbus requires hundreds of millions from the government to press ahead with its new plane.	Reporter
8 October 1984	Panorama: "Thatcher's Revolution: What Next?"	BBC1	50 mins	Amidst the backdrop of the Conservative Party Conference, Michael Cockerell explores what shape the Tories are in.	Presenter
5 November 1984	Panorama: "Four More Years?"	BBC1	50 mins	On the eve of the US presidential election, a report on how Americans have been deciding about President Ronald Reagan.	Reporter
9 September 1985	Panorama: "Doctor in a Hurry"	BBC1	50 mins	A profile of Social Democratic Party leader David Owen.	Reporter
12 November 1986	Television and Number 10: "Into the Torture Chamber"	BBC2	65 mins	The first of two films exploring the relationship between television and Britain's prime ministers, including Anthony Eden, Harold Macmillan and Harold Wilson.	Reporter
13 November 1986	Television and Number 10: "Full Circle"	BBC2	60 mins	The second part of the report into television's impact on politics and those at 10 Downing Street.	Reporter
20 July 1987	Panorama: "Britain's Amateur Justice System: A Jail Lottery?"	BBC1	40 mins	An investigation into the disparities in sentencing for petty crime in different parts of the country, when 98% of all criminal cases are dealt with by magistrates.	Presenter
26 April 1989	Power Behind the Throne	BBC2	60 mins	A profile of the former Deputy Prime Minister and Home Secretary, Conservative peer Willie Whitelaw.	Producer and reporter
27 July 1989	Timewatch: The Night of the Long Knives	BBC2	30 mins	Michael Cockerell looks at new evidence for the "Night of the Long Knives", when Prime Minister Harold Macmillan sacked his Chancellor of the Exchequer and a third of the rest of the Cabinet.	Presenter and producer
12 October 1989	Denis Healey - The Man Who Did the Dirty Work	BBC2	60 mins	A profile of former Defence Secretary, Chancellor of the Exchequer and Deputy Labour Leader Denis Healey, described as "the man who many people regard as the best Prime Minister Labour never had".	Presenter and producer

=== 1990s ===
Original transmission	Title	Channel	Duration	Subject	Credit(s)
26 February 1990	On the Line Special: "Innocents Abroad"	BBC2	50 mins	A report on the experience of Mike Gatting's cricket team, which had just finished playing a series of matches against the South African team, at a time when the country was ruled by apartheid.	Reporter
8 July 1990	The Passionate Peer	BBC2	50 mins	A portrait of Lord Hailsham, the Conservative politician who served under six successive party leaders, most recently as Lord Chancellor.	Reporter and producer
12 May 1991	Bunkum and Balderdash: A Film Portrait of Sir Bernard Ingham	BBC2	50 mins	Margaret Thatcher's controversial press secretary Sir Bernard Ingham is profiled, and speaks on television for the first time.	Interviewer
26 November 1991	Class Rule: 1: "We Are the Masters Now"	BBC2	40 mins	In this four-part series, the effect of the class system on British political life since the Second World War is examined. The first episode looks at the Labour government of 1945 to 1951.	Reporter and producer
3 December 1991	Class Rule: 2: "Never Had It So Good"	BBC2	40 mins	The second episode of the series explores the Conservatives' 13 years in power from 1951 to 1964.	Reporter and producer
10 December 1991	Class Rule: 3: "Workers' Playtime, 1964-79"	BBC2	40 mins	The third episode of the series, covering the premierships of Harold Wilson, Edward Heath and James Callaghan.	Presenter
17 December 1991	Class Rule: 4: "Towards a Classless Society?"	BBC2	40 mins	In the final part of the series, the programme looks at the years when Britain was governed by Margaret Thatcher and John Major.	Reporter and producer
25 April 1992	Labour's Last Premier	BBC2	60 mins	A profile of Jim Callaghan, who was, at the time of broadcast, Labour's last prime minister. Prior to that role, Callaghan had been Chancellor of the Exchequer, Home Secretary and Foreign Secretary.	Presenter and producer
26 September 1992	The Cecil Parkinson Story	BBC2	60 mins	In an "intimate film portrait", former Conservative Party Chairman and Cabinet minister Cecil Parkinson speaks to Michael Cockerell about the affair which forced him to resign, his political career, and his relationship with Margaret Thatcher.	Producer
6 June 1993	Love Tory: A Film Portrait of Alan Clark	BBC2	50 mins	A profile of Alan Clark, "the most colourful of Margaret Thatcher's ministers", who served as a junior minister in her government.	Reporter
9 January 1994	Dear Bill	BBC2	50 mins	Bill Deedes, a former Conservative Cabinet minister and editor of The Daily Telegraph, is profiled.	Reporter
19 June 1994	The Bloke Next Door: A Film Portrait of Ken Clarke	BBC2	50 mins	A profile of the Chancellor of the Exchequer and former Home Secretary Kenneth Clarke. According to Cockerell, Clarke was "the first serving cabinet minister to agree to be filmed watching past triumphs and gaffes."	Director
29 January 1995	The Red Queen: a Film Portrait of Barbara Castle	BBC2	50 mins	Labour peer Barbara Castle, who held several Cabinet positions, is profiled in the year of her 85th birthday.	Reporter
21 May 1995	Westminster's Secret Service	BBC2	60 mins	Michael Cockerell looks at the role of the Whips in Parliament and how they work.	Reporter
11 November 1995	Odd Man Out: a Portrait of Enoch Powell	BBC2	50 mins	A profile of Enoch Powell, a politician "regarded as the most controversial Tory of his time", who was sacked from the Shadow Cabinet after giving his "Rivers of Blood" speech.	Reporter
26 May 1996	A Very Social Democrat: A Portrait of Roy Jenkins	BBC2	55 mins	Labour's former Home Secretary and Chancellor of the Exchequer Roy Jenkins, who also led the Social Democratic Party as one of the "Gang of Four", is profiled.	Reporter
22 September 1996	How to Be Prime Minister	BBC2	50 mins	An exploration of the role of prime minister, featuring interviews with previous holders of the office.	Reporter
9 January 1997	A Word in the Right Ear	BBC2	50 mins	Michael Cockerell reports on the work of political lobbyists.	Reporter
29 June 1997	How to Be Chancellor	BBC2	50 mins	With the new Chancellor of the Exchequer Gordon Brown preparing to unveil his budget, Michael Cockerell presents a "guide" to the job, with recollections from seven former chancellors and archive film.	Presenter
19 July 1997	Labour's Old Romantic: a Film Portrait of Michael Foot	BBC2	50 mins	A profile of the left-wing former Leader of the Labour Party Michael Foot.	Reporter
4 January 1998	How to Be Foreign Secretary	BBC Two	50 mins	An exploration of the role of Foreign Secretary, featuring interviews with the present incumbent, Robin Cook, and six former holders of the post.	Presenter
27 September 1998	A Very Singular Man: A Film Portrait of Edward Heath	BBC Two	60 mins	Edward Heath, the former Conservative prime minister who took the United Kingdom into Europe, is profiled.	Reporter
24 January 1999	How to Be Home Secretary	BBC Two	50 mins	A guide to the job of Home Secretary, with contributions from the current office holder, Jack Straw, and past occupants of the role.	Presenter
19 June 1999	How to Be Leader of the Opposition	BBC Two	50 mins	A look at the role of Leader of the Opposition, featuring the incumbent, William Hague, and predecessors such as Margaret Thatcher and Tony Blair.	Presenter

=== 2000s ===
Original transmission	Title	Channel	Duration	Subject	Credit(s)
30 January 2000	Blair's Thousand Days: "What Makes Tony Tick"	BBC Two	50 mins	The first of two parts examining the premiership of Tony Blair. Michael Cockerell analyses what drives Blair, and his popularity with the electorate.	Presenter
6 February 2000	Blair's Thousand Days: "The Lady and the Lords"	BBC Two	60 mins	In the second part of Michael Cockerell's exploration of Tony Blair's time as prime minister, Cockerell tells the story of how Baroness Jay helped get the bill abolishing hereditary peers through Parliament.	Presenter
15 July 2000	News from Number Ten	BBC Two	80 mins	In this programme, filmed over the previous three months, Michael Cockerell explores the workings of New Labour's media operations under press secretary Alastair Campbell.	Presenter
11 December 2000	Trust Me, I'm the Prime Minister: The Royal Television Society Huw Wheldon Memorial Lecture	BBC Two	40 mins	Using archive clips, Michael Cockerell tells of how prime ministers have tried to use television to manipulate public opinion, and asks what lessons we might learn from the past.	Lecturer
16 December 2000	Call Me Madam	BBC Two	50 mins	A portrait of the first female Speaker of the House of Commons, Betty Boothroyd.	Interviewer
25 March 2001	The Rivals	BBC Two	50 mins	A profile of Chancellor of the Exchequer Gordon Brown and his Shadow Cabinet opponent, Michael Portillo.	Presenter
17 November 2001	Cabinet Confidential	BBC Two	60 mins	An examination of how Tony Blair and former prime ministers have run their Cabinet, with interviews and archive footage.	Presenter
1 December 2001	The Spying Dame	BBC Two	60 mins	A profile of Dame Stella Rimington, the first female head of MI5, giving her first ever television interview.	Interviewer
8 September 2002	Hotline to the President	BBC Two	60 mins	A history of the relationship between British prime ministers and American presidents, broadcast as part of a series of programmes marking the first anniversary of the 9/11 terrorist attacks.	Presenter
8 February 2003	Trust Me, I'm a Politician	BBC Two	60 mins	Michael Cockerell explores the high levels of public cynicism towards politicians and the reasons behind it. He speaks to figures such as Edwina Currie, Max Clifford, Geoffrey Robinson and Neil Hamilton.	Presenter
14 September 2003	With Friends Like These: "Affairs with the French"	BBC Two	60 mins	In the first of a three-part series exploring Britain's relationship with other countries, Michael Cockerell looks at the "uneasy alliance" between Britain and France.	Reporter
21 September 2003	With Friends Like These: "Don't Mention the War"	BBC Two	60 mins	Part two of the series explores the relationship between Britain and Germany.	Presenter
28 September 2003	With Friends like These: "Cowboys and Englishmen"	BBC Two	60 mins	The concluding part of the series examines Britain's relationship with America.	Presenter
29 February 2004	The Downing Street Patient	BBC Two	60 mins	A look at how medical professionals have collaborated with Downing Street spin doctors to conceal the state of the prime minister's health, from Winston Churchill to Tony Blair.	Reporter
25 September 2004	Do You Still Believe in Tony? Friends and Neighbours	BBC Two	105 mins	Two back-to-back reports marking Tony Blair's tenth anniversary as Leader of the Labour Party. In the first programme, Do You Still Believe in Tony?, Michael Cockerell speaks to figures from the world of the arts and media to ask if their faith in Blair has wavered. The second film, Friends and Neighbours, covers his relationship with his Chancellor, Gordon Brown.	Presenter
12 February 2005	Michael Howard: No More Mr Nasty	BBC Two	60 mins	Conservative Party leader Michael Howard is followed by Michael Cockerell for four months as he tries to rebrand himself and his party.	Presenter
4 June 2005	How We Fell for Europe	BBC Two	60 mins	The story of Britain's 1975 referendum on membership of the European Communities, which resulted in a 'Yes' vote.	Presenter
3 December 2005	How to Be a Tory Leader	BBC Two	60 mins	A week before the Conservatives choose between David Cameron and David Davis for party leader, Michael Cockerell fronts a guide to the role, at a time when the Tories were in opposition.	Presenter
11 February 2006	Tony's Tight Spot	BBC Two	50 mins	An investigation into Britain's six-month presidency of the European Union with Tony Blair at the helm.	
11 February 2006	The Cockerell Interviews - William Hague	BBC Parliament	30 mins	Michael Cockerell speaks to Shadow Foreign Secretary William Hague.	Interviewer
18 February 2006	The Cockerell Interviews - Iain Duncan Smith	BBC Parliament	30 mins	Michael Cockerell talks to former Conservative Party leader Iain Duncan Smith, who is now Chair of the Social Justice Policy Group.	Interviewer
20 February 2007	Blair: the Inside Story: "The New Leader"	BBC Two	60 mins	The first of three programmes in which Michael Cockerell charts ten years in power for New Labour and Prime Minister Tony Blair. This episode looks at the party's first term, from 1997 to 2001.	Reporter
27 February 2007	Blair: the Inside Story: "A Man with a Mission"	BBC Two	60 mins	The second programme examines Blair as war leader, and his relationship with President Bush.	Reporter
6 March 2007	Blair: the Inside Story: "The End of the Affair"	BBC Two	60 mins	In the final programme of the series, Michael Cockerell explores Blair's last years as prime minister.	Reporter
24 June 2007	How to Be an Ex-Prime Minister	BBC Four	60 mins	Following the departure of Tony Blair from high office, the story of what prime ministers have done after leaving 10 Downing Street.	Presenter
20 December 2007	Dave Cameron's Incredible Journey	BBC Two	60 mins	Behind the scenes of David Cameron's first two years as Conservative Party leader, featuring him in conversation with Michael Cockerell.	Presenter
8 June 2008	The Making of the Iron Lady	BBC Four	60 mins	The story of Margaret Thatcher's rise to the top, from entering the House of Commons in 1959 to becoming Britain's first female prime minister in 1979.	Presenter

=== 2010s ===
Original transmission	Title	Channel	Duration	Subject	Credit(s)
11 February 2010	The Great Offices of State: "The Dark Department"	BBC Four	60 mins	In the first episode of a three-part series looking at Whitehall, Michael Cockerell explores the Home Office.	Presenter, reporter and producer
18 February 2010	The Great Offices of State: "Palace of Dreams"	BBC Four	60 mins	The second episode of the series profiles the Foreign Office.	Presenter, reporter and producer
25 February 2010	The Great Offices of State: "The Secret Treasury"	BBC Four	60 mins	In the third and final episode, Michael Cockerell examines the Treasury.	Presenter, reporter and producer
12 April 2010	How to Win the TV Debate	BBC Two	60 mins	Prior to Britain's first ever television debate between political party leaders, Michael Cockerell reveals what it's like to take part in one, and the ways leaders attempt to "win" them.	Presenter
16 March 2011	The Secret World of Whitehall: "The Real Sir Humphrey"	BBC Four	60 mins	In the first of three episodes exploring Britain's Civil Service, Michael Cockerell profiles the role of Cabinet Secretary, "the most powerful unelected member of the government".	Presenter and producer
23 March 2011	The Secret World of Whitehall: "Behind the Black Door"	BBC Four	60 mins	The second episode in the series looks at 10 Downing Street.	Presenter and producer
30 March 2011	The Secret World of Whitehall: "The Network"	BBC Four	60 mins	In the third and final episode of the series, Michael Cockerell examines the cabinet minister's private office.	Presenter and producer
13 May 2012	The Lost World of the Seventies	BBC Two	60 mins	Michael Cockerell looks at some of the most controversial figures of the 1970s.	Presenter
25 March 2013	Boris Johnson: The Irresistible Rise	BBC Two	60 mins	A profile of Boris Johnson, the Mayor of London and "one of the biggest stars in British politics".	Reporter
8 April 2013	Campaign 1979	BBC Parliament	20 mins	Michael Cockerell's report from the 30 April 1979 edition of Panorama, in which he followed Margaret Thatcher on her election campaign.	Reporter
3 February 2015	Inside the Commons: "Lifting the Lid"	BBC Two	60 mins	Filmed over the course of a year, Michael Cockerell presents a series exploring the House of Commons. In the first episode, we follow two female MPs, Conservative Charlotte Leslie and Labour's Sarah Champion, who are learning how the Commons works.	Presenter
10 February 2015	Inside the Commons: "Upstairs, Downstairs"	BBC Two	60 mins	In the second episode looking at life in the House of Commons, we meet Conservative MP Robert Halfon and Thomas Docherty, a Labour MP.	Presenter
17 February 2015	Inside the Commons: "Party Games"	BBC Two	60 mins	The third episode of the series sees Michael Cockerell look at the difficulties faced by the three-party system, and follow Liberal Democrat MP Jenny Willott.	Presenter
24 February 2015	Inside the Commons: "Reinventing the House"	BBC Two	60 mins	The final part of the series sees conflict over the future of the House of Commons, with Speaker John Bercow attempting to reform it and Conservative MP Zac Goldsmith trying to allow voters to remove their MPs.	Presenter
27 March 2015	Exploring the House of Commons	BBC Two	60 mins	A programme of educational short films about the House of Commons, presented by Michael Cockerell.	Presenter
7 October 2015	Denis Healey: The Best Prime Minister Labour Never Had?	BBC Two	60 mins	Following the death of veteran Labour frontbencher Denis Healey, this programme profiles him.	Presenter
25 June 2016	BBC News Special	BBC World News	15 mins	A report on the rivalry between David Cameron and Boris Johnson, who respectively campaigned for Remain and Leave in the EU referendum.	Reporter

=== 2020s ===
Original transmission	Title	Channel	Duration	Subject	Credit(s)
3 September 2022	Boris Johnson: Departing Downing Street	BBC News	30 mins	As he leaves Downing Street, a look back at Boris Johnson's time as prime minister.	Presenter
11 September 2023	Edward Heath Remembered by Michael Cockerell	BBC Four	15 mins	Michael Cockerell recalls what it was like to deal with former Conservative prime minister Edward Heath, followed by a screening of Cockerell's 1998 profile of Heath.	Interviewed Guest
18 September 2023	Barbara Castle Remembered by Michael Cockerell	BBC Four	15 mins	The story of Michael Cockerell's meeting with long-serving Labour MP Barbara Castle, followed by a repeat of his 1995 portrait of Castle.	Interviewed Guest
25 September 2023	Roy Jenkins Remembered by Michael Cockerell	BBC Four	15 mins	Michael Cockerell introduces his 1996 portrait of Roy Jenkins, who served as Labour's Home Secretary in the 1960s.	Interviewed Guest

== Bibliography ==
- Sources Close to the Prime Minister with Peter Hennessy and David Walker (1984)
- Live from Number Ten: The Inside Story of Prime Ministers and TV (1988)
- The Blair Effect (editor: Anthony Seldon, 2001; contributor)
- Where the Truth Lies (editor: Julia Hobsbawm, 2006; contributor)
- Unmasking Our Leaders: Confessions of a Political Documentary-Maker (2021)
