= Effective atomic number (compounds and mixtures) =

Approximate atomic number calculated for materials with many elements

The atomic number of a material exhibits a strong and fundamental relationship with the nature of radiation interactions within that medium. There are numerous mathematical descriptions of different interaction processes that are dependent on the atomic number, Z. When dealing with composite media (i.e. a bulk material composed of more than one element), one therefore encounters the difficulty of defining Z. An effective atomic number in this context is equivalent to the atomic number but is used for compounds (e.g. water) and mixtures of different materials (such as tissue and bone). This is of most interest in terms of radiation interaction with composite materials. For bulk interaction properties, it can be useful to define an effective atomic number for a composite medium and, depending on the context, this may be done in different ways. Such methods include (i) a simple mass-weighted average, (ii) a power-law type method with some (very approximate) relationship to radiation interaction properties or (iii) methods involving calculation based on interaction cross sections. The latter is the most accurate approach (Taylor 2012), and the other more simplified approaches are often inaccurate even when used in a relative fashion for comparing materials.

In many textbooks and scientific publications, the following - simplistic and often dubious - sort of method is employed. One such proposed formula for the effective atomic number, Z_{eff}, is as follows:
$$Z_\text{eff} = \sqrt[2.94]{f_{1} \times (Z_{1})^{2.94} + f_{2} \times (Z_{2})^{2.94} + f_{3} \times (Z_{3})^{2.94} + \cdots}$$
where

- $f_n$ is the fraction of the total number of electrons associated with each element, and
- $Z_n$ is the atomic number of each element.

An example is that of water (H_{2}O), made up of two hydrogen atoms (Z=1) and one oxygen atom (Z=8), the total number of electrons is 1+1+8 = 10, so the fraction of electrons for the two hydrogens is (2/10) and for the one oxygen is (8/10). So the Z_{eff} for water is:

$$Z_\text{eff} = \sqrt[2.94]{0.2 \times 1^{2.94} + 0.8 \times 8^{2.94}} = 7.42$$

The effective atomic number is important for predicting how photons interact with a substance, as certain types of photon interactions depend on the atomic number. The exact formula, as well as the exponent 2.94, can depend on the energy range being used. As such, readers are reminded that this approach is of very limited applicability and may be quite misleading.

This 'power law' method, while commonly employed, is of questionable appropriateness in contemporary scientific applications within the context of radiation interactions in heterogeneous media. This approach dates back to the late 1930s when photon sources were restricted to low-energy x-ray units. The exponent of 2.94 relates to an empirical formula for the photoelectric process which incorporates a ‘constant’ of 2.64 × 10^{−26}, which is in fact not a constant but rather a function of the photon energy. A linear relationship between Z^{2.94} has been shown for a limited number of compounds for low-energy x-rays, but within the same publication it is shown that many compounds do not lie on the same trendline. As such, for polyenergetic photon sources (in particular, for applications such as radiotherapy), the effective atomic number varies significantly with energy. It is possible to obtain a much more accurate single-valued Z_{eff} by weighting against the spectrum of the source. The effective atomic number for electron interactions may be calculated with a similar approach. The cross-section based approach for determining Z_{eff} is obviously much more complicated than the simple power-law approach described above, and this is why freely-available software has been developed for such calculations.

== Bibliography ==
- Eisberg and Resnick, Quantum Physics of Atoms, Molecules, Solids, Nuclei, and Particles.
