= Henry Moseley =

English physicist (1887–1915)

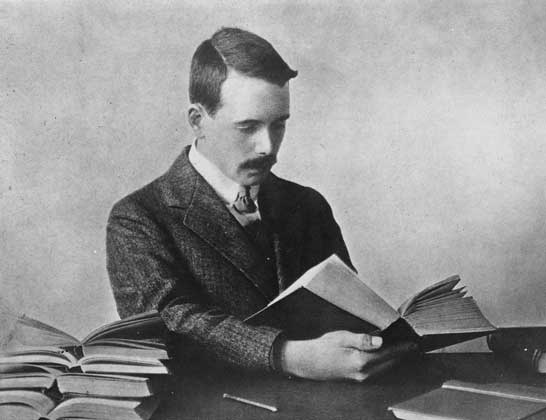
- Moseley in 1914
- Born: Henry Gwyn Jeffreys Moseley; 23 November 1887; Weymouth, Dorset, England
- Died: 10 August 1915 (aged 27); Gallipoli, Ottoman Empire
- Cause of death: Killed in action
- Education: Summer Fields School; Eton College
- Alma mater: University of Oxford (BA)
- Known for: Atomic number Moseley's law
- Awards: Matteucci Medal (1919)
- Scientific career
- Fields: Physics; Chemistry

Henry Gwyn Jeffreys Moseley (/ˈmoʊzli/; 23 November 1887 – 10 August 1915) was an English physicist, whose contribution to the science of physics was the justification from physical laws of the previous empirical and chemical concept of the atomic number. This stemmed from his development of Moseley's law in X-ray spectra.

Moseley's law advanced atomic physics, nuclear physics and quantum physics by providing the first experimental evidence in favour of Niels Bohr's theory, aside from the hydrogen atom spectrum which the Bohr theory was designed to reproduce. That theory refined Ernest Rutherford's and Antonius van den Broek's model, which proposed that the atom contains in its nucleus a number of positive nuclear charges that is equal to its (atomic) number in the periodic table.

When World War I broke out in Western Europe, Moseley left his research work at the University of Oxford behind to volunteer for the Royal Engineers of the British Army. Moseley was assigned to the force of British Empire soldiers that invaded the region of Gallipoli, Turkey, in April 1915, as a telecommunications officer. Moseley was shot and killed during the Battle of Gallipoli on 10 August 1915, at the age of 27. Experts have speculated that Moseley could otherwise have been awarded the Nobel Prize in Physics in 1916.

== Education and early life ==
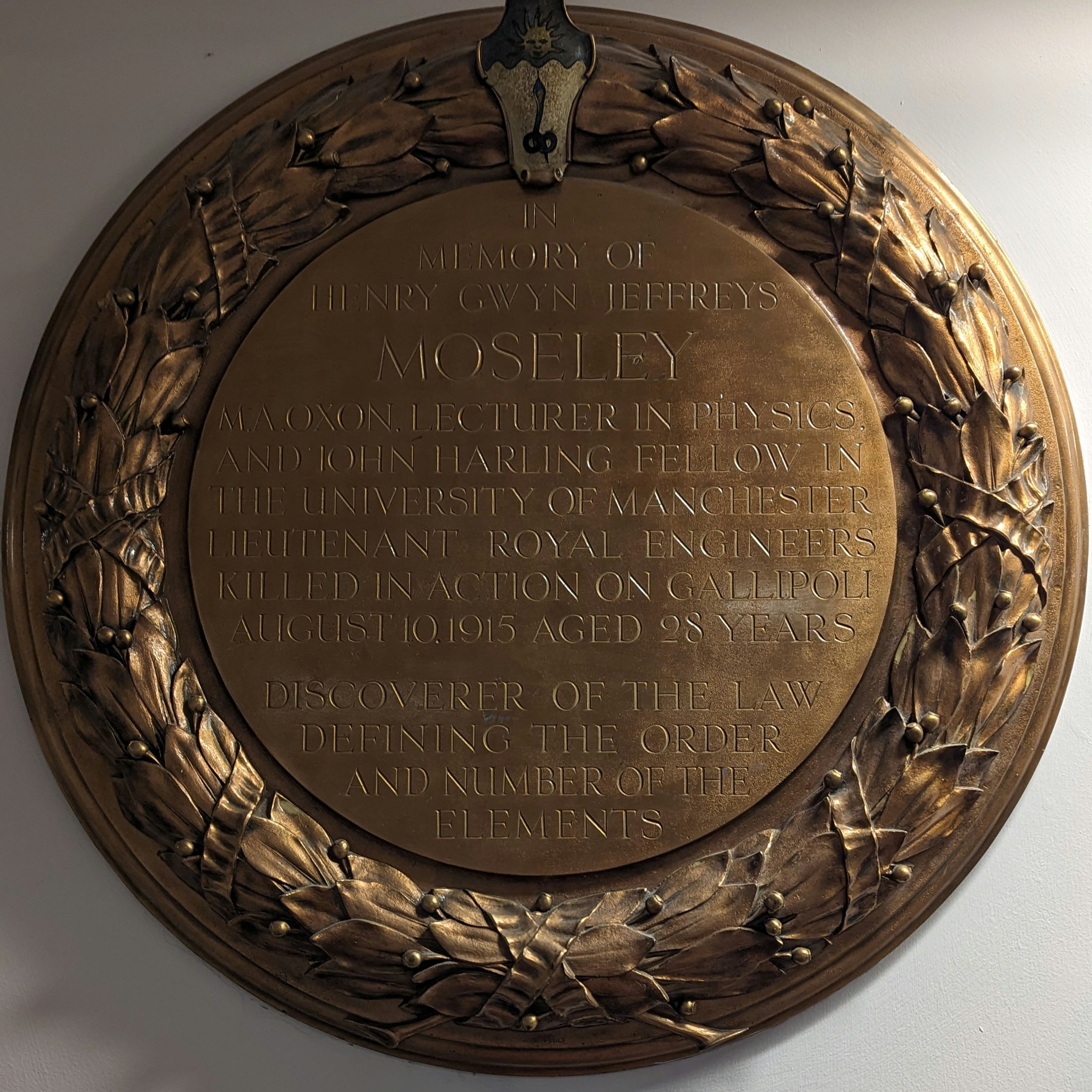
A plaque commemorating Moseley's work in the Department of Physics and Astronomy, University of Manchester

Henry G. J. Moseley, known to his friends as Harry, was born in Weymouth in Dorset in 1887. His father Henry Nottidge Moseley (1844–1891), who died when Moseley was quite young, was a biologist and also a professor of anatomy and physiology at the University of Oxford, who had been a member of the Challenger Expedition. Moseley's mother was Amabel Gwyn Jeffreys, the daughter of the Welsh biologist and conchologist John Gwyn Jeffreys. She was also the British women's champion of chess in 1913. (Note: After the death of her first husband, she married again, to William Johnson Sollas, a professor of geology at Oxford University.)

Moseley had been a very promising schoolboy at Summer Fields School (where one of the four "leagues" is named after him), and he was awarded a King's Scholarship to attend Eton College. In 1906 he won the chemistry and physics prizes at Eton. In 1906, Moseley enrolled at the University of Oxford as an undergraduate student of Trinity College, Oxford, where he earned his Bachelor of Arts (BA) degree. While an undergraduate at Oxford, Moseley became a Freemason by joining the Apollo University Lodge. Immediately after graduation from Oxford in 1910, Moseley became a demonstrator in physics at the University of Manchester, was elected to membership of the Manchester Literary and Philosophical Society on 9 May 1911, and was under the supervision of Ernest Rutherford. During Moseley's first year at Manchester, he had a teaching load as a graduate teaching assistant (TA), but following that first year, he was reassigned from his teaching duties to work as a graduate research assistant (RA). He declined a fellowship offered by Rutherford, preferring to move back to Oxford, in November 1913, where he was given laboratory facilities but no support.

== Career and research ==
Experimenting with the energy of beta particles in 1912, Moseley showed that high potentials were attainable from a radioactive source of radium, thereby inventing the first atomic battery, though he was unable to produce the 1MV necessary to stop the particles.

In 1913, Moseley observed and measured the X-ray spectra of various chemical elements (mostly metals) that were found by the method of diffraction through crystals. This was a pioneering use of the method of X-ray spectroscopy in physics, using Bragg's diffraction law to determine the X-ray wavelengths. Moseley discovered a systematic mathematical relationship between the wavelengths of the X-rays produced and the atomic numbers of the metals that were used as the targets in X-ray tubes. This has become known as Moseley's law.

Before Moseley's discovery, the atomic numbers (or elemental number) of an element had been thought of as a semi-arbitrary sequential number, based on the sequence of atomic masses, but modified somewhat where chemists found this modification to be desirable, such as by the Russian chemist, Dmitri Ivanovich Mendeleev. In his invention of the Periodic Table of the Elements, Mendeleev had interchanged the orders of a few pairs of elements to put them in more appropriate places in this table of the elements. For example, the metals cobalt and nickel had been assigned the atomic numbers 27 and 28, respectively, based on their known chemical and physical properties, even though they have nearly the same atomic masses. In fact, the atomic mass of cobalt is slightly larger than that of nickel, so nickel would be placed in the Periodic Table before cobalt if they were placed purely according to atomic mass. However Moseley's experiments in X-ray spectroscopy showed directly from their physics that cobalt and nickel have the different atomic numbers, 27 and 28, and that they are placed in the Periodic Table correctly by Moseley's objective measurements of their atomic numbers. Hence, Moseley's discovery demonstrated that the atomic numbers of elements are not just rather arbitrary numbers based on chemistry and the intuition of chemists, but rather, they have a firm experimental basis from the physics of their X-ray spectra.

In addition, Moseley showed that there were gaps in the atomic number sequence at numbers 43, 61, 72, and 75. These spaces are now known, respectively, to be the places of the radioactive synthetic elements technetium and promethium, and also the last two quite rare naturally occurring stable elements hafnium (discovered 1923) and rhenium (discovered 1925). Nothing was known about these four elements in Moseley's lifetime, not even their very existence. Based on the intuition of a very experienced chemist, Dmitri Mendeleev had predicted the existence of a missing element in the Periodic Table, which was later found to be filled by technetium, and Bohuslav Brauner had predicted the existence of another missing element in this Table, which was later found to be filled by promethium. Henry Moseley's experiments confirmed these predictions, by showing exactly what the missing atomic numbers were, 43 and 61. In addition, Moseley predicted the existence of two more undiscovered elements, those with the atomic numbers 72 and 75, and gave very strong evidence that there were no other gaps in the Periodic Table between the elements aluminium (atomic number 13) and gold (atomic number 79).

This latter question about the possibility of more undiscovered ("missing") elements had been a standing problem among the chemists of the world, particularly given the existence of the large family of the lanthanide series of rare earth elements. Moseley was able to demonstrate that these lanthanide elements, i.e. lanthanum through lutetium, must have exactly 15 members – no more and no less. The number of elements in the lanthanides had been a question that was very far from being settled by the chemists of the early 20th Century. They could not yet produce pure samples of all the rare-earth elements, even in the form of their salts, and in some cases they were unable to distinguish between mixtures of two very similar (adjacent) rare-earth elements from the nearby pure metals in the Periodic Table. For example, there was a so-called "element" that was even given the chemical name of "didymium". "Didymium" was found some years later to be simply a mixture of two genuine rare-earth elements, and these were given the names neodymium and praseodymium, meaning "new twin" and "green twin". Also, the method of separating the rare-earth elements by the method of ion exchange had not been invented yet in Moseley's time.

Moseley's method in early X-ray spectroscopy was able to sort out the above chemical problems promptly, some of which had occupied chemists for a number of years. Moseley also predicted the existence of element 61, a lanthanide whose existence was previously unsuspected. Quite a few years later, this element 61 was created artificially in nuclear reactors and was named promethium.

=== Contribution to understanding of the atom ===
Before Moseley and his law, atomic numbers had been thought of as a semi-arbitrary ordering number, vaguely increasing with atomic weight but not strictly defined by it. Moseley's discovery showed that atomic numbers were not arbitrarily assigned, but rather, they have a definite physical basis. Moseley postulated that each successive element has a nuclear charge exactly one unit greater than its predecessor. Moseley redefined the idea of atomic numbers from its previous status as an ad hoc numerical tag to help sorting the elements into an exact sequence of ascending atomic numbers that made the Periodic Table exact. (This was later to be the basis of the Aufbau principle in atomic studies.) As noted by Bohr, Moseley's law provided a reasonably complete experimental set of data that supported the (new from 1911) conception by Ernest Rutherford and Antonius van den Broek of the atom, with a positively charged nucleus surrounded by negatively charged electrons in which the atomic number is understood to be the exact physical number of positive charges (later discovered and called protons) in the central atomic nuclei of the elements. Moseley mentioned the two scientists above in his research paper, but he did not actually mention Bohr, who was rather new on the scene then. Simple modifications of Rydberg's and Bohr's formulas were found to give a theoretical justification for Moseley's empirically derived law for determining atomic numbers.

=== Use of X-ray spectrometer ===
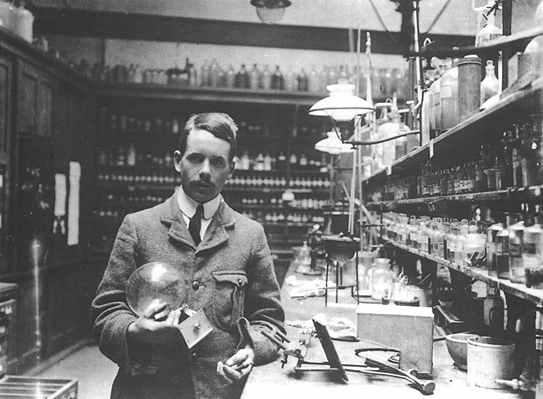
Moseley in the Balliol-Trinity Laboratories in 1910

X-ray spectrometers are the foundation-stones of X-ray crystallography. The X-ray spectrometers as Moseley knew them worked as follows. A glass-bulb electron tube was used, similar to that held by Moseley in the photo here. Inside the evacuated tube, electrons were fired at a metallic substance (i.e. a sample of pure element in Moseley's work), causing the ionization of electrons from the inner electron shells of the element. The rebound of electrons into these holes in the inner shells next causes the emission of X-ray photons that were led out of the tube in a semi-beam, through an opening in the external X-ray shielding. These are next diffracted by a standardized salt crystal, with angular results read out as photographic lines by the exposure of an X-ray film fixed at the outside the vacuum tube at a known distance. Application of Bragg's law (after some initial guesswork of the mean distances between atoms in the metallic crystal, based on its density) next allowed the wavelength of the emitted X-rays to be calculated.

Moseley participated in the design and development of early X-ray spectrometry equipment, learning some techniques from William Henry Bragg and William Lawrence Bragg at the University of Leeds, and developing others himself. Many of the techniques of X-ray spectroscopy were inspired by the methods that are used with visible light spectroscopes and spectrograms, by substituting crystals, ionization chambers, and photographic plates for their analogs in light spectroscopy. In some cases, Moseley found it necessary to modify his equipment to detect particularly soft (lower frequency) X-rays that could not penetrate either air or paper, by working with his instruments in a vacuum chamber.

== World War I, death and aftermath ==
Sometime in the first half of 1914, Moseley resigned from his position at Manchester, with plans to return to Oxford and continue his physics research there. However, World War I broke out in August 1914, and Moseley turned down this job offer to instead enlist with the Royal Engineers of the British Army. His family and friends tried to persuade him not to join, but he thought it was his duty. Moseley served in the rank of second lieutenant as a technical officer in communications during the Battle of Gallipoli, in Turkey, beginning in April 1915. In late July and early August 1915, Moseley spent a brief period on the Greek island of Lemnos, where he described swimming, exploring the hills and purchasing food from local villagers. In a letter to his mother dated 3 August, he expressed admiration for the island's scenery and pleasant climate. On 4 August, he left Moudros for Gallipoli, landing near ANZAC Cove. He was killed by a sniper on 10 August 1915. Having no known grave, his name is inscribed on the Commonwealth War Graves Commission's Helles Memorial.

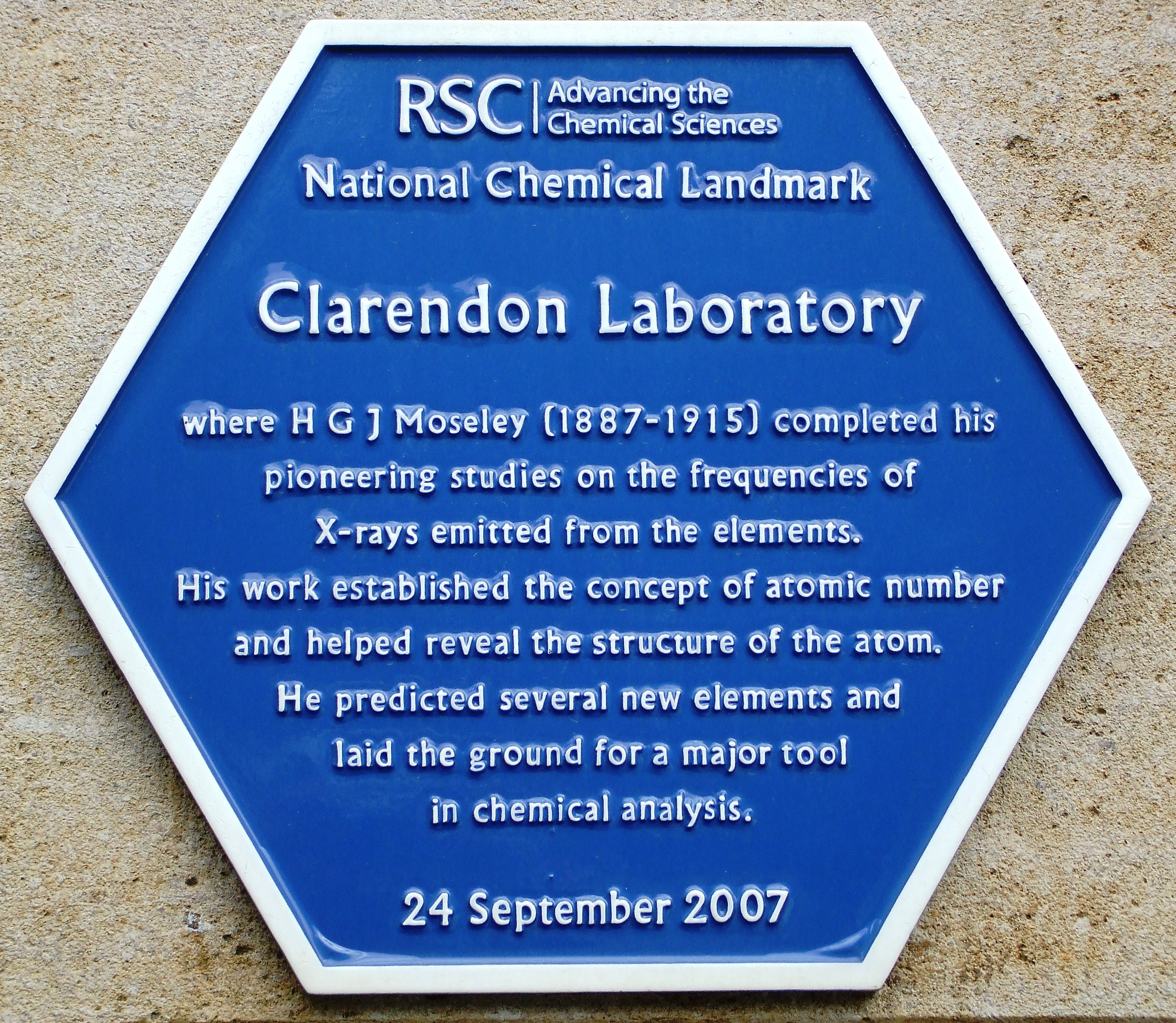
Blue plaque erected by the Royal Society of Chemistry on the Townsend Building of Oxford's Clarendon Laboratory, commemorating Moseley's work on X-rays emitted by elements

Only twenty-seven years old at the time of his death, Moseley could, in the opinion of some scientists, have contributed much to the knowledge of atomic structure had he survived. Niels Bohr said in 1962 that Rutherford's work "was not taken seriously at all" and that the "great change came from Moseley."

Robert Millikan wrote, "In a research which is destined to rank as one of the dozen most brilliant in conception, skillful in execution, and illuminating in results in the history of science, a young man twenty-six years old threw open the windows through which we can glimpse the sub-atomic world with a definiteness and certainty never dreamed of before. Had the European War had no other result than the snuffing out of this young life, that alone would make it one of the most hideous and most irreparable crimes in history."

George Sarton wrote, "His fame was already established on such a secure foundation that his memory will be green forever. He is one of the immortals of science, and though he would have made many other additions to our knowledge if his life had been spared, the contributions already credited to him were of such fundamental significance, that the probability of his surpassing himself was extremely small. It is very probable that however long his life, he would have been chiefly remembered because of the 'Moseley law' which he published at the age of twenty-six."

Isaac Asimov wrote, "In view of what he [Moseley] might still have accomplished … his death might well have been the most costly single death of the War to mankind generally." Rutherford believed that Moseley's work would have earned him the Nobel Prize. Before his death, Moseley was nominated for the 1915 chemistry prize by Svante Arrhenius; the Nobel Foundation statutes at the time allowed the prize to be awarded posthumously to a person who died after nomination, so 1915 would be the only chance to award the prize to Moseley. Despite this, the Nobel committee instead awarded the 1915 chemistry prize to Richard Willstätter. The 1917 Nobel Prize in physics was awarded to C.G. Barkla "for his discovery of the characteristic Rontgen radiation of the elements", work that built strongly on Moseley's.

Memorial plaques to Moseley were installed at Manchester and Eton, and a Royal Society scholarship, established by his will, had as its second recipient the physicist P. M. S. Blackett, who later became president of the Society. The Institute of Physics Henry Moseley Medal and Prize is named in his honour.
