= Summer Fields School =

Coordinates: 51°46′41″N 1°15′47″W

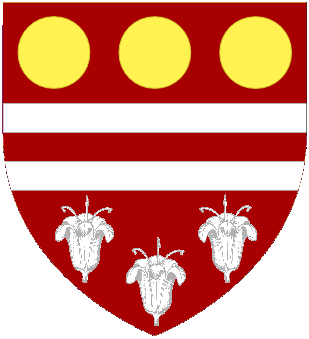

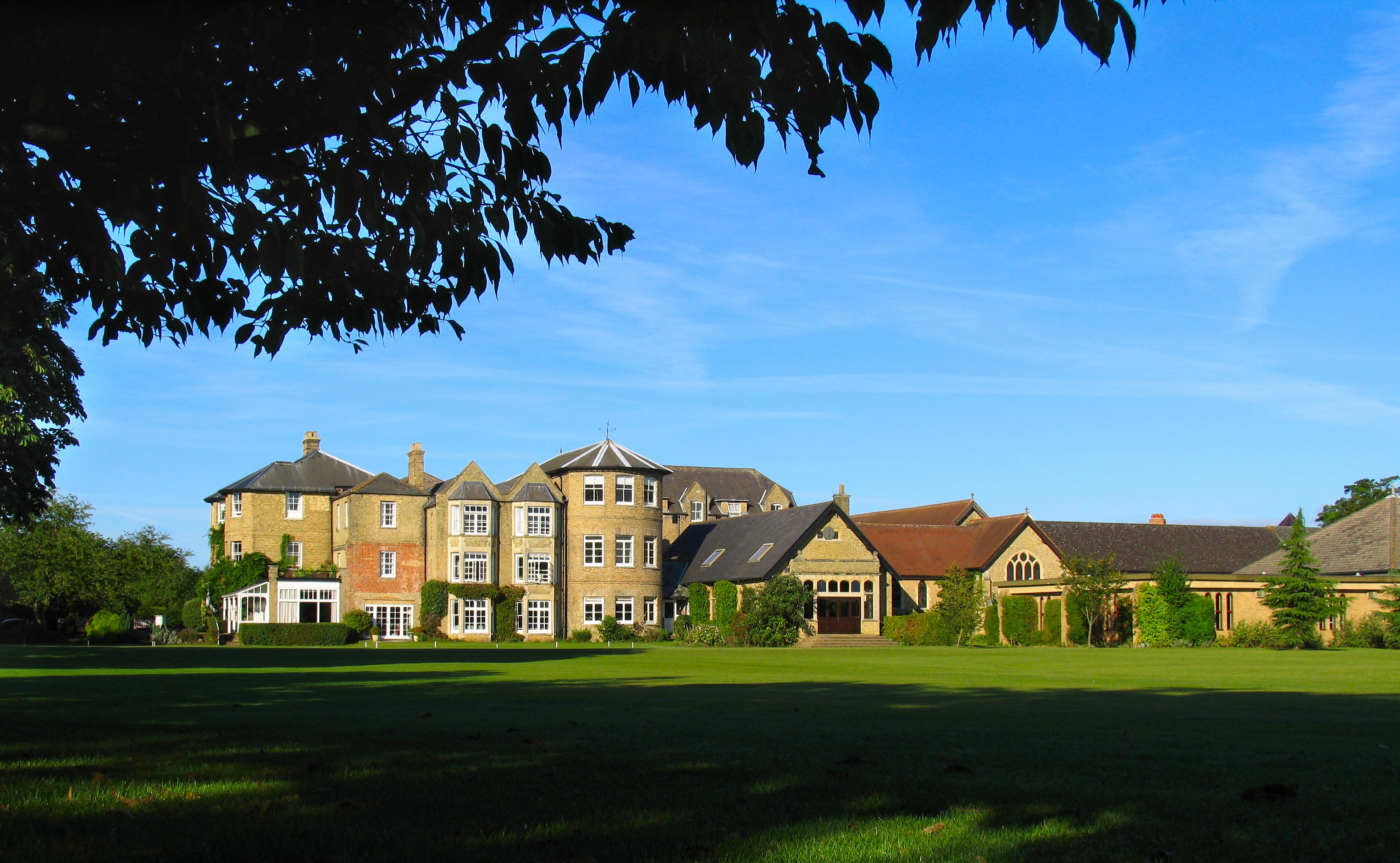
- The school from its playing fields

Location
- Mayfield Road; Oxford, OX2 7EN; England

Information
- Type: Private preparatory school Boarding school
- Motto: Mens sana in corpore sano
- Established: 1864
- Founder: Archibald Maclaren
- Department for Education URN: 123293 Tables
- Chairman of the Governors: A.E. Reeks, MA, FRSA
- Headmaster: David Faber MA (Balliol College, Oxford)
- Deputy Headmaster: David Woolley MA (Durham)
- Gender: Boys
- Age: 4 to 13
- Houses: Case, Congreve, Maclaren, Moseley
- Former pupils: Old Summerfieldians
- Website: http://www.summerfields.com/

Summer Fields is a fee-paying boys' independent day and boarding preparatory school in Summertown, Oxford. It was originally called Summerfield and used to have a subsidiary school, Summerfields, St Leonards-on-Sea (known as "Summers mi[nor]").

== History ==
Summerfield became a boys' preparatory school in 1864, with seven pupils. Its owner, Archibald MacLaren, had been educated at Dollar Academy and was a fencing teacher who ran a gymnasium in Oxford. He believed strongly in the importance of physical fitness. His wife, Gertrude, was a classical scholar and teacher, a daughter of David Alphonso Talboys. The school motto is Mens sana in corpore sano, "A healthy mind in a healthy body".

The school grew and needed more staff, two of whom married into the Maclaren family: the Reverend Dr Charles Williams ("Doctor"), who took over the scholarship form from Mrs Maclaren and married Mabel Maclaren in 1879, and the Reverend Hugh Alington, who married Margaret Maclaren in 1885 and took over the boys' games. The school remained in the hands of the Maclaren, Williams, and Alington families for its first 75 years.

At the end of the 19th century, "Doctor" became headmaster and there was much building at the school. A second school, "Summers mi", (Note: "mi" stood for "minor", i.e. junior. Boys at the school were known by their surnames; a pair of brothers named Smith would be called "Smith ma[jor]" and "Smith mi[nor]".) was opened at St Leonards-on-Sea, Sussex, for boys to benefit from the sea air. In 1918 Doctor passed the headmastership on to Hugh Alington. There was a lean spell in the 1930s, and numbers fell, but John Evans and Geoffrey Bolton ("G.B.") took over in 1939. During the Second World War three other schools were evacuated to Summer Fields – Famborough School, Hampshire, Summers mi, and St Cyprian's School from Eastbourne – and this restored the numbers.

In 1955, the school became a charitable trust, with a board of governors, including Harold Macmillan, who had been at the school as a boy and was soon to become prime minister.

Drawing of Summer Fields from A Century of Summer Fields, 1964

During the 1960s, Pat Savage was headmaster, with the assistance of Jimmy Bell and Pat Marston. By the centenary year in 1964, the school's appearance had changed relatively little (see illustration), but it was thriving and energetic enough to celebrate with a hardback book of 332 pages, with contributions from "O.S.", or Old Summerfieldians, including stories about Archibald Wavell, 1st Earl Wavell, and Harold Macmillan, and a friendly greeting in verse from the arch-rival Horris Hill School. A former pupil recollected Pat Marston as follows:

Then I met the Ogre. For my first few weeks I was terrified by this "monster". His appearance was formidable. He growled and shook the room as he entered. But once I learnt that he didn't actually eat little boys, even on Black Fridays, (Note: Pat Marston had the habit of putting up a sign indicating his mood on his days on duty.) the classes became amusing, exhilarating and even relaxing.

In 1975, Nigel Talbot Rice took over as headmaster. He put the school on a sound financial footing through a series of appeals which paid for an ambitious building programme: new classrooms, the Macmillan Hall and Music Centre, an indoor swimming-pool, the Wavell Arts and Technology Centre (named after Earl Wavell), and the Sports Hall. In 1997, Talbot Rice retired and was succeeded by Robin Badham-Thornhill. In 2010 David Faber, an old boy and governor, took over as headmaster.

In 2002 a new lodge called "Savage's" was built. Later a new year group was added at the bottom of the school.

== Summer Fields today ==
The boys are organised into four "leagues". One of them is named Maclaren, after the Founder; the others are Moseley, after Henry Moseley, Congreve, after William La Touche Congreve, and Case, after William Sterndale Case, a master from 1910 to 1922. Each league has its own identifying colour: Case red, Congreve yellow, Maclaren green, and Moseley blue. In leagues, the boys wear a polo shirt in the league colour, along with the rest of the uniform, blue corduroys, and black shoes. On Sundays as well as on special days, such as the school concert, and the end of term, boys wear a tweed jacket, with a light blue coloured shirt, black shoes, and grey flannel trousers. Their ties are in their league colours.

The school has traditionally been a rival of the Dragon School, which is also in north Oxford.

== Old Summerfieldians ==
See also Category:People educated at Summer Fields School

- Gubby Allen (1902–1989), cricketer
- Julian Amery (1919–1996), politician
- Ralph Assheton, 1st Baron Clitheroe (1901–1984), politician
- Anthony Asquith (1902–1968), film director
- Cyril Asquith, Baron Asquith of Bishopstone (1890–1954), judge
- Cuthbert Bardsley (1907–1991), bishop
- Tom Parker Bowles (1974– ), writer
- Harold Caccia, Baron Caccia (1905–1990), diplomat
- Sir Olaf Caroe (1892–1981), colonial administrator
- Mark Colvin (1952–2017), broadcaster and journalist
- William La Touche Congreve VC, DSO, MC (1891–1916)
- Hugh Dalton, (1887–1962), politician
- Robin Durnford-Slater (1902–1984), admiral
- David Faber (1961– ), politician, schoolmaster
- Hugh Fearnley-Whittingstall (1965–), chef and food writer
- Neville Ford (1906–2000), cricketer
- Harold Freeman-Attwood (1897–1963), soldier
- Julian Grenfell (1888–1915), poet
- Field Marshal Lord Inge, Chief of the General Staff
- Monsignor Ronald Knox (1888–1957), theologian
- Sir Christopher Lee (1922–2015), actor
- Harold Macmillan (1894–1986), Prime Minister
- Sir William Macpherson (1926–2021), judge and Chief of the Clan Macpherson
- Patrick Macnee (1922–2015), actor
- Henry Gwyn Jeffreys Moseley (1887–1915), physicist
- Adam Nicolson (1957–), writer
- Sir Andrew Noble, 1st Baronet (1831–1915), physicist
- Victor Pasmore (1908–1998), artist and architect
- Sir James Pitman (1901–1985), inventor of the Initial Teaching Alphabet
- Archibald Wavell, 1st Earl Wavell (1883–1950), Viceroy of India (Note: Commander of Imperial and Allied land forces in the Near East during World War II, penultimate Viceroy of India. The Summer Fields magazine once recorded that "Wavell mi. has done well in Africa".)
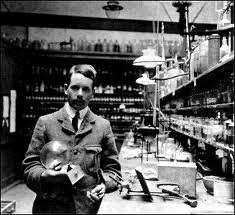
Henry Moseley, physicist

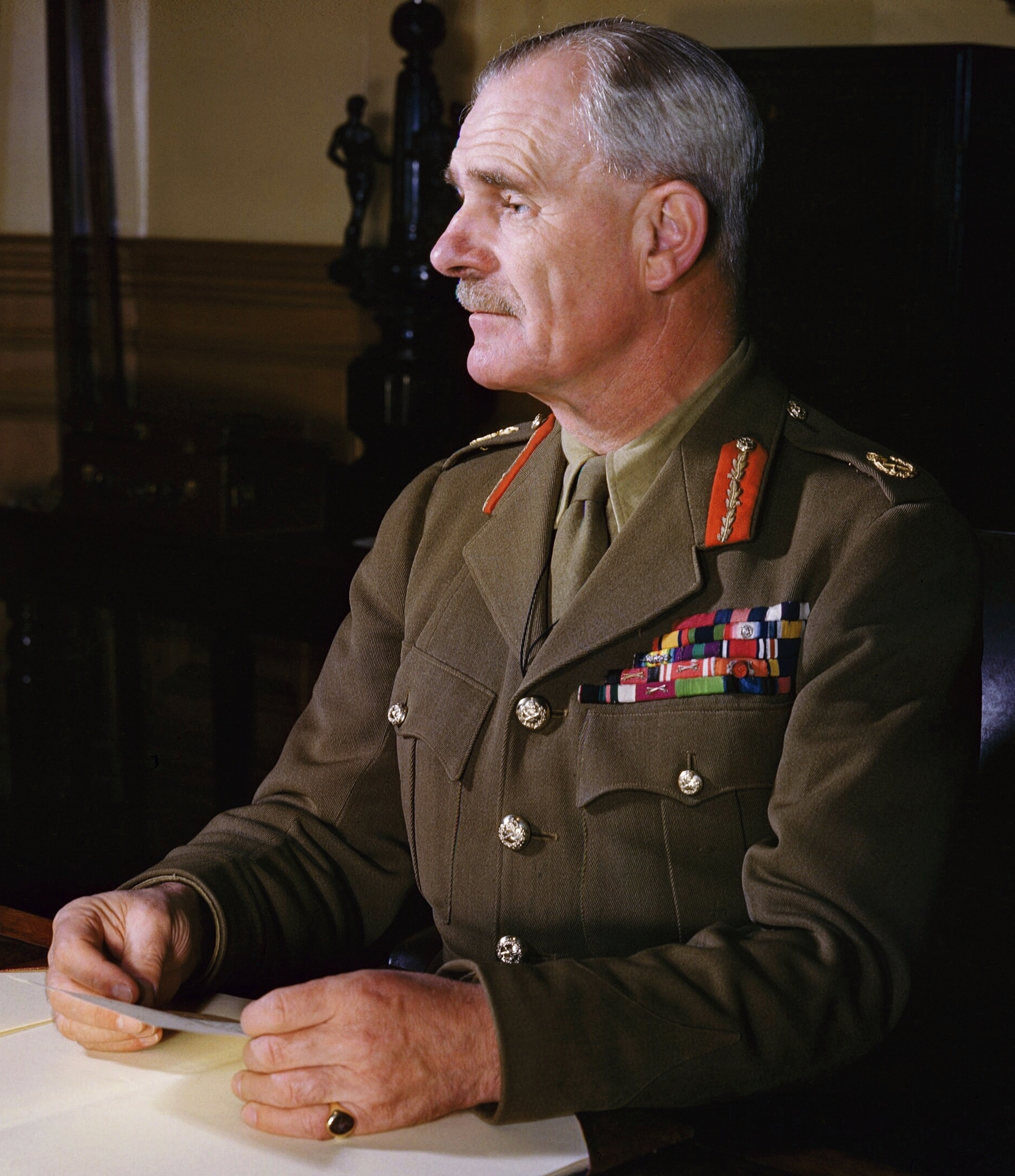
Archibald Wavell, Viceroy of India

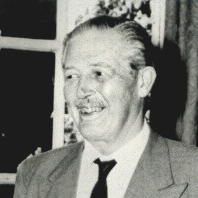
Harold Macmillan, Prime Minister

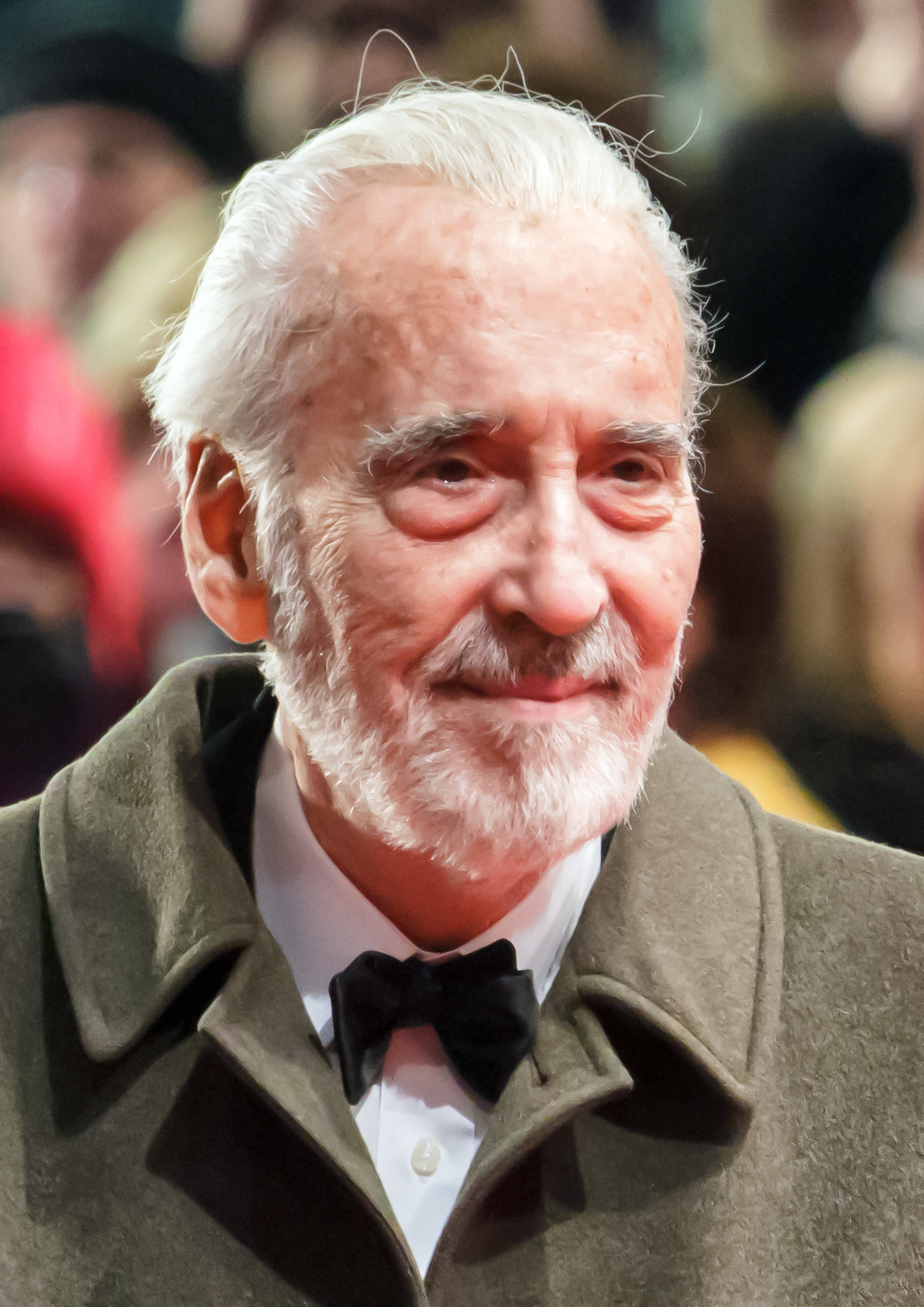
Christopher Lee, actor

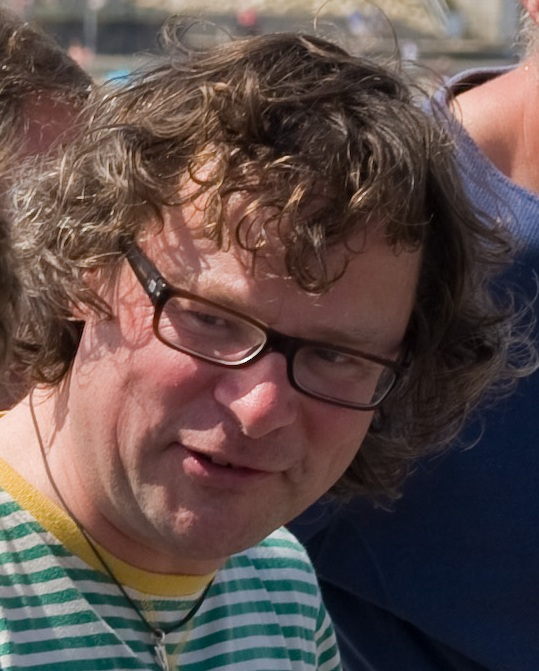
Hugh Fearnley-Whittingstall, celebrity chef

== Sources ==
- Summerfields School Register 1864-1960, Oxonian Press 1960
- Usborne, Richard (1964). A Century of Summer Fields. Methuen.
- Nicholas Aldridge, Time to spare? A History of Summer Fields, 1989
