= Moseley's law =

Law concerning X-rays emitted by atoms

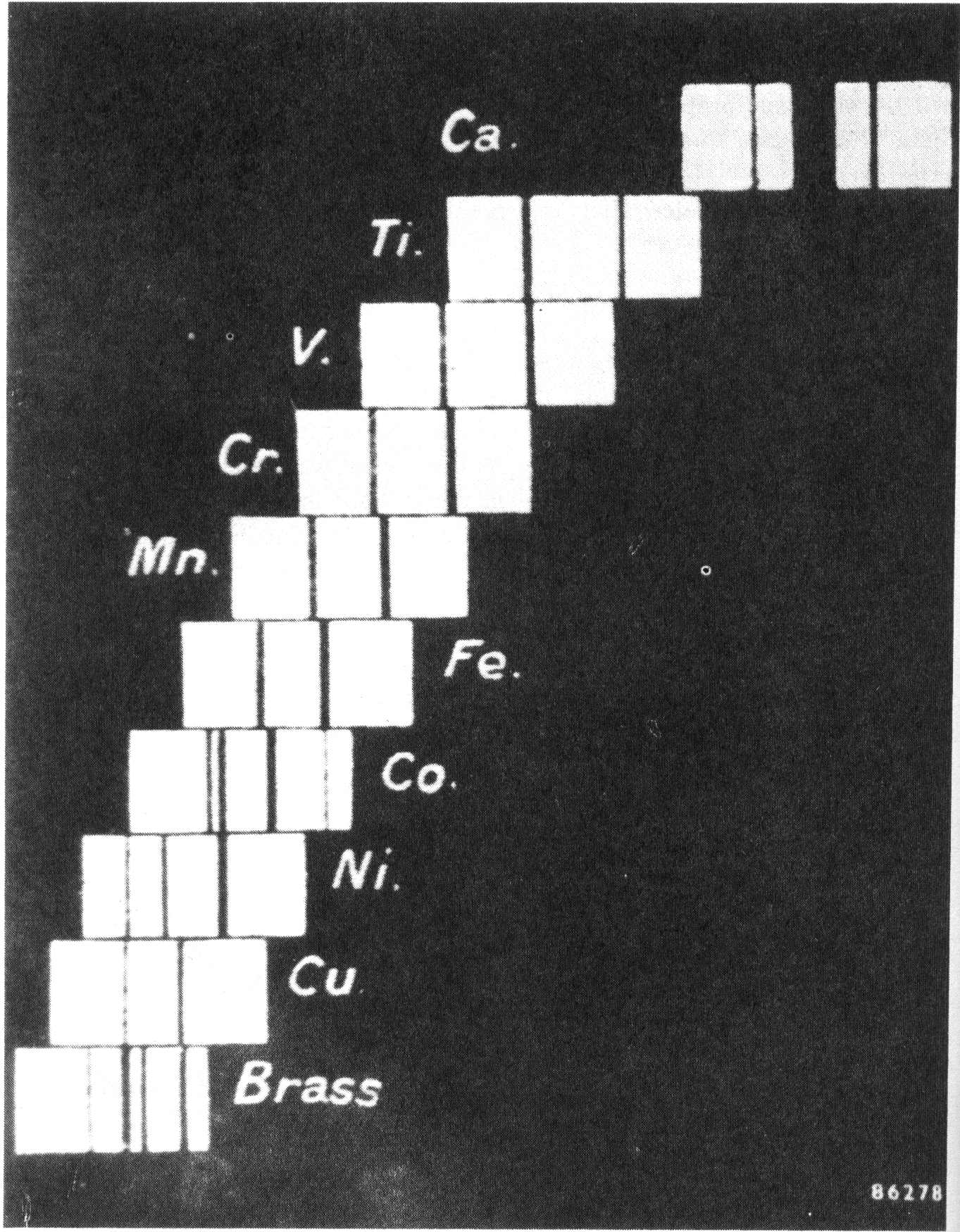
Photographic recording of Kα and Kβ X-ray emission lines for a range of elements

Moseley's law is an empirical law concerning the characteristic X-rays emitted by atoms. The law was discovered and published by the English physicist Henry Moseley in 1913–1914. Until Moseley's work, "atomic number" was merely an element's place in the periodic table and was not known to be associated with any measurable physical quantity. In brief, the law states that the square root of the frequency of the emitted X-ray is approximately proportional to the atomic number:
$$\sqrt \nu \varpropto Z .$$

== History ==
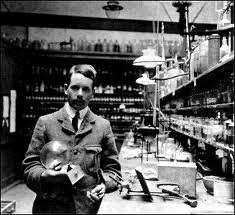
Henry Moseley, holding an X-ray tube

The historic periodic table was roughly ordered by increasing atomic weight, but in a few famous cases the physical properties of two elements suggested that the heavier ought to precede the lighter, as when Mendeleev placed cobalt before nickel on his periodic table on the basis of their chemical properties, despite that cobalt's atomic weight is 58.9 as against nickel's 58.7.

Henry Moseley and other physicists used X-ray diffraction to study the elements, and the results of their experiments led to organizing the periodic table by proton count.

== Apparatus ==
Since the spectral emissions for the lighter elements would be in the soft X-ray range (absorbed by air), the spectrometry apparatus had to be enclosed inside a vacuum. Details of the experimental setup are documented in the journal articles "The High-Frequency Spectra of the Elements" Part I and Part II.

== Results ==
Moseley found that the $K\alpha$ lines (in Siegbahn notation) were indeed related to the atomic number, Z.

Following Bohr's lead, Moseley found that for the spectral lines, this relationship could be approximated by a simple formula, later called Moseley's Law.
$$\nu = A \cdot \left(Z - b\right)^2$$
where:

- $\nu$ is the frequency of the observed X-ray emission line
- $A$ and $b$ are constants that depend on the type of line (that is, K, L, etc. in X-ray notation)
- $A = \left( \frac{1}{1^2} - \frac{1}{2^2} \right) \cdot$ Rydberg frequency and $b \$= 1 for $K\alpha$ lines, and $A = \left( \frac{1}{2^2} - \frac{1}{3^2} \right) \cdot$ Rydberg frequency and $b = 7.4$ for $L\alpha$ lines.

== Derivation ==
Moseley derived his formula empirically by fitting the square root of the X-ray frequency plotted against the atomic number. This formula can be explained based on the Bohr model of the atom, namely,
$$E = h\nu = E_\text{i}-E_\text{f}=\frac{m_\text{e} q_\text{e}^2 q_Z^2}{8 h^2 \varepsilon_{0}^2} \left( \frac{1}{n_\text{f}^2} - \frac{1}{n_\text{i}^2} \right) ,$$
where

- $\varepsilon_{0}$ is the permittivity of free space
- $m_\text{e}$ is the mass of an electron
- $q_\text{e}$ is the charge of an electron
- $q_Z$ is an effective charge of the nucleus, expressed as $(Z-b)q_e$
- $n_\text{f}$ is the quantum number of final energy level
- $n_\text{i}$ is the quantum number of initial energy level ($n_\text{i} > n_\text{f}$)
- $h$ is the Planck constant

Taking into account the empirically found b constant that reduced (or "screened") the nucleus charge, Bohr's formula for $K\alpha$ transitions becomes
$$E= h\nu = E_\text{i}-E_\text{f}=\frac{m_\text{e} q_\text{e}^4}{8 h^2 \varepsilon_{0}^2} \left( \frac{1}{1^2} - \frac{1}{2^2} \right)(Z-1)^2 \approx \frac{3}{4}(Z-1)^2 \times 13.6\ \mathrm{eV} .$$
Dividing both sides by h to convert to the frequency units, one obtains
$$\nu =\frac{E}{h} = \frac{m_\text{e} q_\text{e}^4}{8 h^3 \varepsilon_{0}^2} \frac{3}{4}(Z-1)^2 \approx (Z-1)^2 \times (2.47 \cdot 10^{15} \ \mathrm{Hz}).$$

== Screening ==
A simplified explanation for the effective charge of a nucleus being one less than its actual charge is that an unpaired electron in the K-shell screens it. An elaborate discussion criticizing Moseley's interpretation of screening can be found in a paper by Whitaker which is repeated in most modern texts.

A list of experimentally found and theoretically calculated X-ray transition energies is available at NIST. Nowadays, theoretical energies are computed with much greater accuracy than Moseley's law allows, using modern computational models such as the Dirac–Fock method (the Hartree–Fock method with the relativistic effects accounted for).

== See also ==
- Moseley's periodic law, concerning the modern periodic table.
- Auger electron spectroscopy, a similar phenomenon with increased X-ray yield from species of higher atomic number.
- Discovery of the neutron Moseley's law was an important step in the development of the understanding of the atom.
