= David Faber (politician) =

British politician

Member of Parliament for Westbury
- In office 9 April 1992 – 14 May 2001
- Preceded by: Dennis Walters
- Succeeded by: Andrew Murrison

Personal details
- Born: 7 July 1961 (age 64)
- Party: Conservative
- Spouse(s): 1. Sally Gilbert; 2. Sophie Hedley

David James Christian Faber (born 7 July 1961) is a schoolmaster and former Conservative member of the Parliament of the United Kingdom. He did not seek re-election in 2001, after which he became an author, before in 2010 being appointed as head master of Summer Fields School, Oxford. He is the grandson of the late former Conservative Prime Minister Harold Macmillan (1894–1986).

== Family and early life ==
The son of Julian and Lady Caroline Faber, Faber comes from an aristocratic political family drawn from the Whig and latterly the Conservative traditions. His maternal grandfather Harold Macmillan was Prime Minister at the time of his birth. His maternal grandmother, Lady Dorothy Cavendish, was descended from three Prime Ministers, the 4th Duke of Devonshire (1756–1757), the 2nd Earl of Shelburne (1782–1783) and the 3rd Duke of Portland (1783 and 1807–1809). Faber's great-great-great-granduncle was Lord Hartington and his great-grandfather Victor Cavendish, 9th Duke of Devonshire was also a statesman. His mother's cousins included Andrew Cavendish, 11th Duke of Devonshire, who was married to Deborah Mitford, and Andrew's elder brother William Cavendish, Marquess of Hartington, who was married to Kathleen Kennedy, the sister of U.S. President John F. Kennedy and Senators Robert F. Kennedy and Edward M. "Ted" Kennedy. His uncle Maurice Macmillan was a leading figure of Edward Heath's 1970s government.

Faber was educated at Summer Fields School, Summertown; and then at Eton College and Balliol College, Oxford. As an undergrad, Faber was a member of the Bullingdon Club, an all-male dining club for Oxford University students dating back to 1780. It is known for its wealthy members, grand banquets, and bad behaviour, including vandalism of restaurants and students' rooms.

== Life and career ==
Faber first stood for Parliament, unsuccessfully, in 1987 at Stockton North, where he was defeated by Labour's Frank Cook.

He worked in marketing and as a political assistant to Jeffrey Archer before entering the House of Commons in 1992 as Conservative Member of Parliament for Westbury. He was parliamentary private secretary to the Minister of State at the Foreign and Commonwealth Office, 1994 to 1996, and then to the Secretary of State for Health, from 1996 to 1997. In opposition, after the Conservatives lost the 1997 general election, he was their front bench spokesman on Foreign and Commonwealth affairs, until 1998. He served as a member of several Parliamentary select committees: Social Security, 1992–1997, Culture, Media and Sport, 1998 to 2001, and the Public Accounts Committee, 2000–2001.

Faber stood down from parliament at the 2001 general election, to be succeeded by fellow Conservative Andrew Murrison, when he began a new career as a writer. His book Speaking for England: Leo, Julian and John Amery, the tragedy of a political family (2005) was about Julian Amery, his uncle by his (Amery's) marriage to Faber's maternal aunt, Julian's father Leo, and brother John, who was executed after the Second World War for high treason.

In 2009, he was appointed as head of his old prep school, Summer Fields, with effect from September 2010.

Faber married firstly Sally Gilbert, a television weather presenter, and they had one son together, but later divorced, with Faber citing James Hewitt as co-respondent. He married secondly Sophie Amanda Hedley, and they have two daughters. He is a past committee member of the Marylebone Cricket Club, the governing body of the game of cricket, managing an MCC tour of Canada in 2001. He is also a member of White's.

== Books ==
- Munich: The 1938 Appeasement Crisis (Simon & Schuster, 2008) – about the events of 1937–1938 and the Munich Conference. ISBN 1-8473-7008-X
- Speaking for England: Leo, Julian and John Amery (Simon & Schuster, 2005) – the Amery family and World War II. ISBN 0-7432-5688-3

Parliament of the United Kingdom
Preceded by Dennis Walters	Member of Parliament for Westbury; 1992–2001	Succeeded by Andrew Murrison
