= Alice Ormsby-Gore =

Daughter of 5th Baron Harlech, girlfriend of Eric Clapton

The Honourable Alice Ormsby-Gore
- Born: Alice Magdalen Sarah Ormsby-Gore; 22 April 1952; Shropshire, England
- Died: 5 April 1995 (aged 42); Bournemouth, Dorset, England
- Resting place: St Mary's the Virgin Church, Selattyn, Shropshire
- Education: Dalton School
- Partner: Eric Clapton
- Parent(s): The 5th Baron Harlech; Sylvia Lloyd Thomas
- Relatives: The 6th Baron Harlech (brother); Tallulah Harlech (niece)

Alice Magdalen Sarah Ormsby-Gore (22 April 1952 – 5 April 1995) was a British aristocrat who was part of the fashion and arts counter-culture in London during the 1960s. For about five years she was the romantic partner of guitarist Eric Clapton. The couple were briefly subjected to media speculation about a possible marriage. She died of a heroin overdose in 1995.

== Early life ==
Ormsby-Gore was born at her family's ancestral home, Brogyntyn Hall, in Shropshire, England. She was the youngest daughter of David Ormsby-Gore, M.P., and his first wife, Sylvia Lloyd-Thomas. The Ormsby-Gore family were, by descent, an Anglo-Irish aristocratic family who once owned a large country estate in County Leitrim.

David Ormsby-Gore succeeded as the 5th Baron Harlech in February 1964. From 1961 to 1965, Lord Harlech served as British Ambassador to the United States. The Ormsby-Gores enjoyed a close social relationship with the President and First Lady during their time in Washington. Alice played with some of the Kennedy children, including during visits to Robert F. Kennedy's home at Hickory Hill, and attended charity concerts at the White House, as on 19 November 1962.

The Ormsby-Gore family attracted the attention of the American media. The Washington Post published a picture of Alice and Francis on their bikes taken by staff photographer Douglas Chevalier: 'They are the Newest on the New Frontier ... When not taking lessons at the Embassy from their governess Elizabeth Shenton, they ride their bicycles, build miniature paper houses and gardens, or discuss farming at the family's country place Woodhill in Oswestry, Shropshire.' By February 1962 Alice was enrolled at the Stone Ridge Country Day school, a Catholic, independent school for girls at Bethesda, Maryland, US about 30 minutes from the British Embassy.

Ormsby-Gore returned to the UK in 1965 with her parents, and had only just turned 15 when on 30 May 1967 her mother was killed in a car accident. Early in 1968 she was reported as being in a London school and living with Lord Harlech's mother, the dowager Lady Harlech. Time magazine reported on Friday, 12 April 1968, that Lord Harlech would be sending his "15-year-old daughter, Alice Ormsby-Gore, to Manhattan's Dalton School for the coming spring term. Alice will stay at the East Side apartment of a family friend, John Hay Whitney, former U.S. Ambassador to the Court of St. James's."

While in New York in 1968, Ormsby-Gore appeared in a film by Gerard Joseph Malanga. A later New York Times article mentions this film: 'When Alice Ormsby-Gore shows up in town, it's usually an event. When she was here in 1968 she got up at dawn so she and Looloo de la Falaise [1948–2011] could sweep down the steps leading to Bethesda Fountain in their long, flowing dresses while Andy Warhol's octagonal, prismatic lens recorded it all for his 20-minute short, "pre-Raphaelite Dream". (Note: 14 May 1972 interview with Robert M. Thomas. The attribution to Warhol is incorrect. The film's length is 58 minutes. It was premiered in 1969.)

== Career ==
By the mid-1960s, Ormsby-Gore's elder siblings had established themselves in what had become Swinging London. Jane Ormsby-Gore's partner Michael Rainey opened the boutique Hung on You in 1964 which moved to the Kings Road in 1966. Julian and Jane signed with the English Boys model agency run by Sir Mark Palmer. With her siblings Alice was involved in various charity projects. One such was called 'Circus Alpha Centauri' which mounted concerts in London at Christmas 1967 to raise money for deprived children. One of the performers was the then unknown singer / guitarist Nick Drake, one of many musicians with whom the Ormsby-Gores had personal connections.

A year later Daily Mail columnist Charles Greville wrote that Victoria and Alice had started a company to 'generate peace and love between all races and creeds of this world ...

Called Circus Alpha Centauri, the Ormsby girls, with several other friends and backers, have just taken over business premises in Ludgate Circus. "We began the company a year ago," says Alice who is 16, "but after a period of inactivity we now have started again. The first thing we will do to raise money is to stage a festival of music in Lagos, Nigeria. We have already opened an office there and the Rolling Stones have said they'll perform. The whole idea is to bridge the great gap that exists between children who are rich and children that have nothing."

Greville wrote again about Ormsby-Gore's involvement with charitable work in 1970, contrasting her life with those of her elder sisters who are described as having moved into "hippy land", with some of their friends having been in court.

She is working for a welfare organisation which, among other things, helps drug addicts back to a normal life. "I'm not qualified to do anything really, so I thought I'd be a do-gooder," she tells me. Her father is, she says, "rather pleased that I'm doing something else besides learning to play the guitar." At the moment she is working part-time for the organisation known as Release, but she tells me that she's "hoping to do it full-time soon". She first came into contact with this lot of "do-gooders" when she was running a "peace circus" ... "I'm not very good at finances and we kept getting evicted from our offices," she explained. "Release helps young people who are being evicted and that's how I came to know about them."

Modelling and Vogue

By 1969 Ormsby-Gore was also working as an occasional model. She was photographed by David Montgomery for the 'New Londoners broad at home' article in the 15 March 1969 issue of British Vogue. She was also photographed by Norman Parkinson, Clive Arrowsmith, Tessa Traeger, Patrick Lichfield, and Francesco Scavullo. Other Vogue appearances include April 1969, July 1969, January 1970 and April 1971. In 1969, as 'Alice Gore', she registered with the model agency 'Monty' run by Peter Marlowe. She is featured in a 25 May 1973 Telegraph magazine colour photoshoot of clothes by Bill Gibb.

Hair! The Musical

Early in 1970 Ormsby-Gore was given a role in an upcoming production of the musical Hair! to be staged in Israel. "I just went to the audition in London and got the part … I had to learn Hebrew and ended up spending several months in a fishing village on the Sea of Galilee". On 1 June 1970 the production of Hair! in Tel Aviv opened and ran for six months, directed by Oliver Tobias and with Mick Jagger's brother Chris in the company. The LP of this production, sung in Hebrew, released on CBS later in 1970 credits Ormsby-Gore with vocals on the track 'Black Boy'. There are extant photos of Alice at a Hair! party with one of the other singers.

Her involvement with the musical took Ormsby-Gore back to New York in May 1972, where she gave the "Welcoming remarks" at a 4th anniversary international Hair! free performance in Central Park on 7 May, as a representative of the Israeli troupe. This was the occasion for the interview with Robert M. Thomas printed in the New York Times a week later as 'She follows a life style all her own'. Thomas recorded that she "has held an assortment of jobs from shop clerk to manager of a rock group. She has worked as a photographic model (but does more runway work) and helped train horses." He also wrote that her main love was music: "Music is everything to me; I think music is a part of God ...". Her father was also fond of music and she had grown up with his collection of jazz.

== Personal life ==
According to Ray Coleman, who conducted a lengthy interview with Ormsby-Gore for his 1985 biography of Eric Clapton, she was first attracted to the guitarist 'when they met at a party in Glebe Place, Chelsea during November 1968.' Cream played their final concert on 26 November. They met again the following spring, by which time Clapton had purchased Hurtwood Edge, a large Italianate villa in Surrey, and was forming his next group, Blind Faith. One account gives credit for the introduction to Ian Dallas in 1969 when Alice was 17. It was Dallas who first introduced Clapton to the Persian tale of Layla and Majnun, with Dallas suggesting Ormsby-Gore would be Layla (in fact, Clapton would identify Pattie Harrison as Layla). However, Clapton in his autobiography credits David Mlinaric, who did some interior design work for Clapton in March 1969. Mlinaric, a friend of Ormsby-Gore, took her with him, when visiting Clapton. Within a few weeks Clapton and Ormsby-Gore had formed a relationship. She was named as his girlfriend in an interview with Chris Welch, and lived thereafter partially at Hurtwood Edge.

On 7 June, Ormsby-Gore was photographed with Clapton, Ginger Baker and Germaine Greer backstage at Blind Faith's concert in Hyde Park. A few days later Ormsby-Gore travelled to Scandinavia during Blind Faith's 8-date tour, and was photographed with Clapton on 14 June in Oslo; and at Madison Square Garden on 12 July when the band played their first US gig.

Also during the summer of 1969 Ormsby-Gore entertained Marc Bolan and his girlfriend June Child at Hurtwood Edge. The friendship between Bolan, Child and Ormsby-Gore led to her being a witness at their wedding on 30 January 1970. Another mutual friend was the British singer Linda Lewis.

Ormsby-Gore is often described as being a fiancée of Clapton, but it is doubtful that this was ever more than newspaper speculation and leading questions by journalists. Talk of an engagement between Clapton and Ormsby-Gore appeared on 17 September 1969, but the couple were quick to debunk these remarks:

"While Lord Harlech's wedding plans run the course of true love, the marriage of his 17-year-old daughter Alice Ormsby-Gore, to 24-year-old guitarist Eric Clapton, a plasterer's son, seems rather more remote. Two months ago they admitted to being 'more or less engaged', with Eric adding, "Yes, I'd say there is more than a 50–50 chance we will get married soon". But yesterday Alice was saying: "We're certainly not thinking of getting married at the moment. But we do love each other and maybe it will happen in due course." A colleague of Clapton tried to explain: "Eric and Alice were a bit fraught after they said they were more or less engaged. I think they'll just go out and get married when they think their relationship needs the State's blessing. But I know they are not sitting around planning a wedding."

The relationship went through a tempestuous phase over the next year. Already romantically obsessed with Pattie Harrison, Clapton also had an involvement with Pattie's sister Paula Boyd through into 1970. This provoked a break with Ormsby-Gore, though there was a reconciliation in March 1970 when she travelled to New York to see him. They were photographed arriving back on 8 March, to more speculative questions about marriage, again denied by both. In the same month Pattie Harrison received a love letter from Clapton which led to a flirtation. In his autobiography Clapton mentions another argument with Ormsby-Gore after which she left Hurtwood Edge. As stated above she was in Israel from April/May until that November.

On her return she moved back into Hurtwood Edge. By then Clapton was using heroin quite heavily to mitigate his continuing obsession with George Harrison's wife Pattie Boyd; Alice also became hooked on the drug. In his autobiography Clapton says, "Alice came back to live with me, and she started using too".

The couple stayed together until early 1974. Clapton has stated he was not in love with Ormsby-Gore, but her account suggests she was deeply in love with him. In Ray Coleman's book Survivor she says, "Maybe because I was only seventeen I wrongly thought of it as mutual. My extreme youth made any rational analysis of the situation impossible." They led a mostly reclusive life, though they attended the wedding of Mick and Bianca Jagger in Saint-Tropez in May 1971, travelled to New York in late July for The Concert for Bangladesh in which Clapton starred, and to see the Who in Paris in September 1972. Of the New York visit Ormsby-Gore recalled:

I was desperately running around that city trying to score some heroin for Eric. And I remember thinking how stupid it was for me, even then. I did that for him, and for myself, for three years. It was probably childish to be over-protective, but I thought it helped him not to have to face the full horror, himself, of scoring his own heroin supply.

Ormsby-Gore played a significant role in encouraging Clapton to play a concert, with a select backing group of rock star friends, at the Rainbow on 13 January 1973. His first live appearance for some time, it did not lead to any others. By August 1973 the health of Clapton and Ormsby-Gore was causing deep concern among friends and family. In addition to using heroin, Ormsby-Gore had also developed alcohol dependency, her method for dealing with withdrawal symptoms if there was not enough heroin for both of them. Clapton acknowledged later that Ormsby-Gore dissuaded him from injecting the drug: "That was very clever of her really to see that that was a big step. And once you took that step, you were in a lot of trouble." An intervention by her father, Lord Harlech, along with counsel from Pete Townshend, and treatment by Meg Patterson, instigated a period of gradual recovery. By early 1974 Clapton was working on a Welsh border farm run by Francis Ormsby-Gore. Alice was treated separately at a nursing home near Regents Park in London. When in the spring they met again a decision was reached to end the relationship, with Clapton talking about his feelings for Pattie Harrison. Despite the break-up, Ormsby-Gore maintained a link with Clapton's grandmother Rose Clapp and was present at her funeral in December 1994.

=== Death of her brother ===
On 5 November 1974, aged 22, Ormsby-Gore found her elder brother, Julian, dead in his apartment from gunshot wounds, an apparent suicide.

Ormsby-Gore told the coroner at her brother's inquest that "He hadn't been working very much because he was receiving treatment from doctors. The last time I heard from him was 10 days before his death when he phoned me at home; I suggested he should visit me but he didn't come".

=== Wales and Paris ===
Ormsby-Gore's life showed none of the usual traits of the 'socialite'. She most likely shared the outlook of her sister Victoria in this regard: "I despise The Social Life because it degrades the spirit. It is belittling to drag yourself to parties with utterly pointless people whose main activity is clamouring for glamorous recognition." After living near her ancestral home in the late 1970s, Ormsby-Gore moved to Paris, France in 1982 where she lived a private and Bohemian life, including on a houseboat near the Sixth Arrondissement. She also travelled to Istanbul. In 1984 Ray Coleman interviewed her extensively in Paris for the first full-length biography of Eric Clapton. Coleman found her a willing and lucid interviewee; she had an 'exceptional memory for detail' and gave 'hours of heartfelt (...) crucially important recollections of the five years in which she and Eric lived together.'. Giving this interview may have led to the call she made to Clapton in December 1984, extending an invitation to Paris, which, despite the imminent break-up of his marriage to Pattie, he declined.

On 25 January 1985, her father Lord Harlech was killed in a car accident. Ormsby-Gore and her three surviving siblings (including her younger brother Francis Ormsby-Gore who succeeded their father in the title of Lord Harlech) and her half-sister, Pandora Colin attended the funeral, along with Jacqueline Kennedy Onassis, whom David Ormsby-Gore was romantically linked to in the late 1960s.

=== Final years ===
Alice Ormsby-Gore returned to England in 1994. She was treated in the Royal Shrewsbury Hospital for a time with liver and pancreas illness caused by alcohol. Later press coverage mentioned that in recent years she also had heart problems. She was persuaded to register at the Priory Hospital in South West London for treatment for heroin and alcohol addiction for three weeks in October 1994. While there she contacted Pete Townshend:

"She said it was hard to deal with the group therapy on offer because she felt she couldn't speak openly about her time with Eric. I told her that if she didn't speak about it she wouldn't get clean. As much as I loved Eric I told Alice to take care of herself for once. She stuck to her guns and died, tragically, the following year."

Clapton described how at The Priory there was a confrontational private session with him which indicated she was haunted by aspects of their time together during the years 1969–74. However, he also reported that she seemed optimistic about her treatment: "I was confident that she was making progress and anticipated that she would soon be on the road to a full and complete recovery." Ormsby-Gore told Chris Steele of The Priory that "she could not stand the pain of being sober."

Ormsby-Gore's last months were spent in Bournemouth, Dorset, living on benefits under the name of "Deirdre Stevenson" at several addresses, including a "half-way house" rehabilitation centre, with some support from Narcotics Anonymous. Her final address from March was a bedsit in Aylesbury Road, Boscombe, an area then notorious for drug dealing. Shortly before her death she was in hospital with injuries to her head, leg and arms which she said were from an assault by three men on nearby Walpole Road. One visitor to the flats at Aylesbury Road saw her sitting with two black eyes, a swollen jaw and her arm in plaster a few days before her death. She was also known to suffer black-outs.

Alice Ormsby-Gore died on 5 April 1995 after taking heroin which unwittingly was six times the fatal dose. Her body was discovered three days later at 10am on 8 April in her bedsit, with a belt in one hand and a syringe in another, a single needle mark in her arm. Her death was widely reported in the press. Her funeral took place on 22 April. By the time of the inquest in early May six other people had overdosed in the Bournemouth area owing to the heroin being unusually pure.

At the inquest pathologist Milena Lesna stated that medical records revealed Ormsby-Gore had made "remarkable progress" since the start of the year to break her addictions. A local man Brian Robertson, who knew her in her final months, told a journalist: "Alice wanted to help herself and was trying to stay sober. I don't believe she took any heroin in the time that I knew her since Christmas last year. Fate played a hand". They were optimistic for the future. 'She was a lovely, beautiful person. I was fortunate our paths crossed and I will remember her as she was, very intelligent, very kind, with a lovely soul.'

== Ancestry ==
Ancestors of Alice Ormsby-Gore

16. William Ormsby-Gore, 2nd Baron Harlech
8. George Ormsby-Gore, 3rd Baron Harlech
17. Lady Emily Seymour
4. William Ormsby-Gore, 4th Baron Harlech
18. Charles Gordon, 10th Marquess of Huntly
9. Lady Margaret Gordon
19. Maria Pegus
2. David Ormsby-Gore, 5th Baron Harlech
20. Robert Gascoyne-Cecil, 3rd Marquess of Salisbury
10. James Gascoyne-Cecil, 4th Marquess of Salisbury
21. Georgina Alderson
5. Lady Beatrice Gascoyne-Cecil
22. Arthur Gore, 5th Earl of Arran
11. Lady Cicely Gore
23. Hon. Edith Jocelyn
1. Alice Ormsby-Gore
24. Thomas Thomas
12. William Lloyd Thomas
25. Mary Edmunds
6. Hugh Lloyd Thomas
26. Sir Charles Hobhouse, 3rd Bt.
13. Ada Hobhouse
27. Edith Turton
3. Sylvia Lloyd Thomas
28. Edward Bellew, 2nd Baron Bellew
14. Hon. Richard Bellew
29. Augusta Bryan
7. Guendaline Ada Bellew
30. Henry Gilbey
15. Ada Gilbey
31. Catherine Shepherd

== Titles ==
- 22 April 1952 – 14 February 1964: Miss Alice Magdalen Sarah Ormsby-Gore
- 14 February 1964 – 5 April 1995: The Honourable Alice Magdalen Sarah Ormsby-Gore
