= David Ormsby-Gore, 5th Baron Harlech =

5th Baron Harlech, Member of Parliament and Ambassador to the United States

The Right Honourable The Lord Harlech KCMG PC DL
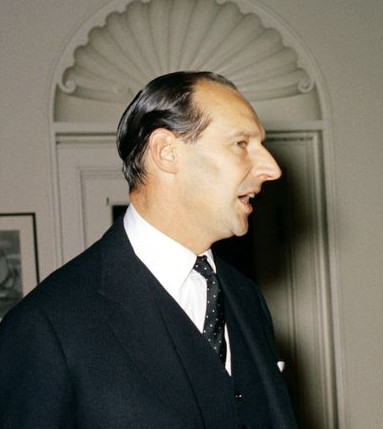

British Ambassador to the United States
- In office 1961–1965
- Monarch: Elizabeth II
- Prime Minister: Harold Macmillan; Alec Douglas-Home; Harold Wilson
- Preceded by: Harold Caccia
- Succeeded by: Sir Patrick Dean

Member of Parliament for Oswestry
- In office 23 February 1950 – 1 June 1961
- Preceded by: Oliver Poole
- Succeeded by: John Biffen

Member of the House of Lords
- In office 1965 – 26 January 1985 as a hereditary peer
- Preceded by: The 4th Baron Harlech
- Succeeded by: The 6th Baron Harlech

Personal details
- Born: William David Ormsby-Gore; 20 May 1918 Westminster, London, England
- Died: 26 January 1985 (aged 66) Shrewsbury, Shropshire, England
- Resting place: Llanfihangel-y-traethau, Wales
- Party: Conservative
- Spouses: Sylvia Lloyd Thomas (m. 1940; died 1967); Pamela Colin (m. 1969)
- Children: 6, including Alice and Francis
- Parents: The 4th Baron Harlech (father); Lady Beatrice Edith Mildred Gascoyne-Cecil (mother)
- Education: New College, Oxford
- Occupation: Airborne reconnaissance, farmer, politician, diplomat, television executive

William David Ormsby-Gore, 5th Baron Harlech KCMG PC DL (20 May 1918 – 26 January 1985), known as David Ormsby-Gore until June 1961 and as Sir David Ormsby-Gore from then until February 1964, was a British diplomat and Conservative politician.

== Early life ==
William David Ormsby-Gore was born into an Anglo-Irish aristocratic family on 20 May 1918 in Westminster, London, the second son of William Ormsby-Gore, 4th Baron Harlech, a Conservative politician, and Lady Beatrice Edith Mildred Gascoyne-Cecil. His maternal great-grandfather was British Prime Minister The 3rd Marquess of Salisbury. He was educated at St Cyprian's School, Eton College and New College, Oxford.

A well-known story told of him at Eton is that, when a boy in his house killed himself, the housemaster called the boys together, and asked if any of them had any idea why this should have happened. Ormsby-Gore put up his hand and asked, "Please sir, could it have been the food?"

In 1939, he was commissioned into the Royal Artillery (Berkshire Yeomanry Field Regiment), served in the 'Phantom' reconnaissance unit, and worked with airborne and other special units. By the end of the War, he held the rank of major on the general staff.

After the war, his father handed over to him all his land, and Ormsby-Gore farmed the 400 acres (1.6 km^{2}) of the Woodhill Estate, Oswestry, Shropshire. In 1948, he was commissioned a Major in the Shropshire Yeomanry, but left in 1950.

His elder brother Owen having died in 1935, Ormsby-Gore became Lord Harlech on the death of his father in 1964.

== Career ==
=== Member of Parliament ===
At the 1950 general election, he was elected Member of Parliament for Oswestry, which he remained until 1961. Under Prime Minister Anthony Eden he served briefly, from November 1956 to January 1957, as Parliamentary Under-Secretary of State for Foreign Affairs; and under Prime Minister Harold Macmillan he was from 1957 to 1961 Minister of State for Foreign Affairs. After the election of U.S. President John F. Kennedy he was appointed British Ambassador to the United States on 18 October 1961. This meant that he had to take the Chiltern Hundreds on 1 June, so that he could resign from the House.

=== Ambassador to the United States ===
Ormsby-Gore knew Kennedy well from his time in London, where his father Joseph P. Kennedy had served as American Ambassador. Like Macmillan, Ormsby-Gore was distantly related to Kennedy, but had a closer relationship than did Macmillan with the President-elect and his brother Robert. Six months after Kennedy took office Ormsby-Gore was in Washington, D.C. Referred to under the Kennedy administration as "our kind of Ambassador", he supplied Kennedy with a stream of advice and Cuban cigars via his diplomatic bag. He was almost a resident at the White House, being more a friend of the family than a mere ambassador. After President Kennedy's assassination there were rumours of a romance between Ormsby-Gore and Jacqueline Kennedy. In 1968 he proposed marriage to her, but, she did not accept. Ormsby-Gore was one of the pallbearers at Robert F. Kennedy's funeral along with Robert McNamara, John Glenn, W. Averell Harriman, C. Douglas Dillon, Kirk Lemoyne Billings (schoolmate of John F. Kennedy), Stephen Edward Smith (husband to Jean Ann Kennedy), David Hackett, Jim Whittaker and John Seigenthaler. Under the Lyndon B. Johnson administration relations were more formal but remained excellent; and Ormsby-Gore maintained his position after the Labour government took power in Britain in 1964.

A fierce opponent of oil-barrel politics, Ormsby-Gore's terse dismissal of the phenomenon ran: "It would indeed be a tragedy if the history of the human race proved to be nothing more than the story of an ape playing with a box of matches on a petrol dump." The extent of his influence over the Kennedy administration is disputed. Unable to persuade the American government to agree with the British line over Yemen and the Congo, or to proceed with either a negotiated settlement with Soviet premier Nikita Khrushchev over Berlin or the Skybolt ballistic missile programme, he nevertheless played a significant role in the Cuban Missile Crisis and ensured that Britain's views were taken into account by the American government.

The friendships of Ormsby-Gore and Macmillan with John F. Kennedy helped secure the first Test-Ban Treaty in 1963. Macmillan and Ormsby-Gore had been attempting to achieve a test-ban treaty with the Russians for the past ten years, and won Kennedy over through letters from Macmillan and frank discussions between Ormsby-Gore and Kennedy. They persuaded him to act like a statesman and conclude Test-ban treaties with Russia and not fear being branded as an appeaser by political opponents in the United States.

Ormsby-Gore was a participant in what is referred to as a "twenty-five year conversation to do with the role of a leader in a democratic society". He encouraged Kennedy to remain focused on issues relevant to the world and the future, rather than attempting to protect himself politically.

According to the Duchess of Devonshire, who travelled with the British delegation to Kennedy's funeral in November 1963, Macmillan's successor as Prime Minister Alec Douglas-Home had wanted to appoint Ormsby-Gore as Foreign Secretary, but R. A. Butler had insisted on having this post as a condition of serving under Home. After Kennedy's assassination, Ormsby-Gore became involved in a relationship with his widow Jacqueline, going on vacation with her in Cambodia. He proposed marriage to her in 1967 and was turned down. In 1968, when she married the Greek shipping tycoon Aristotle Onassis, Lord Harlech was opposed and wrote to her asking her to change her mind.

=== Later life ===
Ormsby-Gore retired as ambassador in 1965, a year after his father died, and took his seat in the House of Lords as Lord Harlech, briefly also holding the position of deputy chairman of the Conservative Party. He also had a successful career as a television executive, founding HTV, and served as president of the British Board of Film Classification from 21 July 1965 – his death on 26 January 1985) (died in office). He had an active interest in the avant-garde, and for nearly ten years, beginning in 1969, was patron of the Institute for Research in Art and Technology. In 1971–1972, he was a deputy chairman of the Pearce Commission. In 1972, with actor Stanley Baker, Harlech staged a four-day pop festival near Lincoln.

== Personal life ==
On 9 February 1940, Lord Harlech married Sylvia Lloyd Thomas (1920–1967) daughter of Hugh Lloyd Thomas, Envoy Extraordinary and Minister Plenipotentiary to France between 1935 and 1938, and Guendaline Ada Bellew. Before Lady Harlech's death in an automobile accident on 30 May 1967, they had five children:

- Julian Hugh Ormsby-Gore (1940–1974), who died of gunshot wounds, an apparent suicide.
- Jane Teresa Denyse Ormsby-Gore (b. 1942), who was said to have had an affair with Mick Jagger during the 1960s; some consider the Rolling Stones song "Lady Jane" to be about her. She married Michael Rainey in 1966 (div. 1984) and lived at Brogyntyn Home Farm, Oswestry.
- Victoria Mary Ormsby-Gore (1946–1995)
- Alice Magdalen Sarah Ormsby-Gore (1952–1995), who was the girlfriend of Eric Clapton from 1969 to 1974. She died of a heroin overdose in 1995.
- Francis David Ormsby-Gore, 6th Baron Harlech (1954–2016), who married Amanda Jane Grieve (b. 1959), daughter of Alan Grieve.

In 1968, Lord Harlech proposed to the widowed Jacqueline Kennedy, whom he had been friends with since before her husband's assassination. Jacqueline Kennedy declined his offer of marriage in a letter, writing: "If ever I can find some healing and some comfort — it has to be with somebody who is not part of all my world of past and pain ... I can find that now if the world will let us." She later married Aristotle Onassis.

On 11 December 1969, Lord Harlech married at Grosvenor Chapel, Mayfair, London, American socialite Pamela Colin, daughter of a Manhattan top corporate lawyer, herself a London resident editor of Vogue and then food editor of the British Vogue. The wedding was attended by Princess Margaret, the Duke and Duchess of Devonshire, the Earl and Countess of Drogheda, the Earl and Countess of Airlie, The Countess Gowrie, Lord and Lady David Cecil, Sir Fitzroy Maclean, J. J. Astor and Michael Astor. They had one daughter:

- Pandora Beatrice Ormsby-Gore (b. April 1972), who is the partner of actor Rory Kinnear, with whom she has two children.

=== Death ===
Lord Harlech was seriously injured in a car crash at Montford Bridge near Shrewsbury on the evening of 25 January 1985 and died at the Royal Shrewsbury Hospital the following morning, aged 66. Senator Edward Kennedy, Jacqueline Onassis and other Kennedy family members attended his funeral and interment in Llanfihangel-y-traethau. He was succeeded in the barony by his second and only surviving son, Francis.

Contents of Lord Harlech's house at Glyn Cywarch, including his government despatch box containing drafts from him and numerous letters from Jackie Kennedy illustrating their close relationship, were auctioned at Bonhams in London in September 2017 on behalf of his grandson after a preview in New York. The box (whose lock had had to be filed open) and its contents sold for over $40,000.

== In popular culture ==
Ormsby-Gore was portrayed by Peter Donat in the 1974 television play The Missiles of October, which was about the October 1962 Cuban Missile Crisis.

== Honours and arms ==
=== Honours and Crown appointments ===
Ormsby-Gore was appointed to be a Deputy Lieutenant of Shropshire on 12 April 1961. As the British Ambassador to the United States, he was, on 29 June 1961, appointed to the Order of St Michael and St George as a Knight Commander (KCMG). In 1962, he was appointed to the Order of St John as a Knight (KStJ).

=== Coat of arms ===
Coat of arms of David Ormsby-Gore, 5th Baron Harlech
Notes Coat of arms of the Ormsby-Gore family Coronet A coronet of a Baron Crest 1st: an Heraldic Tiger rampant Argent; 2nd: a Dexter Arm embowed in armour proper holding in the hand a Man's Leg also in armour couped at the thigh Escutcheon Quarterly: 1st and 4th, Gules a Fess between three Cross Crosslets fitchy Or (Gore); 2nd and 3rd, Gules a Bend between six Cross Crosslets Or (Ormsby) Supporters Dexter: an Heraldic Tiger Argent maned and tufted Sable ducally gorged Or; Sinister: a Lion Or Motto In Hoc Signo Vinces (Under this sign thou shalt conquer)

== Notes ==
Parliament of the United Kingdom
Preceded by Oliver Poole	Member of Parliament for Oswestry; 1950–1961	Succeeded by John Biffen
Political offices
Preceded by Douglas Dodds-Parker; Lord John Hope	Parliamentary Under-Secretary of State for Foreign Affairs; 1956–1957; With: Douglas Dodds-Parker	Succeeded by The Earl of Gosford; Ian Harvey
Preceded by Allan Noble	Minister of State for Foreign Affairs; 1957–1961; With: Allan Noble 1957–1959; John Profumo 1959–1960	Succeeded by Joseph Godber
Diplomatic posts
Preceded by Harold Caccia	British Ambassador to the United States; 1961–1965	Succeeded by Sir Patrick Dean
Media offices
Preceded by The Lord Morrison of Lambeth	President of the British Board of Film Classification; 1965–1985	Succeeded by The Earl of Harewood
Peerage of the United Kingdom
Preceded by William Ormsby-Gore	Baron Harlech; 1964–1985; Member of the House of Lords (1965–1985)	Succeeded by Francis Ormsby-Gore
