= Francis Ormsby-Gore, 6th Baron Harlech =

British peer

The Right Honourable The Lord Harlech

Member of the House of Lords
- Lord Temporal
- In office 26 January 1985 – 11 November 1999 as a hereditary peer
- Preceded by: The 5th Baron Harlech
- Succeeded by: Seat abolished (Note: Pursuant to the House of Lords Act 1999.)

Personal details
- Born: Francis David Ormsby-Gore; 13 March 1954
- Died: 1 February 2016 (aged 61) Talsarnau, Wales
- Party: Conservative
- Spouse: Amanda Jane Grieve (m. 1986; div. 1998)
- Children: Jasset David Cody Ormsby-Gore; Tallulah Sylvia Maria Ormsby-Gore
- Parents: The 5th Baron Harlech; Lady Sylvia Thomas
- Relatives: Alice Ormsby-Gore (sister)
- Education: Worth School

Francis David Ormsby-Gore, 6th Baron Harlech (13 March 1954 – 1 February 2016), was a peer in the United Kingdom. In 1985 he inherited the property in Wales and the Harlech title from his father.

== Early life ==
His parents were David Ormsby-Gore, 5th Baron Harlech, a Conservative politician and British Ambassador to Washington in the Sixties, and his wife Sylvia 'Sissie' Lloyd Thomas.

Francis was born the youngest of five children— the second son of a second son— and only inherited due to some tragic deaths. The fourth Baron's eldest son was killed at the age of 19 in a car accident. Thus Francis's father became heir and later succeeded as the 5th Baron. Francis's older brother died in what was suspected to be a suicide in 1974 making Francis the heir.

Francis's father was a childhood friend of John F. Kennedy — a relationship that remained strong in adulthood. John F. Kennedy and Jacqueline Kennedy were close to his sociable parents, with US President Kennedy calling David 'the wisest man I ever knew', and leaning on him for support during the Cuban Missile Crisis. His father became deputy Conservative leader in the Lords and set up the Welsh TV station Harlech Television (HTV Wales), — later pursued the widowed Jackie Kennedy.

He was educated at Worth School, a private Catholic school in West Sussex. He left school at 16. His mother died in a car crash in 1967 when he was only 12. In 1969 his father married the American socialite Pamela Colin, a former London editor of American Vogue. His elder brother Julian committed suicide in 1974, making him the heir to the Harlech barony.

The five Harlech siblings became the nexus of the fashionable Sixties 'hippieocracy', a bohemian set where aristocracy mingled with emerging Rock and Roll royalty in Swinging London. His elder sister, Jane, was a friend of The Rolling Stones and dated Mick Jagger. It was widely thought that she was the inspiration for the hit song Lady Jane. His youngest sister, Alice, at just 17, became engaged to Eric Clapton, who was then 25. During this time she developed a heroin addiction.

The siblings put their names on the books of English Boy, a model agency founded by the Queen's page-turned-hippie, Sir Mark Palmer, 5th Baronet. When Palmer bought a gipsy caravan and set off, the siblings set up their own commune – on the family estate in Shropshire. The idea, they explained, was to form a "peace circus to bridge the gap between children who are rich and children who have nothing". The siblings by then were referred to in society columns as the 'Harlech hippies'.

In an attempt to avoid inheritance tax, their father had made over some of his property to his eldest son Julian. But in 1974 Julian shot himself dead at the age of 33, making him the heir to the title. Ormsby-Gore eventually succeeded his father in 1985, as the sixth Baron Harlech, after his father death in a car crash.

He sat as a Conservative member of the House of Lords until the removal of the hereditary peers in 1999.

Harlech lived at his ancestral seat the Palladian Brogyntyn Hall near Oswestry, which he sold in 2001 and later at The Mount, Racecourse Road, Oswestry. He also owned Glyn Cywarch, his 4,200-acre estate in Talsarnau, Gwynedd in Wales.

== Personal life ==
In 1986, Harlech married Amanda Jane Grieve, a daughter of solicitor Alan Grieve, a director of the Jerwood Foundation, and his first wife, Anne Dulake. She was a fashion journalist who would become the muse of, first, John Galliano and later Karl Lagerfeld.

Before Lord and Lady Harlech were divorced on 31 August 1998, they had a son and a daughter:

- Jasset David Cody Ormsby-Gore, 7th Baron Harlech (born 1 July 1986), who studied at Central St Martins, and who was elected to take Lord Elton's seat in the House of Lords in 2021.
- Tallulah Sylvia Maria Ormsby-Gore (born 16 May 1988).

In 2011, it was revealed that he had been sectioned under the Mental Health Act.

He died of natural causes on 1 February 2016. A North Wales Police spokesman said, "North Wales Police were called to an address at Talsarnau near Harlech at 11.40am on Monday, following reports of the sudden death of a man in his 60s."

== Titles ==
- 13 March 1954 – 14 February 1964: Master Francis David Ormsby-Gore
- 14 February 1964 – 26 January 1985: The Honourable Francis David Ormsby-Gore
- 26 January 1985 – 1 February 2016: The Right Honourable The Lord Harlech

Coat of arms of Francis Ormsby-Gore, 6th Baron Harlech
| Notes Coat of arms of the Ormsby-Gore family Coronet A coronet of a Baron Crest 1st: an Heraldic Tiger rampant Argent; 2nd: a Dexter Arm embowed in armour proper holding in the hand a Man's Leg also in armour couped at the thigh Escutcheon Quarterly: 1st and 4th, Gules a Fess between three Cross Crosslets fitchy Or (Gore); 2nd and 3rd, Gules a Bend between six Cross Crosslets Or (Ormsby) Supporters Dexter: an Heraldic Tiger Argent maned and tufted Sable ducally gorged Or; Sinister: a Lion Or Motto In Hoc Signo Vinces (Under this sign thou shalt conquer) |

== Notes ==
Peerage of the United Kingdom
| Preceded by David Ormsby-Gore | Baron Harlech; 1985–2016; Member of the House of Lords (1985–1999) | Succeeded by Jasset Ormsby-Gore |
