= Listed buildings in Selattyn and Gobowen =

Selattyn and Gobowen is a civil parish in Shropshire, England. It contains 31 listed buildings that are recorded in the National Heritage List for England. Of these, one is listed at Grade I, the highest of the three grades, one is at Grade II*, the middle grade, and the others are at Grade II, the lowest grade. The parish contains the villages of Gobowen and Selattyn, and smaller settlements, and is otherwise rural. Most of the listed buildings are houses, cottages, farmhouses, and farm buildings, the earliest of which are timber framed or have timber-framed cores. In the parish are two country houses and a church, which are all listed, together with structures associated with them. The other listed buildings include a disused limekiln, two milestones, a lock-keeper's cottage, a railway station and an associated cottage, and a war memorial.

== Key ==
Grade	Criteria
I	Buildings of exceptional interest, sometimes considered to be internationally important
II*	Particularly important buildings of more than special interest
II	Buildings of national importance and special interest

== Buildings ==
Name and location	Photograph	Date	Notes	Grade
St Mary's Church; 52.89871°N 3.09197°W		13th century	The tower dates from 1703–04, the north transept from 1821, the south transept from 1828, and the church was restored in 1892 by C. Hodgson Fowler, when the porch and north aisle were added. The church is built in gritstone and Conglomerate, and the roof is tiled. It consists of a nave and a chancel in one cell, a south porch, a north aisle, north and south transepts, and a west tower. The tower has three stages, diagonal buttresses, an embattled parapet with corner pinnacles, and a weathercock.	I
Preeshenlle Old Hall; 52.90473°N 3.03453°W	—	Early 16th century	The house was considerably altered and extended in the 17th century and later. The original part was timber framed, this has been encased or rebuilt in red brick, the later parts are in red brick, and the roof is partly slated and partly tiled. The 17th-century part has a T-shaped plan, with the 16th-century part consisting of two bays attached to the right of the short range. The 16th-century part has one storey and an attic, a casement window, a gabled eaves dormer, and a doorway with a gabled hood. The later part has two storeys and an attic, a chamfered plinth, floor bands, pilaster strips, and segmental-headed casement windows. The doorway has a moulded surround, and there is a 19th-century lean-to in the angle at the rear.	II
Pen-y-Cae; 52.90247°N 3.03447°W	—	Late 16th to 17th century	A farmhouse, later a private house, that has been altered. The early part is timber framed with brick infill, partly rendered, but largely rebuilt in red brick, and with a slate roof. There is one storey and attics, and an L-shaped plan, with two ranges of similar length. The right range has a doorway with a pedimented hood. The left range is gabled, and contains a gabled porch. The gable has fretted bargeboards and a dentilled storey band. The windows in both ranges are casements, and there are gabled eaves dormers in both ranges.	II
Smithy Cottage; 52.89828°N 3.09219°W	—	17th century (probable)	A limestone cottage with a slate roof, two storeys, two bays, a lean-to on the right, and an extension recessed on the left. The windows are casements, there is a wide buttress on the left, and inside is an inglenook fireplace.	II
Ebnal Hall and walls 52.90450°N 3.02214°W	—	c. 1700	A farmhouse in red brick on a stone plinth with rusticated quoins, floor bands, a moulded eaves cornice, and a hipped slate roof. There are two storeys and an attic, seven bays, and two gables at the rear. The windows are cross-windows, and there are three gabled eaves dormers. Attached to the house is a garden wall in red brick with coping in stone and concrete, enclosing a rectangular area about 60 metres (200 ft) by 20 metres (66 ft).	II
Preeshenlle Farmhouse; 52.90509°N 3.03388°W	—	1734	The farmhouse is in red brick with floor bands and a tile roof. There are two storeys and an attic, three bays, and a later two-storey extension recessed on the left. The doorway has a gabled hood, above it is a moulded datestone, and the windows are casements.	II
Brogyntyn Hall; 52.87291°N 3.07231°W		1735–36	A country house that was enlarged in 1814–16 by Benjamin Gummow, it is in stuccoed red brick, with a sill band, a moulded eaves cornice, a parapet, and a balustrade. There are two storeys, an attic and a cellar. In the centre of the south front is a pedimented portico with four giant unfluted Ionic columns in Coade stone, with a coat of arms in the pediment. The west front has five bays, and contains two canted bay windows, and the east front has 13 bays with a two-storey canted bay window, and a full-length balustraded terrace in front.	II*
Ebnal Lodge; 52.90256°N 3.02078°W	—	1738	A brick farmhouse with a dentilled eaves cornice and a slate roof. There are two storeys and an attic, three bays, and two parallel gabled ranges at the rear. In the centre is a gabled trellised porch, in the ground floor are French windows, elsewhere the windows are sashes with segmental heads, and there are three gabled eaves dormers.	II
Barn at N.G.R. SJ 2733 3233; 52.88361°N 3.08135°W	—	1740	A timber framed barn with red brick infill on a limestone plinth with a slate roof. There are two levels, and it contains square-headed doorways, rectangular openings in the upper level, and rectangular air vents.	II
Churchyard wall and lych gate, St Mary's Church; 52.89845°N 3.09159°W		18th century (probable)	The wall encloses a roughly oval-shaped churchyard, and is in limestone and conglomerate with triangular-shaped coping. Part of a Celtic cross-head has been incorporated in the wall. The lych gate is dated 1892, and consists of a timber-framed gabled structure on low stone walls. It has a tile roof and cusped bargeboards.	II
Stable block, Henlle Hall; 52.91187°N 3.03287°W	—	Late 18th century	The stable block attached to the house is in red brick with a dentilled eaves cornice and a hipped slate roof. There are two levels, a main rectangular block, and a short range at right angles to the right. On the ridge to the right is a pyramidal lantern. The openings include doorways, windows, eaves hatches, and blind arches with imposts, most of which have segmental heads.	II
Henlle Hall; 52.91164°N 3.03313°W	—	1794	A country house in brick with a floor band, a moulded eaves cornice, and slate roofs. There are two storeys and three bays, the middle bay having an attic under a pedimented gable. In the centre three steps lead up to a Tuscan doorway with an entablature and a segmental pediment. The windows are sashes with grooved lintels and projecting keystones. The main block is flanked by single-storey pavilions.	II
Former lock-keeper's cottage 52.90614°N 2.99954°W		c. 1801	The cottage on the west side of the Llangollen Canal is in brick with pilaster strips and a hipped slate roof. There are two storeys and two bays. The windows are casements, those in the ground floor with segmental heads, and on the left return is a gabled porch.	II
Gate piers, Brogyntyn Hall; 52.87325°N 3.07268°W	—	Early 19th century	The gate piers between the stable block and the house are in sandstone. They have moulded plinths and capping, and are surmounted by ball finials.	II
Tunnel under drive, Brogyntyn Hall; 52.87935°N 3.07573°W	—	Early 19th century (probable)	The tunnel is in limestone, and consists of a single elliptical arch with a projecting keystone. There are revetment walls to the banks on the east and west.	II
Stable block, Brogyntyn Hall; 52.87321°N 3.07291°W	—	Early 19th century	The stable block is in red brick, partly stuccoed and partly rendered, with slate roofs, hipped in the rear range. There are four ranges forming a square plan round a courtyard. At the entrance is a round arch with a keystone and moulded imposts, and above is a pediment containing a clock face, and an open octagonal cupola with a domed bronze cap and a weathervane. In the left range is a bell under a gabled canopy. The right range contains four segmental-headed arches. The windows, which are sashes, and the fanlights have segmental heads.	II
Disused limekiln 52.87096°N 3.11665°W	—	Early 19th century (probable)	The disused limekiln is in limestone, and consists of a single segmental arch with voussoirs.	II
Pentre-Clawdd Farmhouse and cowhouse 52.88200°N 3.04285°W	—	Early 19th century	The farmhouse is in red brick with a dentilled eaves cornice and a slate roof. There are two storeys and three bays. The doorway has pilasters and a bracketed hood, and the windows are sashes with segmental heads. The attached cowhouse contains two true cruck trusses from a 15th-century open hall house. It is also in brick with a slate roof, and contains casement windows. Inside there is an inglenook fireplace.	II
Swiss Cottage; 52.87471°N 3.08413°W	—	Early 19th century	Aa estate cottage, it is in rendered limestone with a two-span gabled slate roof. There are two storeys at the front and one at the rear. The doorway has a fanlight and a gabled hood, and the windows are casements. At the rear is a three-sided verandah, the sides having arcades of three and two bays, with brick pillars on the corners and wooden posts between. The verandah is placed around a pedimented brick and stone block faced with quartzite.	II
Milestone at NGR SJ 3011 3413; 52.90012°N 3.04035°W		1826–27	The milestone is on the west side of the former London to Holyhead road. It is in limestone and carries a slightly recessed cast iron plate inscribed with the distances in miles and furlongs to Holyhead and to "SALOP" (Shrewsbury).	II
Milestone at NGR SJ 3020 3259; 52.88619°N 3.03865°W		1826–27	The milestone is on the east side of the former London to Holyhead road. It is in limestone and carries a slightly recessed cast iron plate inscribed with the distances in miles and furlongs to Holyhead and to "SALOP" (Shrewsbury).	II
Derwen House; 52.88843°N 3.02652°W	—	1831	A house, later part of a college, it is stuccoed, and has a hipped slate roof with deep bracketed eaves. There are two storeys and an attic, three bays, and later extensions. In the centre of the east front is a projecting stone porch with pairs of unfluted Greek Doric columns, the windows are sashes, and there are two hipped eaves dormers.	II
Bridge at NGR SJ 24953 30901; 52.87032°N 3.11637°W	—	c. 1836	The bridge, designed by Edward Haycock, carries the B4580 road over the River Morda. It is in limestone and consists of a single semicircular arch. The bridge has a flat string course, coped parapets, and corner piers.	II
Pentre-pant; 52.87949°N 3.06111°W	—	c. 1840	The house was extended in 1895. It is in brick on the front and sides, in limestone at the rear, all pebbledashed, and has a moulded eaves cornice, and a hipped slate roof with a parapet at the rear. There are two storeys and five bays. In the centre is a Tuscan doorcase with a pediment, and the windows are sashes.	II
Gobowen railway station and station name boards 52.89368°N 3.03745°W		1848	The station was built for the Shrewsbury–Chester line and was designed by Thomas Penson in Italianate style. It is in stuccoed red brick on a moulded stone plinth, and has hipped slate roofs. There are two storeys, and at the south end is a three-storey tower with a modillioned eaves cornice and a pyramidal roof with a finial. At the north end is a semicircular apse. The windows are sashes, most with round heads and some with flat heads. The doorway is approached by three steps. At the ends of the platforms are name boards on cast iron columns.	II
Former level-crossing keeper's cottage 52.89401°N 3.03747°W	—	c. 1848	The cottage was designed by Thomas Penson in Italianate style for the Shrewsbury–Chester line. It is in stuccoed red brick on a stone plinth, and has a hipped slate roof. There is a single storey and an L-shaped plan. In the centre is a doorway that has an architrave with a moulded entablature on carved consoles, and the windows are sashes.	II
Terrace, balustrade and steps, Brogyntyn Hall; 52.87254°N 3.07168°W	—	Mid 19th century	The terrace, balustrade and steps are in sandstone. At the southeast end are gate piers that have moulded plinths and capping and ball finials, and contain wrought iron gates. Further on is a ha-ha consisting of a limestone wall extending for about 250 metres (820 ft).	II
Oakhurst Hall; 52.87254°N 3.06205°W	—	1853	A small country house in Jacobean Revival style. It is in stone, with quoins, a floor band, and hipped slate roofs with ridge tiles. There are two storeys and cellars, fronts of three and five bays, and a service range to the north around a courtyard. In the centre of the west front is a porch that has a moulded round arch with ornamental pilasters, imposts, and keystones. The south front contains a central full-height canted bay window, and between the east front and the service range is a bay window with sashes.	II
Estate buildings, Oakhurst Hall; 52.87183°N 3.06335°W	—	1853	The estate buildings to the southeast of the house are in brick, faced in stone, with stone dressings and slate roofs. There is an L-shaped plan, and the buildings are in one and two storeys. They contained farm buildings, a coach house, a workshop, and a stable, and at the east end of the north range is a cottage. The areas are enclosed by stone walls containing two pairs of gate piers with domed caps.	II
Model Farmbuildings, Trewern; 52.88852°N 3.04953°W	—	c. 1875	The buildings on the model farm are in yellow Ruabon brick with slate roofs. They are arranged around two yards, and have one and two storeys. The entrance front is in Italianate style, it is symmetrical, and stretches across both yards. The front contains round-arched cart entries, and at each end is a three-bay pavilion with a pedimented gable containing a lunette.	II
Gobowen War Memorial; 52.89477°N 3.03783°W		1922	The war memorial stands near a road junction and consists of a cenotaph in limestone. On the east face are white marble tablets containing the names of those lost in the two world Wars. On the north and south faces are carved wreaths, and all faces carry inscriptions.	II
