= Sam Faulkner =

Photographer and filmmaker

- Occupations: photographer and filmmaker
- Website: www.samfaulkner.co.uk

Sam Faulkner is a photographer and filmmaker based in London.

== Life and work ==
From 2009 until 2014 Faulkner worked on a series of portraits made on the battlefield of Waterloo in Belgium.

Over the summer of 2015, the work was exhibited at Somerset House, in London to commemorate the 200 anniversary of the Battle of Waterloo. The exhibition was designed and curated by Patrick Kinmonth. Faulkner's book, Unseen Waterloo: The Conflict Revisited, had the publisher Impress and was released to coincide with the exhibition.

== Awards ==
- 1995: Ian Parry Scholarship for young Photographers for his work from Afghanistan.
- 2001: Observer Hodge Award for his ongoing work on the war on drugs.
- 2005 Winston Churchill Memorial Trust Fellowship for his ongoing work on the war on drugs.
- 2008 BJP Project Assistance Award for ongoing work about the war on drugs
- 2010 Getty Grant For Good for work on female genital mutilation in Mali
