= Tallulah Harlech =

British aristocrat, model and actress

The Honourable Tallulah Harlech
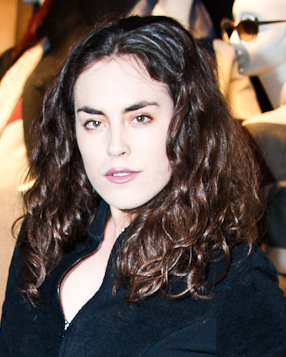
- At a Fendi store opening
- Born: Tallulah Sylva Maria Ormsby-Gore; 16 May 1988 (age 38); Oswestry, Shropshire, England
- Other name: Ormsby-Gore
- Occupations: Fashion stylist; actress; consultant
- Organization(s): Pop magazine and Arena Homme +
- Known for: Fashion
- Notable work: Styling Adidas tubular campaigns with photographer Mark Borthwick
- Parents: Francis Ormsby-Gore, 6th Baron Harlech (father); Amanda Grieve (mother)
- Relatives: Jasset David Cody Ormsby-Gore (brother)

Tallulah Sylva Maria Ormsby-Gore, known professionally as Tallulah Harlech, (born 16 May 1988) is an English fashion stylist, actress, and consultant notable for her styling work in both Pop Magazine and Arena Homme +. She is the daughter of Amanda Harlech and the late Francis Ormsby-Gore, 6th Baron Harlech. She was born in Shropshire.

== Early life ==
Harlech is the second child of Francis Ormsby-Gore, 6th Baron Harlech and Amanda Grieve. Her maternal grandfather is Alan Grieve. As a child, Harlech and her brother spent their summer breaks at Karl Lagerfeld's house in Biarritz. After finishing Cheltenham Ladies' College at age 18, she applied to Lee Strasberg Theatre and Film Institute in New York where she remained for two and a half years.

== Career ==
=== Modeling ===
In 2007, Harlech went to New York City where she began assisting in fashion which was followed by her working for John Galliano and Karl Lagerfeld at Chanel. In 2016, she appeared on the Jonathan Baron's Baron magazine and in 2017 was one of the models invited to Alexa Chung's fashion shows at the Danish Church of Saint Katherine in North West London.

=== Acting ===
As an actress, Harlech was known for appearing in such films such as Spite and Malice and well as a part in a Broadway play Richard III in which she played a wife of Richard III, the latter played by Anatol Yusef.

In 2013, she appeared in a short film sponsored by Chanel called Once Upon a Time... along with Keira Knightley, Stella Tennant, Saskia de Brauw and Lindsey Wixson playing the role of Ève Lavallière.

== Personal ==
She helped her mother Amanda Harlech restore the 17th-century Harlech family home, Glyn Cywarch, in north Wales. She has established the "Syla" brand for sensitive skin.
