= Richard Jones (cricketer, born 1871) =

English cricketer and British Army officer (1871–1940)

Personal information
- Full name: Richard Tyrrell Jones
- Born: 28 June 1871; Selattyn, Shropshire, England
- Died: 31 August 1940 (aged 69); Knolton Bryn, Flintshire, Wales
- Batting: Right-handed
- Bowling: Right-arm medium

Domestic team information
- Years: Team
- 1890–1892: Oxford University

Career statistics
Competition	First-class
Matches	10
Runs scored	310
Batting average	15.50
100s/50s	–/1
Top score	63
Balls bowled	20
Wickets	0
Bowling average	–
5 wickets in innings	–
10 wickets in match	–
Best bowling	–
Catches/stumpings	2/–
- Source: Cricinfo, 28 August 2019

Richard Tyrrell Jones (28 June 1871 – 31 August 1940) was an English first-class cricketer and British Army officer.

Jones was born in June 1871 at Selattyn, Shropshire, son of John Jones, of Mossfields, Whitchurch, Shropshire. He was educated at Eton College, before going up to New College, Oxford.

While studying at Oxford, he made his debut in first-class cricket for Oxford University against the Gentlemen of England at Oxford in 1890. He played first-class cricket for Oxford until 1892, making nine appearances. He scored a total of 258 runs in his nine matches, at an average of 14.33 and a high score of 63. In addition to playing first-class cricket for Oxford, Jones also appeared in a single match for H. Philipson's XI against Oxford University in 1891.

Below first-class cricket, he played at county level for Staffordshire, and for Shropshire between 1889 and 1905, appearing in 59 two-day matches, in which he scored a total 1,591 runs (with century achieved in one match, when he scored 118 runs) and took 71 wickets. He played at club level for Shrewsbury, Oswestry and Ludlow.

After graduating from Oxford, Jones was commissioned into the Shropshire Yeomanry as a second lieutenant in May 1896, with promotion to the rank of lieutenant in February 1900. Jones served in the Second Boer War with the Imperial Yeomanry, during the course of which he was promoted to the rank of captain. Following the war, he commanded the Shropshire Yeomanry detachment that took part in lining the procession route at the Coronation of Edward VII in 1902 and resigned his commission in April 1904. He served again with them at his previous rank in World War I, accompanying the regiment to Egypt in 1916. He was demobilised in 1919. In 1934 he was appointed a Justice of the Peace for Shropshire.

Jones married in 1911 Mary Ethel, daughter of Edward Herbert Wood, of Raasay, Inverness-shire. He died at Knolton Bryn in Flintshire in August 1940.
