= Halkyn Castle =

Mansion house in Flintshire, Wales

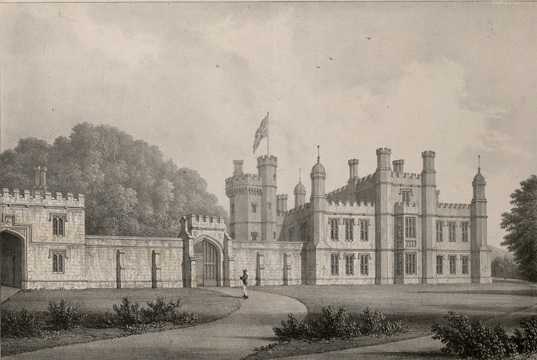
- Halkyn Castle in 1826
- Interactive map of Halkyn Castle
- 53.2293°N 3.1857°W
- Location: Halkyn, Flintshire, Wales

History
- Built: 1824–1827; 1866
- Built for: Robert Grosvenor, 1st Marquess of Westminster; Hugh Grosvenor, 1st Duke of Westminster

Site notes
- Architect(s): John Buckler; Douglas & Fordham
- Architectural style: Tudor Revival

Listed Building – Grade II*
- Designated: 26 November 1996
- Reference no.: 17792

Halkyn Castle (Welsh: Castell Helygain) is a mansion house in the village of Halkyn, Flintshire, Wales. The house, with its associated stable block, is designated by Cadw as a Grade II* listed building.

== History ==
The house was designed by the architect John Buckler and built between 1824 and 1827 for Robert Grosvenor, who was at the time the 2nd Earl Grosvenor, and later the 1st Marquess of Westminster. The building of the castle was supervised by Benjamin Gummow, the Earl's architect and surveyor. It was used as a sporting lodge and, on occasions, for living accommodation. In 1886 the Chester firm of architects, Douglas and Fordham, added an extension in Elizabethan style for the 1st Duke of Westminster. The extension consisted of a wing containing a new drawing room. Internal alterations were made which included a staircase, and a chimneypiece in the dining room.

After the Grosvenor family disposed of the property, it was purchased by Charles Oxley with a view to establishing a fourth independent school but planning permission was not granted. He therefore used the castle for school trips and charitable purposes.

== Architecture ==
The house is built in buff ashlar stone. Most of the windows are mullioned and transomed. Its more striking architectural features include castellated walls, towers, turrets, and many chimney stacks.

== Grounds ==
Of the original grounds of Halkyn Castle there is still a grand but mainly informal garden and a small park dating from when the house was constructed. Walks have been laid out through an informal ornamental woodland, a small formal terraced garden and a small ornamental walled garden.

== Listing ==
Halkyn Castle is a grade II* listed building as it is an early example of a castellated mansion, which is still well preserved, and was built by an important practitioner of the style for an equally significant regional aristocratic family.

The parks and gardens are listed as Grade II in the Cadw/ICOMOS Register of Parks and Gardens of Special Historic Interest in Wales.

== See also ==
- List of houses and associated buildings by John Douglas
