= Baron Elton =

Barony in the Peerage of the United Kingdom

Baron Elton, of Headington in the County of Oxford, is a title in the Peerage of the United Kingdom. It was created on 16 January 1934 for the historian Godfrey Elton. As of 2023 the title is held by his grandson, the third Baron, who succeeded in that year. The Elton family is descended in male line from Richard Elton (c. 1630–1695) who resided at Newent, Gloucestershire.

== Barons Elton (1934) ==
- Godfrey Elton, 1st Baron Elton (1892–1973)
- Rodney Elton, 2nd Baron Elton (1930–2023)
- Edward Paget Elton, 3rd Baron Elton (born 1966)

The heir apparent is the present holder's son, the Hon. Charles William Paget Elton (b. 2010).

== Line of succession ==
- Godfrey Elton, 1st Baron Elton (1892–1973)
  - Rodney Elton, 2nd Baron Elton (1930–2023)
    - Edward Paget Elton, 3rd Baron Elton (b. 1966)
      - (1) Hon. Charles William Paget Elton (2010–)

== Coat of arms ==
Coat of arms of Baron Elton
Notes Coat of arms of the Elton family Coronet A coronet of a Baron Crest Between two pierced Mullets and out of a Wreath of Laurel fructed Or, a Dexter Arm embowed in Mail proper, tied about the elbow a Cord Or, the Gauntlet grasping a Scimitar proper, hilted and pommeled Or. Escutcheon Paly Or and Gules, a Bend Sable, and on a Chief of the last three pierced Mullets Or. Supporters Dexter: a Knight in Mail and White Surcoat supporting with the exterior hand a Sword point downwards proper hilted and pommeled Or; Sinister: a Viking habited proper, mantled Azure, supporting with the exterior hand a Battleaxe head downwards and outwards proper. Motto Fide Quam Fortuna (By faith rather than fortune)
