= Selattyn and Gobowen =

Civil parish in Shropshire, England

Coordinates: 52°53′57″N 3°5′22″W

Selattyn and Gobowen is a civil parish in Shropshire, England. The smaller village of Selattyn is in the west of the parish, and the larger village of Gobowen in the east. The civil parish population at the 2011 census was 4,016.

== See also ==
- Listed buildings in Selattyn and Gobowen
