= Godfrey Elton, 1st Baron Elton =

British historian, academic and Labour Party politician

The Right Honourable The Lord Elton
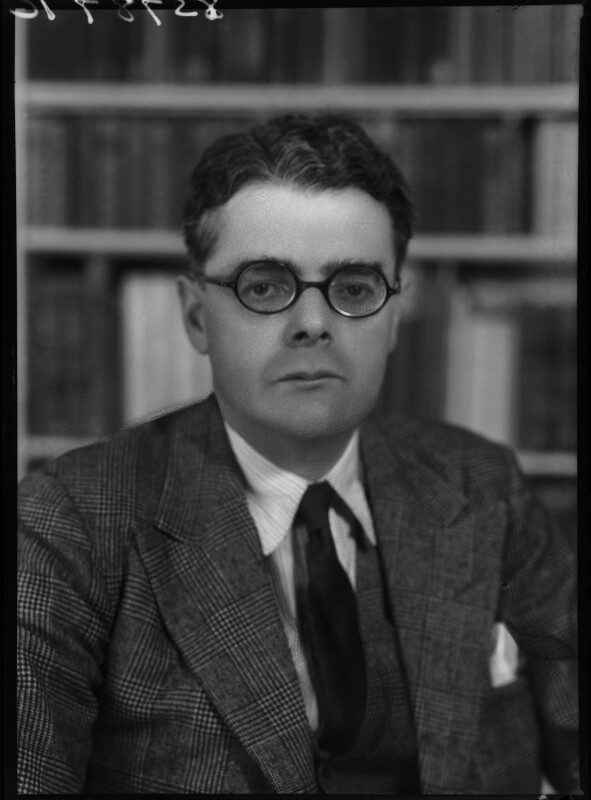

Member of the House of Lords
- Lord Temporal
- as a hereditary peer 16 January 1934 – 18 April 1973
- Preceded by: Peerage created
- Succeeded by: The 2nd Baron Elton

Personal details
- Born: 29 March 1892 Sherington, Oxfordshire, England
- Died: 18 April 1973 (aged 81) Sutton Bonington, Nottinghamshire, England
- Party: Labour
- Other political affiliations: National Labour (1931–1945)
- Education: Balliol College, Oxford

Godfrey Elton, 1st Baron Elton (29 March 1892 – 18 April 1973), was a British historian, academic and Labour Party politician. Having served in the British Army during the First World War, he was elected a fellow of The Queen's College, Oxford in 1919 and appointed a lecturer in modern history by the University of Oxford. In 1934, he entered the House of Lords, having been made a peer by Ramsay MacDonald. He stepped down from his university posts in 1939 and became secretary of the Rhodes Trust.

== Early life ==
Elton was born on 29 March 1892 in Sherington, Oxfordshire, England. He was the eldest son of Edward Fiennes Elton and his wife Violet Hylda Fletcher. He was educated at Rugby School, then an all-boys public school (i.e. independent boarding school). At Balliol College, Oxford, he first studied Literae humaniores (i.e. classics), and gaining a first class in Moderations in 1913. He then changed course to study history. However, he never took his finals as, following the outbreak of the First World War, he volunteered for the British Army.

== Career ==
=== Military service ===
On 19 September 1914, he was commissioned into the Hampshire Regiment as a second lieutenant. He was assigned to the 4th Battalion. He was promoted to lieutenant (temporary) on 29 November 1914. He fought in the Mesopotamian campaign and was wounded during the siege of Kut-el-Amara. After Kut fell in April 1916, he was taken prisoner by the Turks. He spent the rest of the war in captivity, continuing his interest in history "so far as conditions allowed".

=== Academic career ===
After the war Elton was elected a Fellow of Queen's College, Oxford, in 1919, and was lecturer in modern history from 1919 to 1939, dean of the college between 1921 and 1923 and tutor from 1927 to 1934. In 1923 he published The Revolutionary Idea in France, 1789–1878.

In 1939 Elton gave up his teaching fellowship at Queen's College and the same year he became secretary of the Rhodes Trust, a post he held until 1959.

=== Author ===
Elton was the author of several books, notably a biography of Ramsay MacDonald, entitled The Life of James Ramsay MacDonald 1866–1919. In 1938 he published his autobiography, Among Others. In 1954 he published a biography of General Charles Gordon.

Elton's writings were cited by George Orwell in his famous essay Notes on Nationalism as a prime example of what Orwell characterised as "Neo-Toryism".

=== Political career ===
Elton was also involved in politics. He joined the Labour Party shortly after the end of World War I and stood unsuccessfully for Thornbury in the 1924 and 1929 general elections. He was a strong supporter of Ramsay MacDonald, whose son Malcolm MacDonald had been his pupil at Oxford, and followed him into National Labour.

In the 1934 New Year Honours, it was announced that Elton was to be made a baron "for political and public services". On 16 January 1934, he was raised to the peerage as Baron Elton, of Headington in the County of Oxford. Elton's somewhat controversial elevation to the peerage caused fellow historian Lewis Namier to remark: "In the eighteenth-century peers made their tutors under-secretaries; in the twentieth under-secretaries make their tutors peers" (Malcolm MacDonald was at the time serving as Under-Secretary of State for Dominion Affairs). Lord Elton was a frequent speaker in the House of Lords and a member of several government committees.

== Personal life ==
Lord Elton married Dedi, daughter of Gustav Hartmann of Oslo, Norway, in 1921. They had three children, one son and two daughters:

- Hon. Audrey Elton (born 22 June 1922)
- Hon. Rosemary Elton (22 January 1925 – 2 June 2017)
- Rodney Elton, 2nd Baron Elton (2 March 1930 – 19 August 2023)

Lord Elton died at the Dower House in Sutton Bonington, Nottinghamshire on 18 April 1973 aged 81. His son Rodney succeeded him in the peerage and became a Conservative government minister. Lady Elton died in 1977.

== Coat of arms ==
Coat of arms of Godfrey Elton, 1st Baron Elton
| Notes Coat of arms of the Elton family Coronet A coronet of a Baron Crest Between two pierced Mullets and out of a Wreath of Laurel fructed Or, a Dexter Arm embowed in Mail proper, tied about the elbow a Cord Or, the Gauntlet grasping a Scimitar proper, hilted and pommeled Or. Escutcheon Paly Or and Gules, a Bend Sable, and on a Chief of the last three pierced Mullets Or. Supporters Dexter: a Knight in Mail and White Surcoat supporting with the exterior hand a Sword point downwards proper, hilted and pommeled Or; Sinister: a Viking habited proper, mantled Azure, supporting with the exterior hand a Battleaxe head downwards and outwards proper. Motto Fide Quam Fortuna (By faith rather than fortune) |

Peerage of the United Kingdom
| New creation | Baron Elton; 1934–1973 | Succeeded by Rodney Elton |
