= Patrick Kinmonth =

British opera director and designer, filmmaker and writer

Patrick Charles Kinmonth
- Born: 27 August 1957 (age 69)
- Occupations: director, designer, filmmaker and writer

Patrick Charles Kinmonth (born 27 August 1957) is an Anglo-Irish opera director and designer, filmmaker, writer, painter, interior designer, art editor, creative director and curator. He is known for his many stage, costume, interior and architectural designs. Kinmonth works principally as an opera director, and has been awarded for his work as exhibition curator and designer.

== Early life ==
Patrick Charles Kinmonth is the youngest of four children. His father, Maurice Kinmonth (1917–2009), was a consultant plastic surgeon, who encouraged Patrick's talent for drawing. He attended Uppingham School and later, in 1977, studied English Language and Literature at Mansfield College, University of Oxford He also enrolled as an associate student at The Ruskin School of Drawing and Fine Art.

During his undergraduate years at Oxford, he regularly participated in theatre productions at the Oxford Playhouse and elsewhere as director, designer and actor. He also became the art director of The Isis (the Oxford University magazine). After graduating with a first-class degree in 1979, Kinmonth moved to Venice to continue his work as a painter and lecturer on modern art and poetry. In 1981, Patrick returned to the UK and won the British Vogue's Talent Competition. He was appointed as arts editor of Vogue and has since contributed articles on emerging artists, designers, architects, and directors to various publications including British Vogue, Vogue Italia, American Vogue and Vanity Fair.

== Career ==
=== Vogue and beyond ===
Kinmonth's role at British Vogue included creative direction for fashion and portraiture shoots. He commissioned work from, and collaborated with, many renowned photographers, ranging from André Kertész, Jacques Henri Lartigue and Horst to David Bailey, Mario Testino, Tessa Traeger and Bruce Weber. Kinmonth established working relationships with Testino and Traeger for Vogue. In 2003 Kinmonth curated A Gardener's Labyrinth: Portraits of People, Plants and Places, an exhibition of Traeger's photography for the National Portrait Gallery, and wrote the text for the eponymous book, translated into Dutch and German.

Towards the end of the 1980s, Kinmonth returned to painting. His canvasses were exhibited by Richard Demarco Gallery at the International Contemporary Art Fair at Olympia and were used by Jasper Conran as scenic backdrops to complement his costume designs for David Bintley's one-act ballet Tombeaux for The Royal Ballet (1993).

=== Stage designs ===
Kinmonth began working with Robert Carsen in 1993. They first met in the mid-1980s during Carsen's time as a student actor at the Bristol Old Vic Theatre School. Carsen invited Kinmonth to design sets and costumes for his new production of Janáček's Káťa Kabanová for the Canadian Opera Company. Their collaboration evolved over the next decade to deliver critically acclaimed stagings of, among others, Handel's Semele (co-produced by Vlaamse Opera and English National Opera), Wagner's Ring des Nibelungen (Cologne Opera), and a notable series of operas by Janáček (Vlaamse Opera).

The Carsen-Kinmonth vision of Wagner's tetralogy, presented as a complete cycle in Cologne in 2004, became the first Ring to be staged in Shanghai, presented twice by Cologne Opera at the Shanghai Grand Theatre in September 2010. It has been called the "Green Ring" to reflect the staging's attention to ecological and environmental concerns. Kát'a Kabanová, conceived for Vlaamse Opera, has traveled extensively and was chosen to introduce the work to the Teatro alla Scala in 2006. It has also reached audiences in Tokyo, Strasbourg, Cologne and Madrid. The latter staging, filmed and subsequently released on DVD, was shortlisted for a Gramophone Award in 2009.

Kinmonth's set and costume designs for Carsen's staging of La Traviata were commissioned by La Fenice for the Venetian theatre's post-fire reopening in 2004. The production was presented in Tokyo (2005) and in Beijing (2006) and has become established as the traditional season opener at La Fenice: the Carsen-Kinmonth production of La traviata was revived at the beginning of 2007/08, 2009/10, 2010/11, 2011/12 and 2012/13 seasons.

In 2000, Kinmonth worked for the first time with the director Pierre Audi. Their production was Handel's Tamerlano for the Slottsteater. Baroque repertoire has occupied the center ground of Kinmonth's collaborations with Audi. They presented Handel's Alcina (2003) and Rameau's Zoroastre (2005) at Drottningholm in productions which, together with Tamerlano, have since been revived at De Nederlandse Opera. Kinmonth joined forces with fellow designers Chloe Obolensky and Jannis Kounellis in 2007 to work with Pierre Audi for De Nederlandse Opera's 'Monteverdi Evening', comprising Lamento d'Arianna, Il ballo della ingrate and Il combattimento di Tancredi e Clorinda. Audi and Kinmonth created a production of Handel's Partenope for Theater an der Wien in 2009 and in 2011 staged Vivaldi's Orlando furioso at the Théâtre des Champs-Elysées in Paris as well as in Nice and Nancy.

Kinmonth's experience of creative partnerships have underpinned recent collaborations with the Flemish opera director Guy Joosten (Richard Strauss's Elektra, co-produced by Gran Teatre del Liceu and La Monnaie) and Brazilian dancer and choreographer Fernando Melo. He has designed sets and costumes for three of Melo's original dance works: A Guest House, created for and first staged by Göteborgsoperans Danskompani (2010); Fountain, a 20-minute dance theatre work produced at the Staatstheater am Gärtnerplatz (2011), and Tending to Fall, also conceived for GöteborgsOperans (2012).

=== Opera direction ===
Whilst Intendant of Cologne Opera, Christoph Dammann invited Kinmonth to make his directorial debut with Puccini's Madama Butterfly for the German company's 2008/09 season. Kinmonth designed the production's sets and costumes (in collaboration with Darko Petrovic).

Kinmonth's production of Saint-Saëns's Samson et Dalila, created for the Deutsche Oper Berlin, opened in May 2011. He returned to the staging the following year, making revisions and overseeing its revival at the Grand Théâtre de Genève in November 2012. His new production of Don Giovanni ran from September 2012 to January 2013 at Theater Augsburg. The production was described as "a pleasure for the senses and the intellect" (Donau Kurier) and as "living, exciting musical theater" (Süddeutsche Zeitung).

Kinmonth was engaged by Cologne Opera to direct and design Franz Schreker's Die Gezeichneten. The production combined ideas inspired by film noir and Scandinavian detective series with artworks and visual imagery from the time of Rubens. In a survey by critics in North Rhine Westphalia, Die Gezeichneten was nominated by both Ulrike Gondorf (WDR/DLF/SWR) and Christian Wildhagen (FAZ) as 'Best Production' of the 2012/13 season.

=== Selected productions ===
==== As director and designer ====
- 2008 Madama Butterfly (co-designer with Darko Petrovic): Cologne Opera
- 2011 Samson et Dalila: Deutsche Oper Berlin; revived Grand Théâtre de Genève (2012); St Matthew Passion: Vocal Futures
- 2012 Don Giovanni: Theater Augsburg
- 2013 Die Gezeichneten: Cologne Opera; Rigoletto: Theater Augsburg; The Creation: Vocal Futures, London

==== As designer – sets and costumes (unless otherwise specified) ====
- 1994 Die Zauberflöte (dir. Robert Carsen): Aix-en-Provence Festival and Opéra de Lyon (1996)
- 1998 Semele (dir. Carsen): Vlaamse Opera; revived Aix Festival (1998) and English National Opera (1999). Revised production presented at Zurich Opera (2007). English National Opera's staging was broadcast on BBC2 and nominated for an Olivier Award.
- 1999 Die Zauberflöte (new production; dir. Carsen): Vienna Volksoper; Jenůfa (dir. Carsen): Vlaamse Opera
- 2000 Tamerlano (dir. Pierre Audi): Drottningholm Palace Theatre; Das Rheingold (dir. Carsen): Cologne Opera
- 2001 The Cunning Little Vixen (dir. Carsen): Vlaamse Opera; Die Walküre (dir. Carsen): Cologne Opera
- 2002 Siegfried (dir. Carsen): Cologne Opera; La clemenza di Tito (dir. Audi; costumes only): De Nederlandse Opera
- 2003 Alcina (dir. Audi): Drottningholm Palace Theatre; Götterdämmerung (dir. Carsen): Cologne Opera
- 2004 Der Ring des Nibelungen (dir. Carsen): Cologne Opera; La traviata (dir. Carsen): La Fenice; Kát'a Kabanová (dir. Carsen): Vlaamse Opera and Teatro alla Scala (2006)
- 2005 Zoroastre (dir. Audi): Drottningholm Palace Theatre
- 2007 Lamento d'Arianna, Il ballo delle ingrate and Il combattimento di Tancredi e Clorinda (dir. Audi; set co-designer with Chloe Obolensky, Jannis Kounellis, costume co-designer with Obolensky): De Nederlandse Opera
- 2008 Castor et Pollux (dir. Audi): De Nederlandse Opera; Elektra (dir. Guy Joosten): Gran Teatre del Liceu; Pelléas et Mélisande (dir. Audi; costumes only): La Monnaie
- 2009 Partenope (dir. Audi): Theater an der Wien
- 2010 A Guest House (choreographer, Fernando Melo): GöteborgsOperans Danskompani
- 2010 Orlando Furioso (dir. Audi): Théâtre des Champs-Élysées
- 2011 Fountain (choreographer, Fernando Melo): Staatstheater am Gärtnerplatz
- 2012 Tending to Fall (choreographer, Fernando Melo): GöteborgsOperans Danskompani

== Exhibitions and creative direction ==
Alongside his work for the stage, Kinmonth has achieved success as a creative director and exhibition curator. He first served as creative consultant to the Metropolitan Museum of Art in 2004, designing its exhibition Dangerous Liaisons: Fashion and Furniture in the 18th Century. Jayne Wrightsman, trustee of the museum's Wrightsman Galleries, was impressed by Kinmonth's work for Dangerous Liaisons and recommended that he should serve as consultant to the renovation and reinstallation of the galleries. The refurbished Wrightsman Galleries reopened on 30 October 2007.

Kinmonth-Monfreda Design Projects, founded in London in 2004, launched Kinmonth's collaboration with Italian art director Antonio Monfreda. They were employed as creative consultants to the exhibition AngloMania: Tradition and Transgression in British Fashion, presented at the Metropolitan Museum of Art New York in 2006. Their exhibition Valentino a Roma: 45 Years of Style offered a major retrospective of Valentino Garavani's work. The presentation, commissioned by Giancarlo Giammetti, included over 350 costumes and design sketches, photographs and personal memorabilia from Valentino's personal archives.

Kinmonth and Monfreda went on to conceive and design the exhibition Valentino: Themes and Variations for the Musée des Arts Décoratifs at the Palais du Louvre (2008) and Valentino: Master of Couture, specially designed for Somerset House to celebrate Valentino's 80th birthday year and the 50th anniversary of his couture label (2012). Their exhibition Making Dreams: Fendi and the Cinema opened at Cinema Manzoni, Milan in September 2013, and included their elegiac film homage Amphitheatre24 to Cinecittà directed by Kinmonth and Monfreda. This marked the first project by their company The Visual Clinic.

Kinmonth curated and designed Diana: Princess of Wales, an exhibition of iconic images and previously unseen photographs by Mario Testino created in 2005 for Kensington Palace. He has also worked as curator and designer for Testino's Todo o Nada (Thyssen Bornemisza, 2010; Palazzo Ruspoli, Rome, 2011; MATE Centre, Lima, 2012); In Your Face and British Royal Portraits (Boston Museum of Fine Arts, 2012–13), and Private View (Beijing Today Art Museum, 2012 and Shanghai Art Museum, 2012). British Royal Portraits is exhibited at the National Portrait Gallery (2012–13) and collaborated with Testino on his books: Portraits, Any Objections, Let Me In, Todo o Nada.

An exhibition of Kinmonth's artwork ET IN ARCADIA EGO opened at Maestro Arts Gallery in London on 27 November 2013.

== Architectural and interior design ==
Kinmonth-Monfreda Design Project designed the first Missoni Boutique in Los Angeles which opened in March 2010. They also delivered the architectural design for the virtual design of the pioneering 3-D architectural design of the Valentino Garavani Virtual Museum, launched online in December 2011.

== Awards ==
- Prix d'Italia 2006 for Best Opera Production, Kát'a Kabanová (Teatro alla Scala)
- Voted Wall Street Journal Magazine 2012 Innovator of the Year Award: Design
- Prix des critiques francophone for Elektra at La Monnaie, Brussels
- Prix d’Italia several times with Robert Carsen
- Die Gezeichneten voted best opera production of 2013 by Frankfurter Allgemeine/ wdr/ Süddeutsche Zeitung

== Writings ==
- Mr Potter's Pigeon
- Journalism consisting of writing for Vogue America, Vogue Italia, Vogue UK (1980–2013) as well as journals including Vanity Fair, Auditorium
- Introduction to Mario Testino, Any Objections? (Phaidon, 2004)
- Tessa Traeger A Gardener's Labyrinth: Portraits of People, Plants and Places
- Foreword to Allegra Hicks, An Eye for Design (New York: Abrams, 2010)
- Patrick Kinmonth, Anthony Fry: Paintings and Works on Paper, 2000–2011 (New York: Umbrage Editions, 2011)

== Videography ==
- La traviata at La Fenice, Zoroastre at Drottningholm,
- Semele (dir. Carsen; design Kinmonth; TV dir. Felix Breisach), Zurich Opera (2007), Decca DVD 0743326
- Il combattimento di Tancredi e Clorinda (dir. Audi; costume and set design Kinmonth, Obolensky & Kounellis; TV), Opus Arte DVD OA0972BD
- Kát'a Kabanová (dir. Carsen; design Kinmonth) Teatro Real, Madrid (2010), FRAProd FRA003
