= Tessa Traeger =

British photographer (born 1938)

Tessa Traeger (born 1938) is a British photographer. She is known for her still life and food photography, and has worked as an advertising photographer. Her work has been published in two books of her own; included in a number of books with others on gardening and food; exhibited in both solo and group exhibitions; and is held in the collections of the National Portrait Gallery and Victoria and Albert Museum, London.

== Biography ==
Traeger was born in Streatham, grew up in Sussex, and later relocated to London after completing college. She studied photography at Guildford School of Art.

Her initial work experience involved Queen magazine. At the age of 21, she received a £2,800 inheritance, which she used to purchase a Mini car for £500, a set of Nikon cameras, and the rent for her first studio, enabling her to start her freelance career.

== Career ==
She worked on the food pages for the British Vogue magazine for sixteen years, in partnership with food writer Arabella Boxer. Some of this work is collected in their 1991 book A Visual Feast, which won the André Simon Book Award.

In the 1990s, Traeger photographed the hill farmers and their traditional methods in a remote region of south-western France, resulting in her book Voices of the Vivarais (2010).

Her 2013 exhibition, Chemistry of Light, was made by photographing decaying 19th century glass plate negatives that she had inherited.

Her 2014 book, The Calligraphy of Dance, was made as part of an artist residency at Boughton House in Northamptonshire, England.

== Personal life ==
She was married to fellow photographer Ronald Traeger until his death from Hodgkin's disease in 1968, aged 31.

== Publications ==
=== Publications by Traeger ===
- Voices of the Vivarais. Self-published, 2010. OCLC 880682376. With an introduction by Mark Haworth-Booth. Edition of 250 copies.
- The Calligraphy of Dance. Impress, 2014. With an introduction by Liz Jobey.

=== Publications with contributions by Traeger ===
- The Summer & Winter Cookbook. London: Mitchell Beazley, 1980. With Arabella Boxer.
  - The Vogue Summer & Winter Cookbook. London: Mitchell Beazley, 1980. ISBN 9780855332167. Presented as two books bound together under one cover, Vogue Summer Cookbook and Vogue Winter cookbook.
  - Bon Appetit Summer & Winter Cookbook. Knapp Press, 1980. ISBN 9780895350367.
- A Visual Feast. Century, 1991. ISBN 9780712647922. With Arabella Boxer. A compilation of work for British Vogue from 1975 to 1991.
- Ronald Traeger: New Angles. By Martin Harrison and Traeger. Munich: Schirmer Mosel, 1999. ISBN 9783888143847. "Published to accompany the exhibition 'Triple Exposure: three photographers from the 60s' shown in the Canon Photography Gallery at the V & A, 16 September 1999 to 30 January 2000."
- A Gardener's Labyrinth: Portraits of People, Plants & Places. London: Booth-Clibborn Editions, 2003. ISBN 9781861542496. Photographs by Traeger and text by Patrick Kinmonth.
- I am Almost Always Hungry: Seasonal Menus and Memorable Recipes. New York: Stewart, Tabori & Chang, 2003. ISBN 9781584792871. By Lora Zarubin. Photographs by Traeger. With a foreword by Jay McInerney.
- Fern Verrow. London: Quadrille, 2015. ISBN 9781849495462. By Jane Scotter and Harry Astley. Photography by Traeger.
- 30 ingredients. London: Frances Lincoln, 2015. ISBN 9780711237520. By Sally Clarke. Photographed by Tessa Traeger.
- Robert Kime. London: Frances Lincoln, 2015. ISBN 9780711236639. Text by Alastair Langlands. Photographs by Traeger, Christopher Simon Sykes, James Mortimer, and Fritz von der Schulenburg.
- The Loveliest Valley: a Garden in Sussex. Bologna, Italy: Damiani, 2015. ISBN 9788862084413. Edited by Stewart Grimshaw. Photographs by Traeger.

== Exhibitions ==
=== Solo exhibitions ===
- Voices of the Vivarais, Purdy Hicks Gallery, London.
- Chemistry of Light, Purdy Hicks Gallery, London, January–February 2013.
- Tessa Traeger. The Calligraphy of Dance, January–February 2015, Purdy Hicks Gallery, London.

=== Exhibitions with others ===
- Three Ways, The Photographers' Gallery, London, February–March 1978. Work by Traeger, Burt Glinn, and Hans Feurer.
- A Gardener's Labyrinth, National Portrait Gallery, London, June–October 2003. Work by Traeger and Patrick Kinmonth. "50 specially commissioned portraits of Britain's leading horticulturalists."
- Machine Dreams: a New Technology, The Photographers' Gallery, London, September–November 1989. Work by Traeger, David Buckland, Graham Budgett, Calum Colvin, Mike Dean, Susan Derges, Steven Dowsing, Edwina Fitzpatrick, Adrian Flowers, and David Godbold.

== Awards ==
- Winner, André Simon Book Award, food category, André Simon Memorial Fund, Glasgow, UK, for the book A Visual Feast (1991) by Arabella Boxer and Traeger.

== Collections ==
Traeger's work is held in the following permanent collections:

- National Portrait Gallery, London
- Victoria and Albert Museum, London
