= Rodney Elton, 2nd Baron Elton =

British peer and politician (1930–2023)

The Right Honourable The Lord Elton
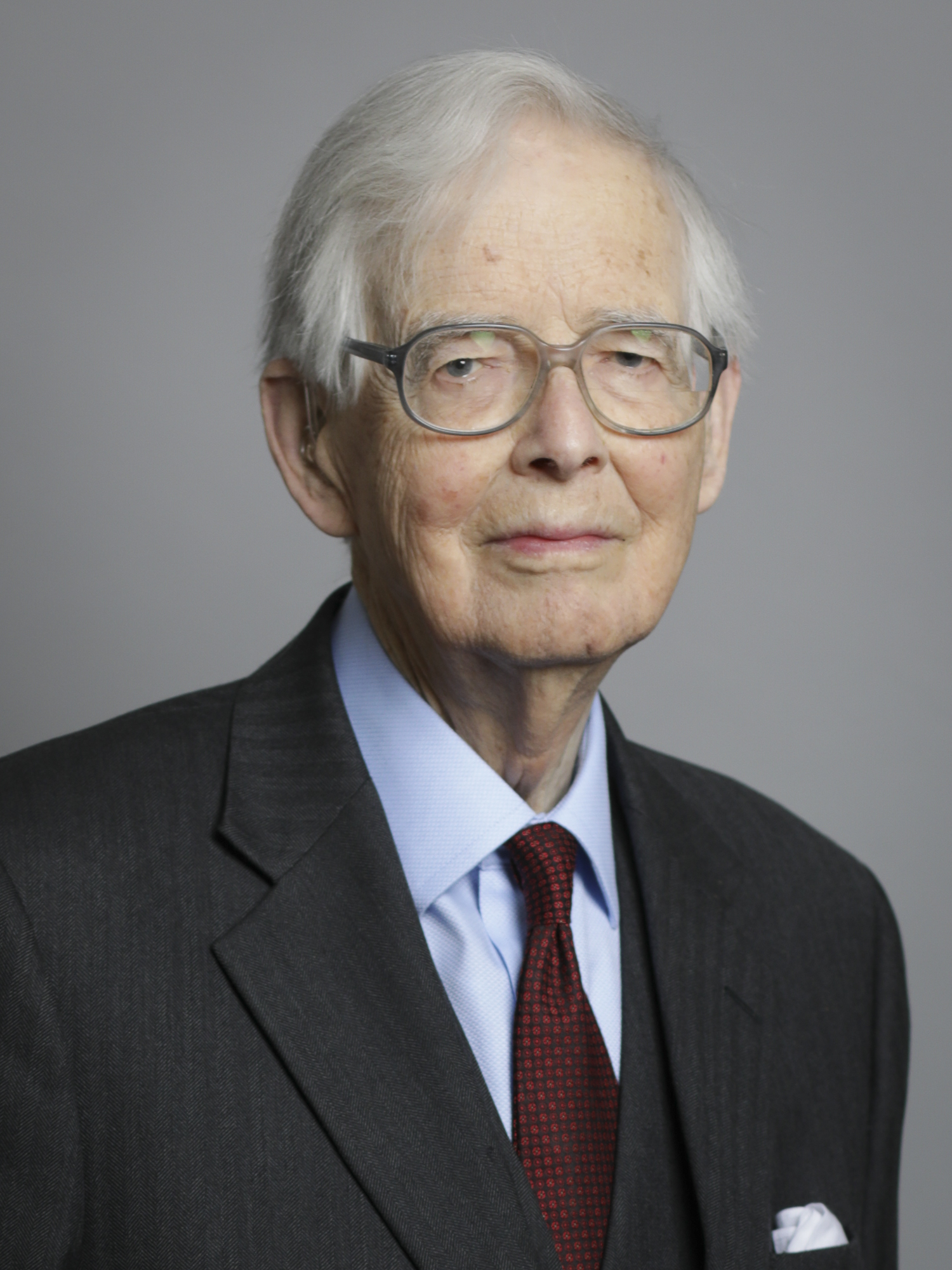
- Elton in 2020

Minister of State for Environment
- In office 27 March 1985 – 10 September 1986
- Prime Minister: Margaret Thatcher
- Preceded by: New appointment
- Succeeded by: Hon. William Waldegrave

Minister of State for Home Affairs
- In office 11 September 1984 – 25 March 1985
- Prime Minister: Margaret Thatcher
- Preceded by: Position established
- Succeeded by: Position abolished

Parliamentary Under-Secretary of State for Home Affairs
- In office 6 April 1982 – 11 September 1984
- Prime Minister: Margaret Thatcher
- Preceded by: The Lord Belstead
- Succeeded by: The Lord Glenarthur

Parliamentary Under-Secretary of State for Health and Social Security
- In office 15 September 1981 – 6 April 1982
- Prime Minister: Margaret Thatcher
- Preceded by: Geoffrey Finsberg
- Succeeded by: The Lord Trefgarne

Parliamentary Under-Secretary of State for Northern Ireland
- In office 7 May 1979 – 15 September 1981
- Prime Minister: Margaret Thatcher
- Preceded by: Tom Pendry
- Succeeded by: David Mitchell

Member of the House of Lords
- Lord Temporal
- Hereditary peerage 13 May 1973 – 11 November 1999
- Preceded by: The 1st Baron Elton
- Succeeded by: Seat abolished
- Elected Hereditary Peer; 11 November 1999 – 29 October 2020
- Election: 1999
- Preceded by: Seat established
- Succeeded by: The 7th Baron Harlech

Personal details
- Born: 2 March 1930
- Died: 19 August 2023 (aged 93)
- Party: Conservative

Rodney Elton, 2nd Baron Elton (2 March 1930 – 19 August 2023), was a British Conservative politician and member of the House of Lords.

== Biography ==
Rodney Elton was the son of Godfrey Elton, 1st Baron Elton, and his wife Dedi (née Hartmann). He was educated at Eton College and New College, Oxford, and succeeded to the peerage on his father's death in 1973. Between 1964 and 1967, he was a master at Loughborough Grammar School. Between 1967 - 69 he was a master at Fairham Comprehensive School, Nottingham.

On the formation of a Conservative government after the 1979 general election, Elton was made a Parliamentary Under Secretary of State at the Northern Ireland Office. In 1981 he was moved to the Department of Health and Social Security and in 1982 to the Home Office. In 1984 he was promoted to Minister of State within the Home Office. In 1985, Elton joined the Department of Environment, again as a Minister of State, but left the government the following year.

With the passage of the House of Lords Act 1999, Elton along with other hereditary peers lost his automatic right to sit in the House of Lords. He was, however, elected as one of the ninety hereditary peers allowed to remain in the House pending completion of House of Lords reform. Elton was a candidate to become Lord Speaker in the elections that took place at the end of June 2006, but he was defeated, Baroness Hayman ultimately winning. He retired from the House of Lords on 29 October 2020; a by-election to replace him was held 13–14 July 2021, in which Lord Harlech was elected to succeed him.

Elton died on 19 August 2023, at the age of 93.

== Marriages and children ==
Elton was married to Anne Frances Tilney, daughter of Brigadier Robert Tilney, on 18 September 1958. They had four children. Following a divorce in 1979, on 24 August 1979 Elton married Susan Richenda Gurney (born 1937), daughter of Hugh Gurney and a granddaughter of Lancelot Carnegie. There are no children of this marriage. Richenda was a Lady of the Bedchamber to Elizabeth II until The Queen's death in 2022.

== Styles ==
- 2 March 1930 – 16 January 1934: Rodney Elton
- 16 January 1934 – 18 April 1973: The Honourable Rodney Elton
- 18 April 1973 – 19 August 2023: The Right Honourable The Lord Elton

== Coat of arms ==
Coat of arms of Rodney Elton, 2nd Baron Elton
Notes Coat of arms of the Elton family Coronet A coronet of a Baron Crest Between two pierced Mullets and out of a Wreath of Laurel fructed Or a Dexter Arm embowed in Mail proper tied about the elbow a Cord Or the Gauntlet grasping a Scimitar proper hilted and pommeled Or Escutcheon Paly Or and Gules a Bend and on a Chief Sable three pierced Mullets Or Supporters Dexter: a Knight in Mail and White Surcoat supporting with the exterior hand a Sword point downwards proper hilted and pommeled Or; Sinister: a Viking habited proper mantled Azure supporting with the exterior hand a Battleaxe head downwards and outwards proper Motto Fide Quam Fortuna (By faith rather than fortune)

Peerage of the United Kingdom
Preceded by Godfrey Elton	Baron Elton; 1973–2023; Member of the House of Lords (1973–1999)	Succeeded by Edward Elton
Parliament of the United Kingdom
New office created by the House of Lords Act 1999	Elected hereditary peer to the House of Lords under the House of Lords Act 1999; 1999–2020	Succeeded by The Lord Harlech
