= Jasset Ormsby-Gore, 7th Baron Harlech =

British peer and politician

The Right Honourable The Lord Harlech
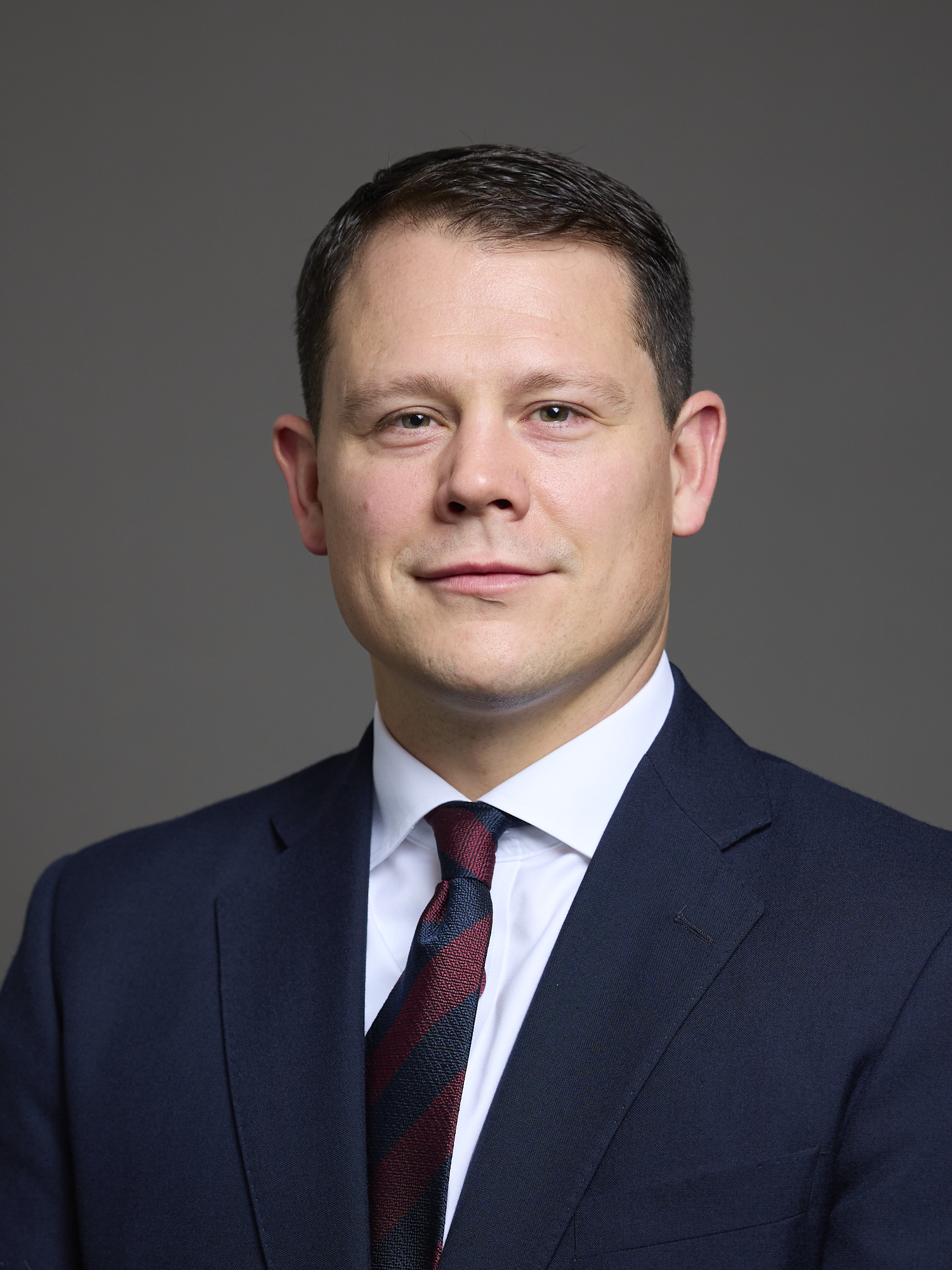
- Official portrait, 2024

Lord-in-waiting Government Whip
- In office 22 September 2022 – 5 July 2024
- Prime Minister: Liz Truss; Rishi Sunak

Member of the House of Lords Lord Temporal
- Incumbent
- Life peerage 16 June 2026
- Elected Hereditary Peer; 21 July 2021 – 29 April 2026
- By-election: 2021
- Preceded by: The 2nd Baron Elton
- Succeeded by: Seat abolished

Personal details
- Born: 1 July 1986 (age 40)
- Party: Conservative
- Spouse: Ida Lai (m. 2024)
- Parents: The 6th Baron Harlech; Amanda Harlech
- Education: Packwood Haugh School; Eton College
- Alma mater: Central Saint Martins
- Occupation: Politician and peer

Military service
- Allegiance: United Kingdom
- Branch/service: British Army
- Years of service: 2019–present
- Rank: Captain
- Unit: Coldstream Guards

Jasset David Cody Ormsby-Gore, 7th Baron Harlech, Baron Harlech of Glyn Cywarch (born 1 July 1986), is a British hereditary peer and Conservative member of the House of Lords. He served as a Lord in Waiting from September 2022 to July 2024.

In May 2026, it was announced that Harlech was to be given one of 26 new life peerages, returning him to the House of Lords after the coming into force of the House of Lords (Hereditary Peers) Act 2026.

== Personal life ==
Harlech is a great-great-great-grandson of Robert Gascoyne-Cecil, 3rd Marquess of Salisbury, who served as British prime minister. His father was Francis Ormsby-Gore, 6th Baron Harlech, a Conservative peer, and his mother is Amanda Ormsby-Gore (née Grieve), a creative consultant and writer. Due to his father's mental health issues, he describes his mother raising him and his sister "essentially as a single parent".

Harlech was educated at Eton College. He studied graphic design at Central Saint Martins art school, graduating with a bachelor's degree in 2008.

Harlech married Canadian Ida Lai in August 2024 at Islington Town Hall.

== House of Lords ==
Harlech sought election as a Liberal Democrat peer in 2017 "in order to stand for equality and progress".

Harlech became a member of the House in July 2021, being elected in a hereditary peers' by-election by the whole House. He took the oath on 22 July 2021. He made his maiden speech on 28 October 2021 during a debate on the Land Use Framework; talking about his father, being an army reservist, his life before joining the Lords and his love of the countryside.

He was the youngest member of the House of Lords from July 2021 to July 2023.

== Titles ==
- 1 July 1986 – 1 February 2016: The Honourable Jasset David Cody Ormsby-Gore
- 1 February 2016 – present: The Right Honourable The Lord Harlech

Coat of arms of Jasset Ormsby-Gore, 7th Baron Harlech
Notes Coat of arms of the Ormsby-Gore family Coronet A coronet of a Baron Crest 1st: an Heraldic Tiger rampant Argent; 2nd: a Dexter Arm embowed in armour proper holding in the hand a Man's Leg also in armour couped at the thigh Escutcheon Quarterly: 1st and 4th, Gules a Fess between three Cross Crosslets fitchy Or (Gore); 2nd and 3rd, Gules a Bend between six Cross Crosslets Or (Ormsby) Supporters Dexter: an Heraldic Tiger Argent maned and tufted Sable ducally gorged Or; Sinister: a Lion Or Motto In Hoc Signo Vinces (Under this sign thou shalt conquer)

Parliament of the United Kingdom
Preceded by The Lord Elton	Elected hereditary peer to the House of Lords under the House of Lords Act 1999; 2021–2026	Position abolished under the House of Lords (Hereditary Peers) Act 2026
Peerage of the United Kingdom
Preceded by Francis Ormsby-Gore	Baron Harlech; 2016–present	Incumbent; Heir: none currently
