= Selattyn =

Village in Shropshire, England

Coordinates: 52.898°N 3.090°W

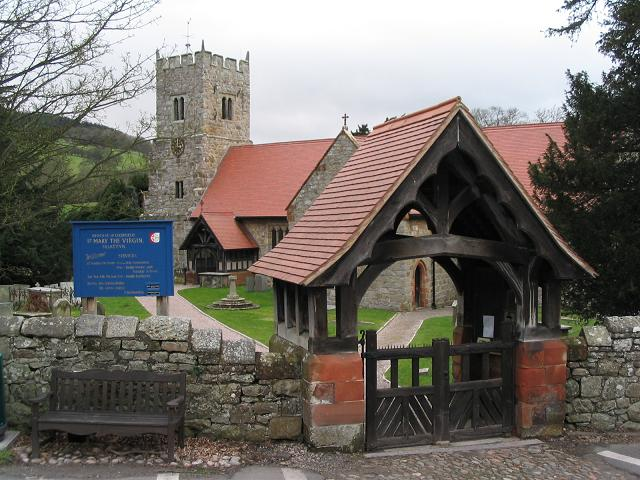
- St Mary's Church, Selattyn

- Location within Shropshire
- OS grid reference: SJ266339
- Civil parish: Selattyn and Gobowen
- Unitary authority: Shropshire
- Ceremonial county: Shropshire
- Region: West Midlands
- Country: England
- Sovereign state: United Kingdom
- Post town: OSWESTRY
- Postcode district: SY10
- Dialling code: 01691
- Police: West Mercia
- Fire: Shropshire
- Ambulance: West Midlands
- UK Parliament: North Shropshire

Selattyn is a village and former civil parish, now in the parish of Selattyn and Gobowen, in the Shropshire district, in the ceremonial county of Shropshire, England. It is on the England–Wales border, close to Oswestry. In 1961 the parish had a population of 1830. On 1 April 1967 the parish was abolished to form "Selattyn and Gobowen", part also went to Whittington.

The village is near Offa's Dyke, which bounds the parish on the west. The parish includes the townships of Upper and Lower Porkington (which was adapted into Welsh as Brogyntyn), and also the hamlet of Hengoed (Welsh for 'old forest'). The topography is undulating and well timbered, with soils of various qualities; the substratum abounds with limestone. There are quarries of good building-stone. Close to Selattyn lies the ruined Castle Brogyntyn dating to the 12th century. The area only became confirmed as part of Shropshire and therefore also a part of England in the 16th century. E. G. Ravenstein's look at the geographical extent of the Welsh language in 1878, from a lecture he gave in that year, reported Welsh services and Welsh being spoken in Selattyn and the surrounding area.

== Church of St Mary ==
The church, dedicated to St. Mary, stands in the middle of the village. It was first mentioned in Papal Tax records in 1291. The church is situated within an oval churchyard in which a number of extremely old Yew trees can be found. This points to the likelihood that Christian worship has been offered here for well over 1000 years. The bowl of the font dates from the 13th century and the beautiful barrel roof over the chancel is perhaps as old as the 14th century.

In the Middle Ages the church would have been a simple oblong, consisting of the nave and chancel, perhaps a tower. The internal nave roof timbers are from about the end of this period, namely the 15th century. The north and south transepts were not added until 1821–28. Then in 1891–92 the church was extensively rebuilt, with the addition of the north aisle and the red sandstone arches, while red roof tiles replaced slates. There are two Kempe windows in the church.

Inside the church is a framed First World War Roll of Honour listing parish men who served, indicating those among them who died, how and when. Nearby hang a picture and details of Selattyn's only Second World War loss, Robert Hanmer, killed returning from a bombing mission over Germany, with a display of his medals, pictures of the crash site and his grave. There is a memorial from the Boer War, in the form of a brass plaque, to Trooper G. Evans (Imperial Yeomanry), who died of fever at Mafeking in 1900. The parish is unique in England to have voted to belong to the disestablished Church in Wales.

The church was restored in 1996, and again in 2001.

The parish war memorial, in the churchyard, is in the form of a carved stone Celtic cross with names of the war dead of both World Wars.

Former rectors of the parish include Henry Sacheverell, who held the living from 1710 to 1713, despite having been suspended from preaching after being tried for politicised sermons he made in London. Former curates included, from 1859 to 1864, David Thomas, later Archdeacon of Montgomery and historian.

== Notable people ==
- Richard Jones (1871–1940), cricketer

== See also ==
- Listed buildings in Selattyn and Gobowen
