= Brogyntyn =

Country house in Shropshire, England

Coordinates: 52.8729°N 3.0723°W

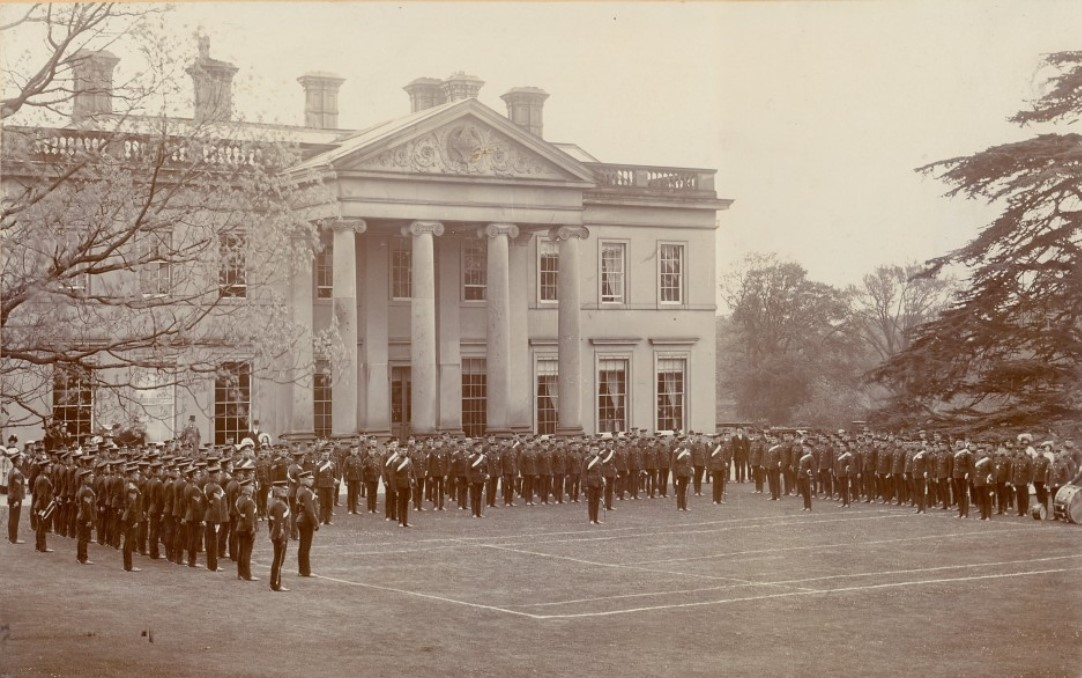
Brogyntyn Hall, Oswestry in 1905, with Shropshire Yeomanry parading outside the house.

Brogyntyn is a mansion in the parish of Selatyn to the north-west of Oswestry in Shropshire, England. Brogyntyn Hall was the home of the Ormsby-Gore family from 1815, and had previously been the estate of their ancestors the Maurices and Owens since the sixteenth century. It was abandoned and uninhabited from around 1985.

== History ==
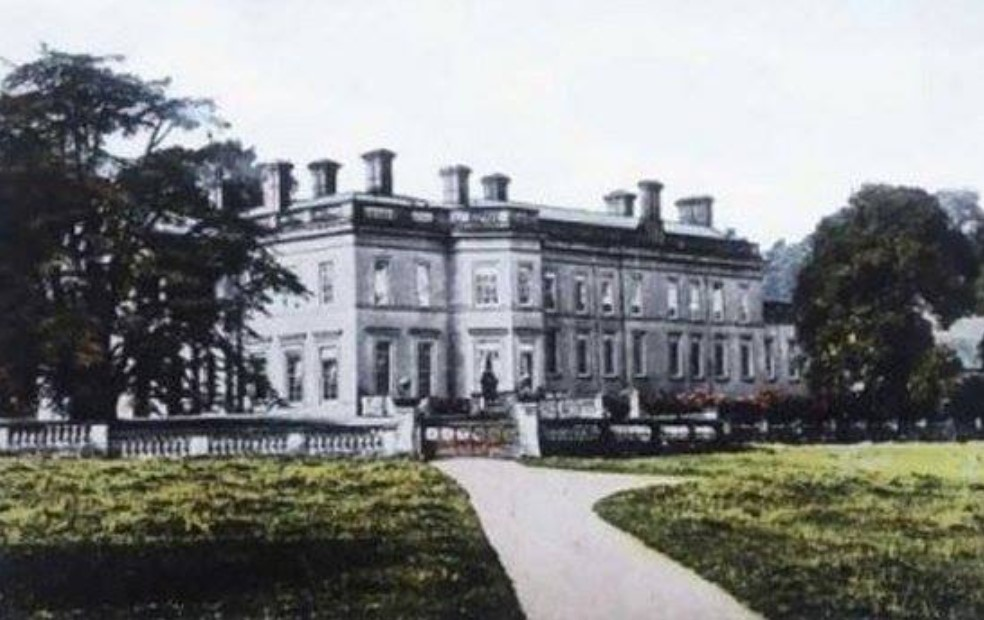
Brogyntyn Hall, the gardens

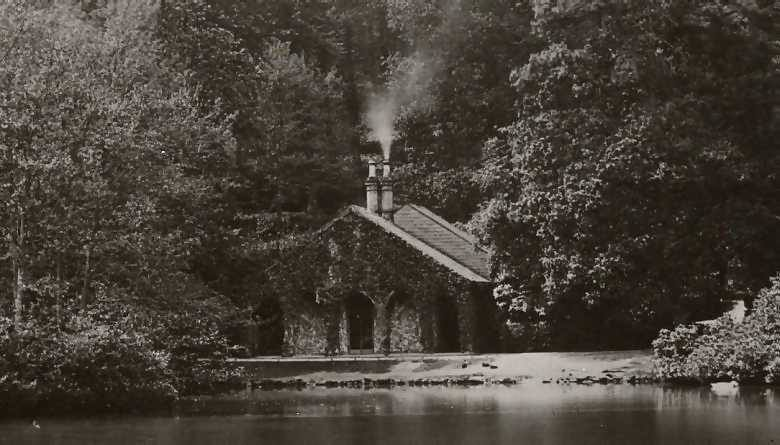
Brogyntyn Hall, Swiss house on the estate

It was a residence of members of the princely dynasty of the Welsh Kingdom of Powys, belonging to the House of Mathrafal, and one of the taî'r uchelwyr (houses of the gentry) in late medieval Wales. It subsequently came into the possession of the Ormsby-Gore family (Lord Harlech). A manuscript known to have been in the possession of Brogyntyn in 1574 was a copy of the Hanes Gruf(f)udd ab Cynan.

The house itself is of brick dating from circa 1730 refaced and much added to between 1813–20 by the architect Benjamin Gummow. It is noted for a portico of four giant unfluted Ionic columns with scrolls and pediment. Outside can be seen an arch with 2 pairs of unfluted Ionic columns. In the entrance hall survives an elaborately carved fireplace dated 1617.

Brogyntyn Hall and its 1,445-acre estate, was sold by the 6th Baron Harlech in 2001 for less than £5 million to a local developer, who divided up the estate, and investigated the potential for a retirement community development in and around the Hall. However, the Hall and 234 acres went up for sale for £5 million in December 2013.

=== Brogyntyn Library ===
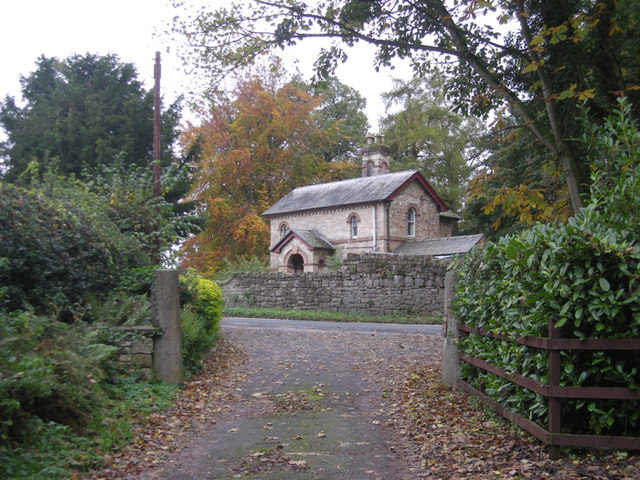
Lodge to Brogyntyn Park

It is known that Sir Robert Owen of Brogyntyn (d. 1698) was a bibliophile who continued the family's traditional patronage of poets and a collection of printed English literature was developed by his grandfather Lewis Anwyl of Park. Nevertheless, the early history of the library at Brogyntyn is obscure. Some of the family had collected early printed books during the nineteenth century, but this does not account for the fine collection of manuscripts that the library held.

There is some evidence contained within the manuscripts which suggests that the collection was formed circa 1700 from other manuscripts collections in the surrounding area. The thirty Welsh language manuscripts that the third Lord Harlech deposited in the National Library of Wales in 1934 was, at the time, the largest collection of manuscripts in Welsh that was still privately owned.

The fourth Lord Harlech deposited a further fifty-nine manuscripts in the National Library in 1938 and subsequently donated most of the deposits in 1945. The remaining items were purchased from the sixth Lord Harlech, the incumbent in 1993.

The manuscripts from the Brogyntyn Library include a medieval psalter and a version of Geoffrey of Monmouth's Historia Regum Britanniae, both from the thirteenth century, a fifteenth-century miscellany in Middle English, a volume of the Welsh laws of Hywel Dda, and pedigrees, genealogy and heraldry of families in Wales.

=== Telecommunications engineering centre ===
From 1957 the GPO moved its telecommunications engineering from Dollis Hill to the site. In 1982 the network management division moved to the National Network Management Centre. In the 1970s telecommunications engineering moved to Martlesham Heath in east Suffolk.

== See also ==
- Grade II* listed buildings in Shropshire Council (A–G)
- Listed buildings in Selattyn and Gobowen
