= Benjamin Gummow =

British architect (1766–1840)

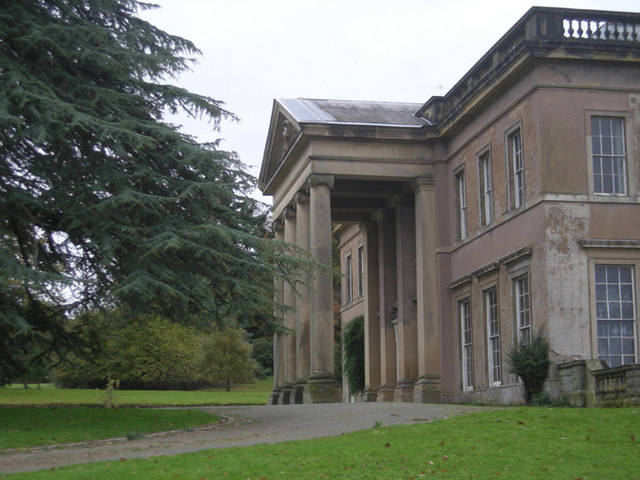
- Brogyntyn Hall, Oswestry
- Born: 1766; St Endellion, Cornwall
- Died: 1844 (aged 77–78); Ruabon, Wales
- Education: Probably a pupil of S P Cockerell
- Occupation: Architect
- Buildings: Eaton Hall, Cheshire

Benjamin Gummow (1766–1840) was an architect who worked from Ruabon near Wrexham in Wales. He worked almost exclusively for Sir Watkin Williams Wynn of Wynnstay, Ruabon and the Grosvenor family of Eaton Hall near Chester. He was born in St Endellion in Cornwall in 1766 and died at Ruabon in March 1844.

== Architectural career ==
Gummow is first noted as a clerk of the works for the architect Samuel Pepys Cockerell for the alterations to St Margaret's Church, Westminster from 1799 to 1802. Gummow was associated with the architect William Porden who had been a pupil of Cockerell; about 1785 Porden was appointed surveyor to the Grosvenor Estates. In 1802 Robert Grosvenor succeeded to the title of Earl Grosvenor, and shortly afterwards commissioned Porden to rebuild Eaton Hall near Chester. Gummow was appointed supervising architect for the project by Porden and at this time he moved to the Chester area. The project lasted between 1803 and 1814. Gummow and Porden did not get on too well and in 1807 Porden said to Earl Grosvenor that Gummow "speaks without thinking, and is the most inconsistent of men that I ever met". Gummow, apart from working at Eaton Hall also undertook the building of Littleton Hall, Christleton in Cheshire in 1806, additions to Nercwys Hall between 1813 and 1820 and the building of a portico and other alterations for the Ormsby-Gores at Brogyntyn, near Oswestry in Shropshire

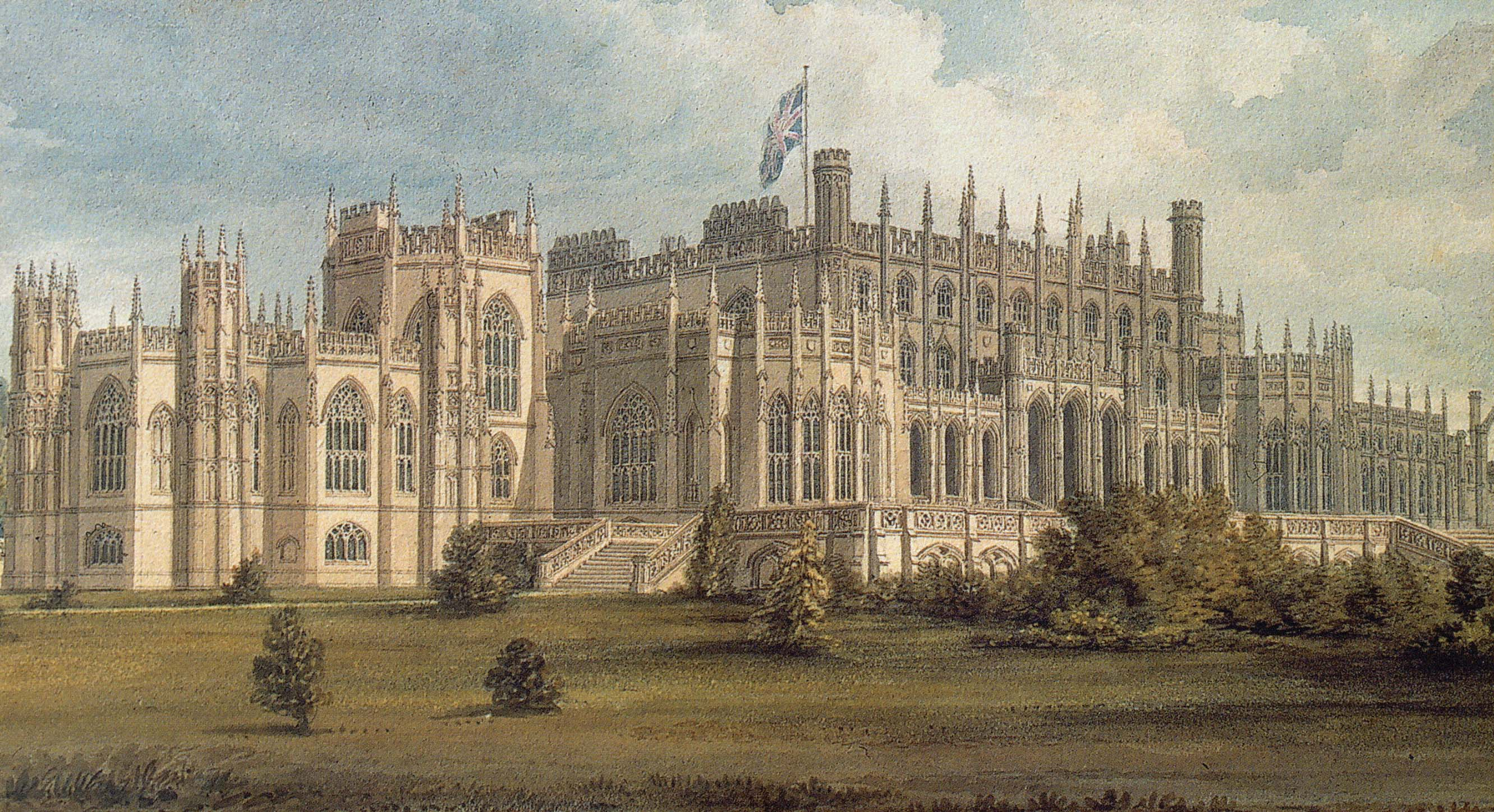
Eaton Hall. The additional wings on the left and right were the work of Benjamin Gummow

By 1819 he started to be employed as the surveyor of Sir Watkin Williams-Wynn of Wynnstay's estates at Ruabon near Wrexham. In 1821 Porden was forced to resign from the surveyorship of the Grosvenor Estates and Earl Grosvenor then appointed Gummow to add further Gothic wings to Eaton Hall. In doing this Gummow was working and modifying plans that had already been drawn up by Porden. Gummow was now working for both Sir Watkin and Earl Grosvenor and in 1827 he told Cockerell that "he has always had £300 per ann. from Lord Grosvenor and Sir W.W. and is not allowed any other charge or profits – but has his lodgings and livings – out of this he has saved an easy independence". He, however, did supervise the building, probably to plans by drawn up by John Buckler of Halkyn Castle, Flintshire (1824–27) and Pool Park, Denbighshire (c. 1827–28), re-casing and altering the house at Wynnstay as well the building of a porch at Chirk Castle in 1831. Sir Howard Colvin summed up Gummow's work as follows "Though not an architect of the first rank, his additions to Eaton Hall successfully maintained the elegant rococo Gothic of the main block designed by Porden and at Brogontyn his Ionic portico is a handsome addition to an existing classical house".

== Architectural works ==
=== Churches and chapels ===
- Chirk: In 1828–9 he undertook the provision and new seating in the church.
- Ruabon: The church was partly burnt in January 1819 and Gummow arranged the restoration for Sir Watkin Williams-Wynn Then in 1835–8 Gummow re-ordered and partly rebuilt the church to plans prepared by Edward Welch of Liverpool. The church was remodelled again by Benjamin Ferrey in 1870–72.
- Ruabon: Providence Wesh Presbyterian Chapel (Rhagluniaeth), 1834. Chapel built on land provided by Sir Watkin Williams-Wynn, who provided the services of the "competent architect", Benjamin Gummow.
- St Asaph Cathedral: Hubbard notes that some work was undertaken by Gummow at the Cathedral c.1810–11.
- St Giles, Wrexham 1820–1: Gummow designed a gallery for the church.

=== Country houses ===
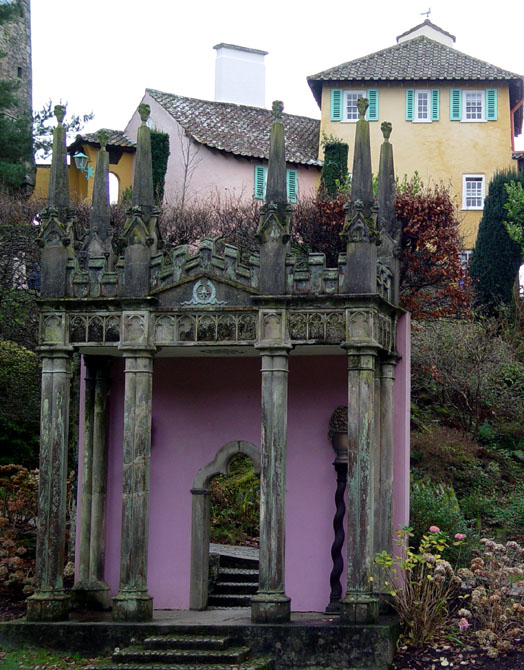
The Gothic 'Pavilion' at Portmeirion – Removed from Nerquis Hall

- Christleton, Littleton Hall. Built for Thomas Dixon in 1806 and now much altered.
- Nerquis Hall, Nercwys, Flintshire. Gummow added castellated Gothic wings, stable archway, Gothic orangery and porch in 1813–20. These were largely removed in 1964, but the porch has been preserved at Portmeirion.
- Brogyntyn, near Oswestry, Shropshire. Portico and other alterations for the Ormsby Gores, 1814–15. Gummow used Coade stone ornamentation on the interior of the portico
- Eaton Hall, Eccleston, near Chester. Wings added for 2nd Earl Grosvenor, 1823–6.

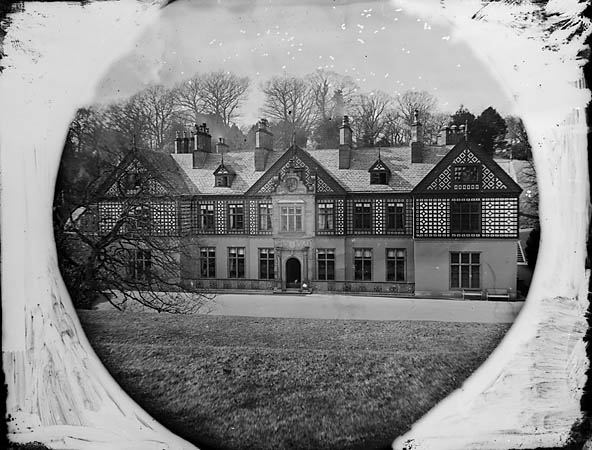
Pool Park, Ruthin

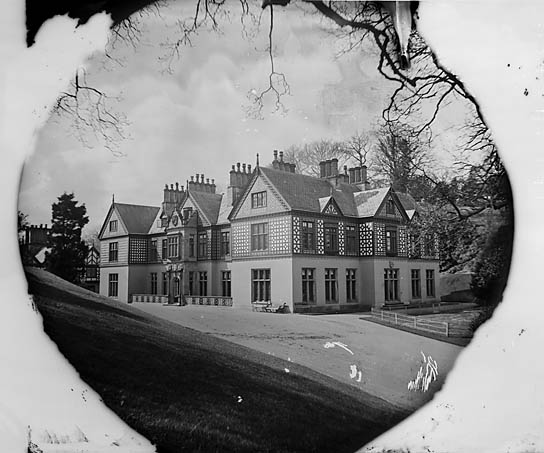
Pool Park, Ruthin

- Halkyn Castle, Flintshire. The house was designed by the architect John Buckler and built between 1824 and 1827 for Robert Grosvenor. The building of the castle was supervised by Benjamin Gummow, the Earl's architect and surveyor. Gummow may have submitted the initial plans for Halkyn Castle in 1804.
- Wynnstay, Ruabon. Probably responsible for altering and re-casing the house c.1825.
- Pool Park, Efenechtyd, Ruthin. Gummow supervised between 1827 the building of this timber framed "Tudor" building with a stone "Renaissance" style porch to plans provided by John Buckler. It was built for the Lord Bagot and the completed designs for the Pool Park were exhibited at the Royal Academy in 1830.
- Chirk Castle, Denbighshire. The building of a porch at Chirk Castle in 1831.

== The Gummows: a family of architects and builders ==
Benjamin Gummow is likely to be related to other architects and builders who were called Gummow and who were working in the Wrexham and Shrewsbury areas. However, in most cases the exact relationship between them is uncertain. Benjamin Gummow married Mary Ellis of Eccleston, the parish in which Eaton Hall stood, in 1810. As Gummow was 44, it appears this was his second marriage. Presumably this wife died and he embarked on a third marriage in 1827, when he married at Ruabon. Benjamin Gummow had a brother Michael Gummow (d. 1804) who was also an architect. Benjamin and Michael Gummow appear to have worked together on the rebuilding of Cleveland House St. James, Westminster around 1800.

== Literature ==
- Antonia Brodie (ed.) Directory of British Architects, 1834–1914. 2 vols, British Architectural Library, Royal Institute of British Architects, 2001
- Colvin, H. A Biographical Dictionary of British Architects 1600–1840. Yale University Press, 4th ed. London, 2008.
- Hubbard, E. The Buildings of Wales
- Lowe, R. Lost Houses in & around Wrexham, Landmark Publishing, Ashbourne, 2002. ISBN 978-1-84306-057-4.
- J. Newman and N. Pevsner The Buildings of England: Shropshire, Yale 2006.
- Peter N. Lindfield "Porden's Eaton. William Porden's role in the development of Eaton Hall, Cheshire, 1802–1825". Georgian Society Journal; Vol. XXI, 2010, 159.
