= Amanda Harlech =

British writer and creative consultant

- Born: Amanda Jane Grieve; 1958 (age 67–68); North London, England
- Education: South Hampstead High School; Marlborough College; Somerville College, Oxford (BA)
- Occupations: Creative consultant; writer; actress
- Years active: 1980s–present
- Known for: Work with John Galliano and Karl Lagerfeld
- Spouse: Francis Ormsby-Gore, 6th Baron Harlech (m. 1986; div. 1998)
- Children: Jasset Ormsby-Gore, 7th Baron Harlech; Tallulah Harlech
- Parent(s): Alan Grieve; Anne Dulake

Amanda Jane Ormsby-Gore, Baroness Harlech (née Grieve; May 1958), is a British creative consultant, writer and actress with a long association with the couturiers John Galliano and Karl Lagerfeld. She was named to the International Best Dressed List Hall of Fame in 1997.

== Early life ==
Amanda Jane Grieve was born in 1958 in north London, the daughter of Alan Grieve, a solicitor and director of the Jerwood Foundation, and his first wife, Anne Dulake. She grew up in Regent's Park where one of her childhood companions was Jasper Conran. She was educated at South Hampstead High School and Marlborough College before studying English at Somerville College, Oxford, specialising in the work of Henry James.

== Career ==
=== Fashion ===
Harlech worked with John Galliano during his years as an independent couturier. When Galliano joined Dior in 1996, she joined Karl Lagerfeld at Chanel. She also works as a consultant at Fendi.

In February 2014, Harlech, with Dominic Jones, started a jewellery collection called Harlot & Bones.

=== Writing and film ===
Harlech has collaborated on two books – Palazzo and Sicily – and has expressed the desire to write more in the future.

In November 2011, Harlech appeared in Karl Lagerfeld's film The Tale of a Fairy and the Patricia Mazuy film Sport de Filles with Marina Hands, Bruno Ganz and Josiane Balasko. In May 2013, Harlech appeared in Karl Lagerfeld's film Once Upon a Time, featuring Keira Knightley. In September 2013, Harlech is seen in the Fendi film Invito Pericoloso. In 2015, she made a brief appearance in the Karl Lagerfeld-directed Once and Forever, starring Kristen Stewart, Geraldine Chaplin, and Jérémie Elkaïm.

=== Exhibitions and curation ===
In December 2011, Harlech curated the Krug-sponsored "Happiness" exhibition at the Royal Academy of Arts, London. The exhibition, which raised funds for the Royal Academy Schools, consisted of artworks donated by celebrities.

In 2015, Harlech curated the first and only retrospective of Karl Lagerfeld's fashion career at The Art and Exhibition Hall of the Federal Republic of Germany – Bundeskunsthalle.

== Personal life ==
On 16 May 1986, she married Francis Ormsby-Gore, 6th Baron Harlech, adopting the surname 'Harlech'. The couple had two children:

- Jasset David Cody Ormsby-Gore, 7th Baron Harlech (b. 1 July 1986), studied at Central St Martins
- The Hon. Tallulah Sylvia Ormsby-Gore (b. 16 May 1988), studied at the New York Film Academy.

Harlech and her husband were divorced on 31 August 1998. She now lives in Shropshire, with a base at the Hôtel Ritz Paris for the city's fashion shows.

== Titles ==
- Miss Amanda Grieve (1958–1986)
- The Right Honourable The Lady Harlech (1986–1998)
- Amanda, Lady Harlech (1998–present)
