= Baron Harlech =

Title in the UK Peerage

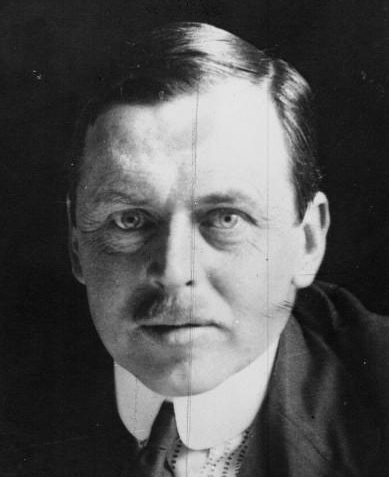
The 4th Baron Harlech.

Baron Harlech, of Harlech in the County of Merioneth, is a title in the Peerage of the United Kingdom. It was created in 1876 for the Conservative politician John Ormsby-Gore, with remainder to his younger brother William. He had previously represented Carnarvon and North Shropshire in the House of Commons. Ormsby-Gore was the eldest son of William Ormsby-Gore, Member of Parliament for County Leitrim, Carnarvon and North Shropshire, and the great-great-great-grandson of William Gore, third and youngest son of Sir Arthur Gore, 1st Baronet, of Newtown, second son of Sir Paul Gore, 1st Baronet, of Magharabag, whose eldest son Paul was the grandfather of Arthur Gore, 1st Earl of Arran.

Lord Harlech was succeeded according to the special remainder by his brother William, the second Baron. He was a former Conservative Member of Parliament for County Sligo and County Leitrim and also served as Lord Lieutenant of County Leitrim for many years. His son, the third Baron, represented Oswestry in the House of Commons as a Conservative between the May 1901 - June 1904. And he also served as Lord Lieutenant of County Leitrim and of Merionethshire. He was succeeded by his son, the fourth Baron. He was a Conservative politician and notably served as Postmaster-General, as First Commissioner of Works and as Secretary of State for the Colonies. His second but eldest surviving son, the fifth Baron, was a prominent Conservative politician and diplomat. From 1961 to 1965 he served as British Ambassador to the United States. As of 2016 the title is held by his grandson, the seventh Baron, who succeeded in 2016.

ITV Wales & West is an independent television company established by David Ormsby-Gore, 5th Baron Harlech. The company was initially known as Harlech Television (HTV), but changed name in 1970.

The family seat is Glyn Cywarch, near Talsarnau, Gwynedd, Wales. The former family seat is Brogyntyn Hall, near Oswestry, Shropshire. The 7th Baron sold off almost £2.6m in family heirlooms to fund restoration of Glyn Cywarch.

== Baron Harlech (1876) ==
- John Ralph Ormsby-Gore, 1st Baron Harlech (1816–1876)
- William Richard Ormsby-Gore, 2nd Baron Harlech (1819–1904)
  - William Seymour Ormsby-Gore (1852–1853)
- George Ralph Charles Ormsby-Gore, 3rd Baron Harlech (1855–1938)
- William George Arthur Ormsby-Gore, 4th Baron Harlech (1885–1964)
  - Owen Gerhard Cecil Ormsby-Gore (1916–1935)
- (William) David Ormsby-Gore, 5th Baron Harlech (1918–1985)
  - Hon. Julian Hugh Ormsby-Gore (1940–1974)
- Francis David Ormsby-Gore, 6th Baron Harlech (1954–2016)
- Jasset David Cody Ormsby-Gore, 7th Baron Harlech (b. 1986)

The heir apparent is the present holder's son, the Hon. Teo Francis Ormsby-Gore (b. 2024).

=== Title succession chart ===
Title succession chart, Barons Harlech.

William Ormsby-Gore; 1779–1860
Baron Harlech
John Ormsby-Gore; 1st Baron Harlech; 1816–1876	William Ormsby-Gore; 2nd Baron Harlech; 1819–1904
William Ormsby-Gore; 1852–1853	George Ormsby-Gore; 3rd Baron Harlech; 1855–1938
William Ormsby-Gore; 4th Baron Harlech; 1885–1964
Owen Ormsby-Gore; 1916–1935	David Ormsby-Gore; 5th Baron Harlech; 1918–1985
Hon. Julian Ormsby-Gore; 1940–1974	Francis Ormsby-Gore; 6th Baron Harlech; 1954–2016
Jasset Ormsby-Gore; 7th Baron Harlech born 1986
Hon. Teo Ormsby-Gore born 2024

== Coat of arms ==
Coat of arms of Baron Harlech
Notes Coat of arms of the Ormsby-Gore family Coronet A coronet of a Baron Crest 1st: an Heraldic Tiger rampant Argent; 2nd: a Dexter Arm embowed in armour proper holding in the hand a Man's Leg also in armour couped at the thigh Escutcheon Quarterly: 1st and 4th, Gules a Fess between three Cross Crosslets fitchy Or (Gore); 2nd and 3rd, Gules a Bend between six Cross Crosslets Or (Ormsby) Supporters Dexter: an Heraldic Tiger Argent maned and tufted Sable ducally gorged Or; Sinister: a Lion Or Motto In Hoc Signo Vinces (Under this sign thou shalt conquer)

== See also ==
- Gore baronets
- Earl of Arran (1762 creation)
- Harlech Castle
