= Alan Grieve =

British businessman (1928–2025)

Alan Thomas Grieve, CBE (22 January 1928 – 14 May 2025) was a British lawyer, company director and chairman of the Jerwood Foundation.

== Life and career ==
Alan Grieve was born in London, England on 22 January 1928. He was educated at Aldenham School and Trinity Hall, Cambridge. He undertook National Service and was commissioned in 1949 in the Royal Armoured Corps (14th/20th King's Hussars); he subsequently served as a Territorial Army officer in the City of London Yeomanry (Rough Riders). He joined the Gray's Inn solicitors Taylor & Humbert in 1958 after gaining commercial, city and merger and acquisition experience as an assistant solicitor at Slaughter and May. He became senior partner of Taylor & Humbert in 1980. During those 22 years the firms expanded as a commercial and private client practice and established Interlex, an international grouping of lawyers.

Grieve organised and managed the merger of Taylor & Humbert with the City firm of Parker Garrett and the merged firm was renamed Taylor Garrett where Grieve remained the Senior Partner until 1989 when Taylor Garrett merged with Joynson Hicks to become Taylor Joynson Garrett. Grieve remained a consultant to the enlarged firm which is now Taylor Wessing.

He established the Jerwood Foundation for his client, John Jerwood, in 1977 and ran it as chairman after Jerwood's death in 1991, responsible for the distribution of some £109 million in funding for the arts in Britain, as well as for accumulating the foundation's art collection, Jerwood Collection of Modern and Contemporary British art, formerly on display at the Jerwood Gallery at Hastings. He was appointed a Commander of the Order of the British Empire (CBE) for services to the arts in the 2003 Birthday Honours, and was an Honorary Fellow of both the Royal College of Physicians (RCP) and Trinity College of Music, London (TCML).

Grieve married Karen Dunn in 1971 and had five children; his eldest daughter is Amanda Harlech, Charlie Grieve is CEO of Brandcast Media and publisher at Magdalen Medical Publishing, Lara Wardle is executive director of the Jerwood Foundation, Tom Grieve is the architect responsible for the Jerwood Gallery and Ivan Grieve is an artist.

Grieve died on 14 May 2025, at the age of 97.
