= Faber (surname) =

Faber is the Latin word for "smith". Like a few other Latin occupational names (e.g. Agricola for farmer, Nauta for sailor), it was adopted as a surname in the Low Countries and Germany. It is also common in England, perhaps due to Norman French influence. Notable people with the surname include:

- Adele Faber (1928–2024), American author on parenting
- Andreas Faber-Kaiser (1944–1994), Spanish writer of German descent
- Antonius Faber (1557–1624), Savoisian nobleman and jurist
- Armin Faber (c. 1916 – c. 2000), German World War II pilot
- Aschwin Wildeboer Faber (born 1986), Spanish swimmer of Dutch origin
- Ate Faber (1894–1962), Dutch fencer
- Basil Faber (1520–1576), Lutheran theologian
- Brock Faber (born 2002), American ice hockey player
- Carla Faber (born 1971), Dutch art historian and politician
- Caroline Faber (1923–2016), English peer, daughter of PM Harold Macmillan
- Christian Wilhelm von Faber du Faur (1780–1857), Württemberg painter and army officer
- Claire Faber (born 1998), Luxembourgish racing cyclist
- Dave Faber (born 1975), Canadian singer and guitarist of Faber Drive
- David Faber (1928–2015), Polish Holocaust survivor
- David A. Faber (born 1942), American judge
- David Faber (born 1950), American printer
- David Faber (born 1961), British schoolmaster and politician
- David Faber (born 1964), American market news analyst
- Denison Faber, 1st Baron Wittenham (1852–1931), British peer
- Donna Faber (born 1971), American tennis player
- Edmund Faber, 1st Baron Faber (1847–1920), British politician
- Eli Faber (1943–2020), American historian
- Elmar Faber (1934–2017), German book publisher
- Emmanuel Faber (born 1964), French CEO
- Erik Faber (born 1977), Norwegian pop/rock singer-songwriter
- Ernest Faber (born 1971), Dutch footballer
- Erwin Faber (1891–1989), Austrian actor
- Eugeniusz Faber (1939–2021), Polish footballer
- Felix Faber (1441–1502), Swiss/German Dominican theologian
- Floreta Faber (born 1968), Albanian diplomat
- François Faber (1887–1915), Luxembourgish cyclist
- Frands Faber (1897–1933), Danish field hockey player
- Frédéric Théodore Faber (1782–1844), Belgian landscape and genre painter
- Frederick William Faber (1814–1863), British hymn writer and theologian
- Frederik Faber (1796–1828), Danish ornithologist
- Gastón Faber (born 1996), Uruguayan footballer
- Geke Faber (born 1952), Dutch politician
- Geoffrey Faber (1889–1961), British academic, publisher and poet, founder of Faber and Faber Limited
- Georg Faber (1877–1966), German mathematician
- George Henry Faber (1839–1910), British insurance underwriter and Liberal Party politician
- George S. J. Faber (born 1959), co-founder of British production company Company Pictures
- George Stanley Faber (1773–1854), Anglican theologian
- Giovanni Faber né Johann Faber (1574–1629), German papal doctor, botanist, and member of the Accademia dei Lincei
- Gordon Faber (1930–2014), American politician, in Oregon
- Heike Faber (born 1965), German actress
- Heinrich Faber (before 1500–1552), German music theorist, composer, and Kantor
- Horst Faber (1921–2022), German figure skater
- Jack Faber (1903–1994), American microbiologist and lacrosse coach
- Jacob Faber (fl. 1516 – c. 1550), French artist and publisher (active in Switzerland), easily confused with:
- Jacob Faber Stapulensis (c. 1455 – c. 1536), French Renaissance humanist and theologian
- Jacob Faber of Deventer (1473 – c. 1517), Dutch Renaissance humanist
- Jared Faber, American musician, composer and producer
- Jean-Paul Faber (1930–2018), French sports shooter
- Jeannette Faber (born 1982), American long-distance runner
- Jelle Faber (1924–2004), Dutch-Canadian theologian
- Joachim Faber (born 1950), German lawyer and business executive
- Johan Adam Faber (1692–1759), Flemish composer
- Johann Faber (1478–1541), German Catholic theologian
- Johann Faber of Heilbronn (1504–1558), German Catholic preacher
- Johann Augustanus Faber (1470–1531), Swiss theologian
- Johann Joachim Faber (1778–1846) German landscape painter
- John Faber the Elder (c. 1660 – 1721), Dutch portrait engraver active in London
- John Faber the Younger (1684–1756), Dutch portrait painter active in London
- John Faber, Kansas politician
- John Eberhard Faber (1822–1879), German-born American pencil manufacturer
- Jules Faber, Australian cartoonist and illustrator
- Julian Faber (1917–2002), British insurance businessman
- Karl Faber (1773–1853), German historian
- Kaspar Faber (1730–1784), German founder of the stationery company Faber-Castell
- Katherine Faber, American researcher
- Keith Faber (born 1966), American (Ohio) politician
- Klaas Carel Faber (1922–2012), Dutch collaborator with the Nazis
- Leslie Faber (1879–1929), English stage actor
- Linda Faber (born 1960), Dutch freestyle swimmer
- Lo Faber (born 1966), American guitarist and songwriter
- Lothar von Faber (1817–1896), German industrialist, born Lothar Faber
- Lucien Faber (born 1952), Luxembourgish racewalker
- Lykele Faber (1919–2009), Dutch commando and radio operator during World War II
- Marc Faber (born 1946), Swiss economist and investor
- Marcus Faber (born 1984), German politician
- Marjolein Faber (born 1960), Dutch politician
- Mark Faber (1950–1991), English cricketer
- Martin Hermann Faber (1586–1648), German painter, architect, and cartographer
- Mary Faber (1798–1857), African slave trader
- Mary Faber (born 1979), American singer, actress, and dancer
- Mary Eliza Faber (1850–1936), English novelist and non-fiction writer
- Matthew Faber, (1973–2020), American television actor
- Matthias Faber (1587–1653), German Jesuist priest
- Michael Faber (1929–2015), British economist
- Michael Faber (born 1995), German footballer
- Michel Faber (born 1960), Dutch novelist
- Oscar Faber (1886–1956), British structural engineer
- Olaf Wildeboer Faber (born 1983), Spanish swimmer of Dutch origin
- Pamela Faber (born 1950), American/Spanish linguist
- Patrick Faber (born 1964), Dutch field hockey player
- Patrick Faber (born 1978), Belizean politician
- St. Peter Faber (1506–1546), co-founder of the Society of Jesus
- Peter Faber (1810–1877), Danish songwriter, photographer and telegraphy expert
- Peter Faber (1943–2026), Dutch film and television actor
- Philip Faber (1564–1630), Italian Franciscan theologian and philosopher
- Phyllis M. Faber (born 1927), American botanist
- Pierre Faber (born 1978), German rugby player
- Rasmus Faber (born 1979), Swedish DJ, pianist and music producer
- Red Faber (1888–1976), American baseball pitcher
- Roland Faber (born 1960), American theologian
- Samantha "Sam" Faber (born 1987), American ice hockey player
- Sandra Faber (born 1944), American astronomer
- Simon Faber (born 1968), German politician and mayor
- Steve Faber, American screenwriter
- Tanaquil Faber (1615–1672), French classical scholar
- Tobias Faber (1915–2010), Danish architect
- Tom Faber (1927–2004), British physicist and publisher
- Toos Faber-de Heer (1929–2020), Dutch TV presenter and civil servant
- Urijah Faber (born 1979), American mixed martial arts fighter
- Vance Faber (born 1944), American mathematician
- Walter Vavasour Faber (1857–1928), English Conservative politician and soldier
- Wenzel Faber (1455–1518), Bohemian astronomer, astrologer and theologian
- William F. Faber (bishop) (1860–1934), American Episcopalian bishop
- William F. Faber (politician) (1858–1951), American politician

Fictional characters:

- Faber, a former professor in Fahrenheit 451
- Emil Faber, Founder of Faber College in the film Animal House
- Henry Faber, German spy in the Ken Follett novel Eye of the Needle
- Jacky Faber, female protagonist in the novel Bloody Jack and its sequels
- Mike Faber, character in Homeland (TV series)
- Daniel Aurifaber (Goldsmith), character in The Sanctuary Sparrow, a Cadfael novel by Ellis Peters
