= John Faber =

John Faber may refer to:

- Jack Faber (1903–1994), professor, lacrosse coach, and football coach at the University of Maryland
- Johann Faber (1478–1541), German theologian
- Giovanni Faber (1574–1629), German papal doctor, botanist and art collector sometimes called Johann Faber
- John Faber the Elder (c. 1660–1721), Dutch portrait miniaturist and engraver active in London
- John Faber the Younger (c. 1695–1756), Dutch portrait engraver active in London, son of the former
- John Faber (Kansas politician), member of the Kansas House of Representatives
- John Eberhard Faber (1822–1879), German-born American manufacturer of pencils
