= Johann Casimir Benicken =

German jurist and judge (1782–1838)

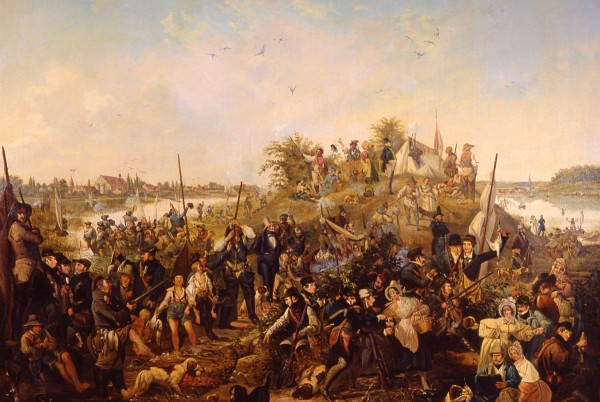
An 1836 oil painting by Friedrich Bernhard Westphal (1803-1844) titled Der Möwenpreis [the seagull prize] in the Schleswig museum shows a seagull bounty hunt on Seagull Island in Schlei. Towards the right, in front of a post with white cloth tied to it are the musician Friedrich Adolph Mackrott holding a black-headed gull held raised in his left hand and to his right stands the city secretary, Benicken, wearing a bowler hat

Johann Casimir Benicken (1 August 1782 – 1 December 1838) was a jurist and judge from the Duchy of Schleswig who also took an interest in the birds and natural history of the region. He was also a city secretary (or town clerk) for the city of Schleswig, Duchy of Schleswig.

== Life and work ==
Benicken was born in the Duchy of Schleswig, son of high court councillor Johann Hinrich Oswald (1746–1787) and Helene Christina née Clausen (a great aunt of the poet Thedor Storm). He was educated at the Cathedral School in Schleswig and then at the Christian-Albrechts-Universität at Kiel from 1799. He continued studies at the University of Göttingen and passed the legal exam in 1803 at Gottorf. He became a lower court lawyer in Schleswig and from 1808 to 1837 he was city secretary. In 1825 he became judge for the estates of Buckhagen, Roest, Karlsburg and Windeby.

Benicken took an interest in birds and published on the gulls in 1812. He became a specialist on the gulls and documented the breeding of several species of gulls in the Schleswig region. He recorded Sandwich terns (Thalasseus sandvicensis), Arctic terns (Sterna paradisaea) and little terns (Sternula albifrons) apart from glaucous gulls (Larus hyperboreus), and little gulls (Larus minutus). He collected specimens and corresponded with Frederik Faber, J.F. Mecklenburg, Friedrich Boie, Heinrich Boie, Johann Philipp Achilles Leisler and Christian Ludwig Brehm. His friends included Bernhard Christian Schleep and they received collections from Greenland and Iceland including a specimen of the great auk from Disko Island (the specimen is now in Copenhagen). His collection was partly donated to the University of Kiel and some were bought by Emil Hage. Brehm gave the name Lestris benickii for a skua in 1824 but this was based on an immature bird and is a junior synonym of Stercorarius longicaudus.

Benicken was married twice, first to Friedericke Henriette Meckelburg and then to Elsabe Eleonore née Müller with a daughter from his second marriage.
