= David Faber =

David Faber may refer to:

- David Faber (printmaker) (born 1950), American printmaker
- David Faber (politician) (born 1961), English schoolmaster, formerly a Conservative politician
- David Faber (journalist) (born 1964), host on CNBC's Squawk on the Street
- David Faber (author) (1926–2015), Holocaust survivor and author of Because of Romek
- David A. Faber (born 1942), U.S. district judge
