= Gilbert Knowles =

English Roman Catholic priest, botanist and poet (1667–1734)

Gilbert Knowles (1667–1734) was an English Roman Catholic priest, botanist and poet.

He is known only for his Materia Medica Botanica (London, 1723, 4to), which was dedicated to Dr. Richard Mead, and consists of 7355 Latin hexameters. Four hundred plants of the materia medica are described and their uses in medicine explained. Various episodes, some of which may yet be read with pleasure, are interwoven with the subject for the sake of ornament. Knowles alludes to his verses as being written "rudi Minerva", and evidently was a close student both of Virgil's style and matter.

A portrait engraved in mezzotint by John Faber the Younger from a painting by T. Murray, subscribed "Mr. Gilbert Knowles, ætatis 49, anno 1723," is prefixed to the volume.
