= Michael Faber =

Michael Faber may refer to:

- Michael Faber (economist) (1929–2015), British economist
- Michael Faber (footballer, born 1939) (1939–1993), East German footballer
- Michael Faber (footballer, born 1995), German footballer

== See also ==
- Mike Faber (disambiguation)
- Michel Faber, Dutch author
