= Practica (astrology) =

Type of almanac

A practica was an annually printed booklet containing astrological predictions for that year. They were a popular genre of printed work in German-speaking territories from the 15th to the 17th century. Wenzel Faber von Budweis and Johannes Virdung were two leading authors in the genre.
