= Mike Faber =

Mike Faber may refer to:

- Mike Faber (In Plain Sight), a character from the TV series In Plain Sight
- Mike Faber (Homeland), a character from the TV series Homeland

== See also ==
- Michael Faber (disambiguation)
