= Bernhard Christian Schleep =

Bernhard Christian Schleep (4 April 1768 – 27 May 1838) was a land-owning forester and Councillor in Schleswig-Holstein, a naturalist and collector of natural history specimens.

Schleep was a son of Johannes Schleep and Maria Christina née Stritter. He became a councilor in the Landgrave Karl von Hessen-Kassel court, Gottorf Castle. Along with his friend Johann Casimir Benicken, he became a collector of natural history specimens including numerous birds, fish, and mammals. Schleep collaborated with other naturalists, including Johann Friedrich Naumann, Christian Ludwig Brehm, Bernhard Meyer, and Johann Philipp Achilles Leisler. He had been gifted specimens of polar bears and narwhals by Greenland whalers. A collection of nearly 600 birds was bequeathed to Landgrave Karl, which was later obtained by Frederick VI, who donated it to the University of Kiel in 1937. The specimens are now lost, but his books are still in the university's library. C. L. Brehm named "Schleep's rapacious gull," Lestris schleepii, in 1824, a synonym of the Arctic skua. Schleep described a form (now subspecies) of the glaucous gull L. h. leuceretes in 1819.
