= Wenzel Faber =

Bohemian astrologer

Wenzel Faber von Budweis (1455–1518) was an astronomer, astrologer and theologian from Bohemia.

He was the leading author of practicas in the late 15th century, making him one of the most widely printed authors of his time.
