= Ate Faber =

Dutch fencer (1894–1962)

Personal information
- Born: 19 March 1894 Leeuwarden, Netherlands
- Died: 19 March 1962 (aged 68) Zutphen, Netherlands

Sport
- Sport: Fencing

Ate Faber (19 March 1894 – 19 March 1962) was a Dutch fencer. He competed in the team sabre event at the 1936 Summer Olympics.
