= Johann Augustanus Faber =

Swiss theologian

John Augustanus Faber
- Born: c. 1470; Fribourg, Switzerland
- Died: 1531
- Education: Doctor of Divinity
- Occupations: Theologian, Dominican priest
- Known for: Vicar General of the Dominican Congregation of Upper Germany
- Notable work: Consilium cuiusdam ex animo cupientis esse consultum et R. pontificis dignitati et christianae religionis tranquillitati (1521)
- Title: Prior of the Augsburg Convent

John Augustanus Faber (c. 1470 – 1531) was a Swiss theologian, born in Fribourg.

He entered the Dominican Order, probably at Augsburg, Germany, where he passed the greater part of his religious life, hence his name Augustanus. He obtained the degrees of Master and Doctor of Divinity, and in 1511 was made Vicar General of the Dominican Congregation of Upper Germany, and for twenty years filled the office of prior in the Augsburg Convent. By 1516 he was teaching in Bologna.

From 1512 to 1515 he rebuilt the Dominican church in that city, for which some of the funds were obtained through the preaching of a jubilee permitted by Pope Leo X and also, after a prohibition, by the Emperor Maximilian I. Maximilian made him court preacher and royal counselor. On the recommendation of Erasmus, with whom he was very friendly, he was again appointed to these offices by Maximilian's successor, King Charles V. Sympathizing with the Lutherans in their revival of classical learning, he advocated a plan for the treatment of Martin Luther and his followers that the ecclesiastical superiors could not accept. When he withdrew this, and broke away from the humanists, he received the abuse of Luther, and also of his former supporter Erasmus, who had already been provoked by his censure, published anonymously, for adhering to the new errors. The accusation made by Erasmus, that Faber had calumniated him to Thomas Cajetan has not been proved.

In 1521, he wrote anonymously the Consilium cuiusdam ex animo cupientis esse consultum et R. pontificis dignitati et christianae religionis tranquillitati; this was written anonymously.
