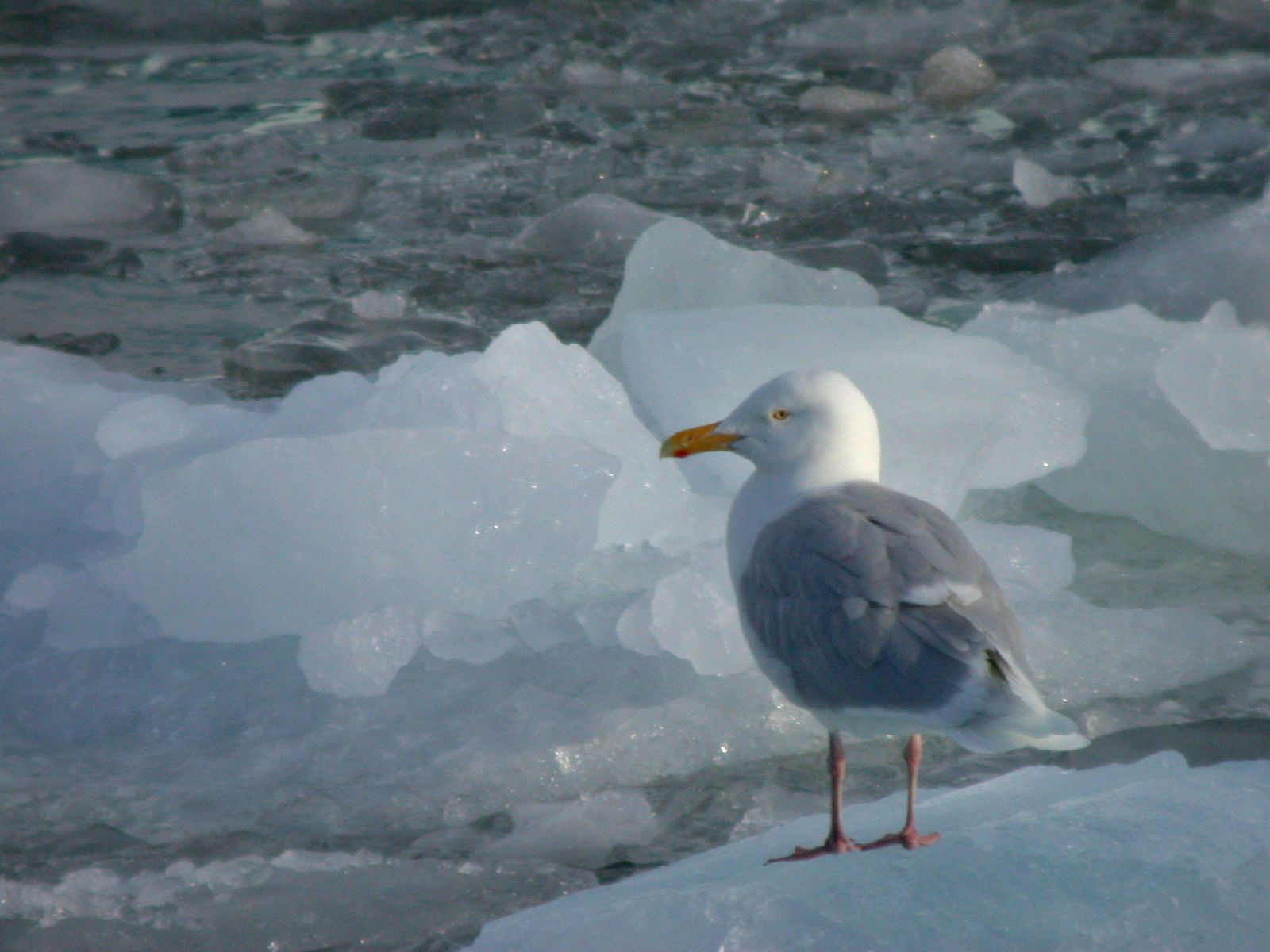

Conservation status
- Least Concern (IUCN 3.1)

Scientific classification
- Kingdom: Animalia
- Phylum: Chordata
- Class: Aves
- Order: Charadriiformes
- Family: Laridae
- Genus: Larus
- Species: L. hyperboreus

Binomial name
- Larus hyperboreus Gunnerus, 1767

= Glaucous gull =

Species of bird

The glaucous gull (Larus hyperboreus) is a large gull, the second-largest gull in the world. The genus name is from Latin larus, which appears to have referred to a gull or other large seabird. The specific name hyperboreus is Latin for "northern" from the Ancient Greek Huperboreoi people from the far north "Glaucous" is from Latin glaucus and denotes the grey colour of the gull. An older English name for this species is burgomaster.

== Distribution ==
This gull breeds in Arctic regions of the Northern Hemisphere and winters south to shores of the Holarctic. It is migratory, wintering from in the North Atlantic and North Pacific Oceans as far south as the British Isles and northernmost states of the United States, also on the Great Lakes. A few birds sometimes reach the southern USA and northern Mexico.

== Description ==
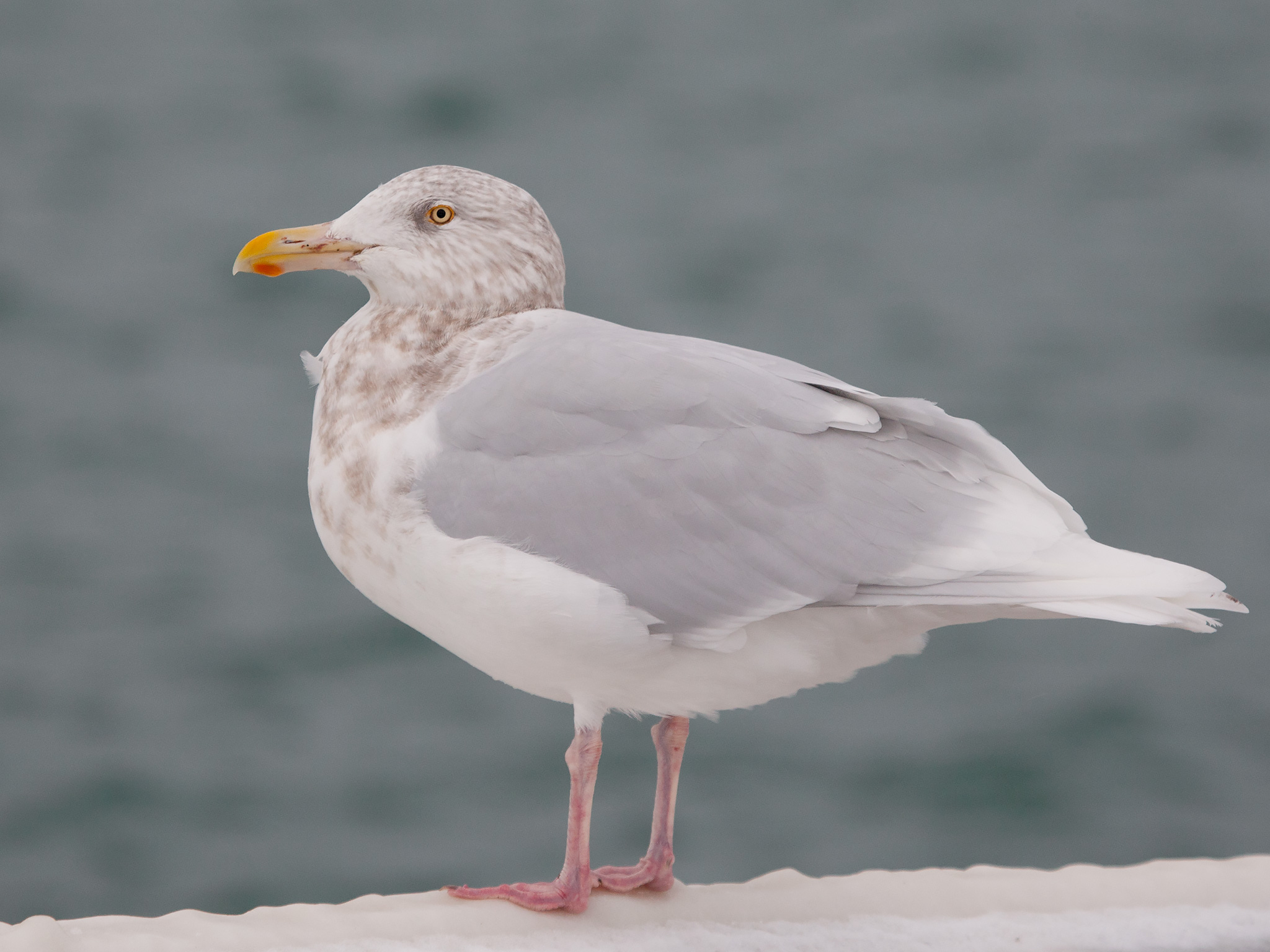
Adult plumage

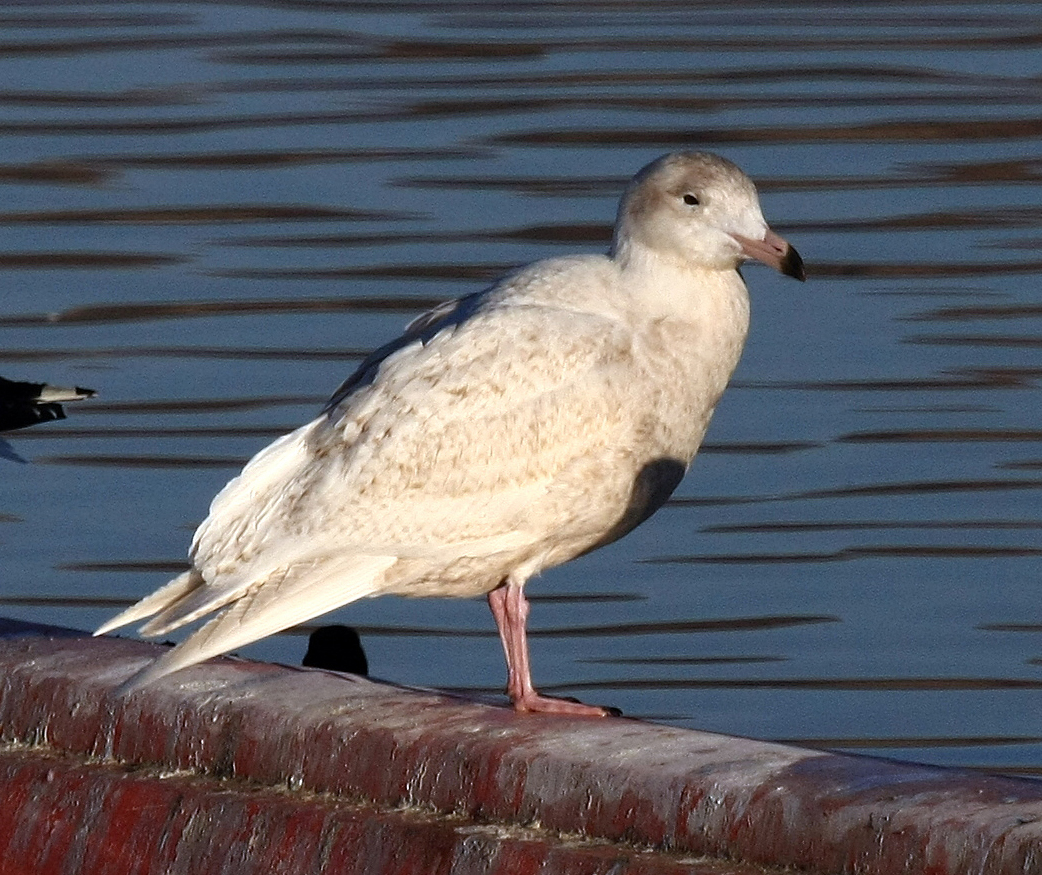
Immature plumage

This is a large and powerful gull, second-largest of all gull species and very pale in all plumage, with no black on either the wings or the tail. Adults are pale grey above, with a thick, yellow bill. Juveniles are very pale grey with a pink and black bill. This species is considerably larger, bulkier, and thicker-billed than the similar Iceland gull, and can sometimes equal the size of the great black-backed gull, the oft-titled largest gull species. In some areas, glaucous gulls are about the same weight as great black-backed gulls or even heavier, and their maximum weight is greater. They can weigh from 960 to 2,700 g (2.12 to 5.95 lb), with the sexes previously reported to average 1.55 kg (3.4 lb) in males and 1.35 kg (3.0 lb) in females. At the colony on Coats Island in Canada, the gulls are nearly 15% heavier than some other known populations, with a mean weight 1.86 kg (4.1 lb) in five males and 1.49 kg (3.3 lb) in seven females. One other study claimed even higher weights for glaucous gulls, as on Wrangel Island, 9 males reportedly averaged 2.32 kg (5.1 lb) and 2.1 kg (4.6 lb) in six females, which if accurate, would make the glaucous gull the heaviest gull and shorebird in the world if not (as far as is known) the largest in length on average. These gulls range from 55 to 77 cm (22 to 30 in) in length and can span 132 to 170 cm (52 to 67 in), with some specimens possibly attaining 182 cm (72 in), across the wings. Among standard measurements, the wing chord is 40.8 to 50.1 cm (16.1 to 19.7 in), the bill is 4.9 to 6.9 cm (1.9 to 2.7 in) and the tarsus is 6 to 7.7 cm (2.4 to 3.0 in). They take four years to reach maturity.

The call is a "laughing" cry similar to that of the herring gull, but deeper.

== Subspecies ==
The four recognized subspecies are:

Image	Subspecies	Distribution
	L. h. hyperboreus, Gunnerus, 1767	nominate, found from northern Europe to north-western Siberia
	L. h. pallidissimus, Portenko, 1939	found from north-western Siberia to the Bering Sea - the largest subspecies, paler than hyperboreus with bright raspberry pink legs (possibly due to diet).
	L. h. barrovianus, Ridgway, 1886	found from Alaska to north-west Canada - the smallest subspecies, with a darker mantle, shorter bill and longer wings than hyperboreus. First-year immature is generally darker and more strongly-marked than hyperboreus.
	L. h. leuceretes, Schleep, 1819	found from north-central Canada to Greenland and Iceland - Averages slightly paler than hyperboreus. Olsen & Larsson (2003) in Gulls of Europe, Asia and North America consider it synonymous with nominate hyperboreus.

== Ecology ==
This species of seagull breeds colonially or singly on coasts and cliffs, making a lined nest on the ground or cliff. Normally, two to four light brown eggs with dark brown splotches are laid.

These are omnivores like most Larus gulls, and they eat fish, insects, molluscs, starfish, offal, scraps, eggs, small birds, small mammals, and carrion, as well as seeds, berries, and grains.

Glaucous gull at De Cocksdorp, Netherlands

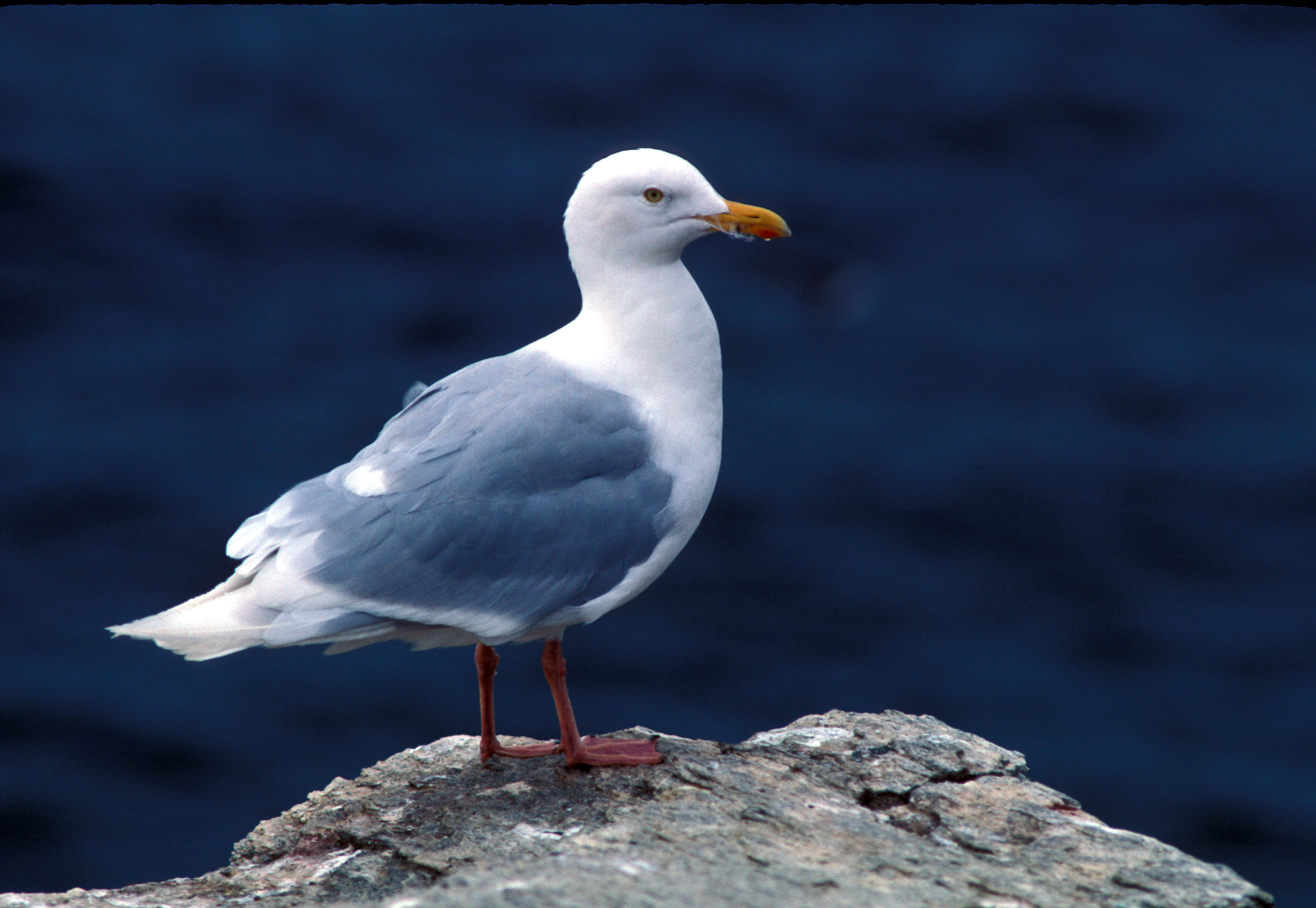

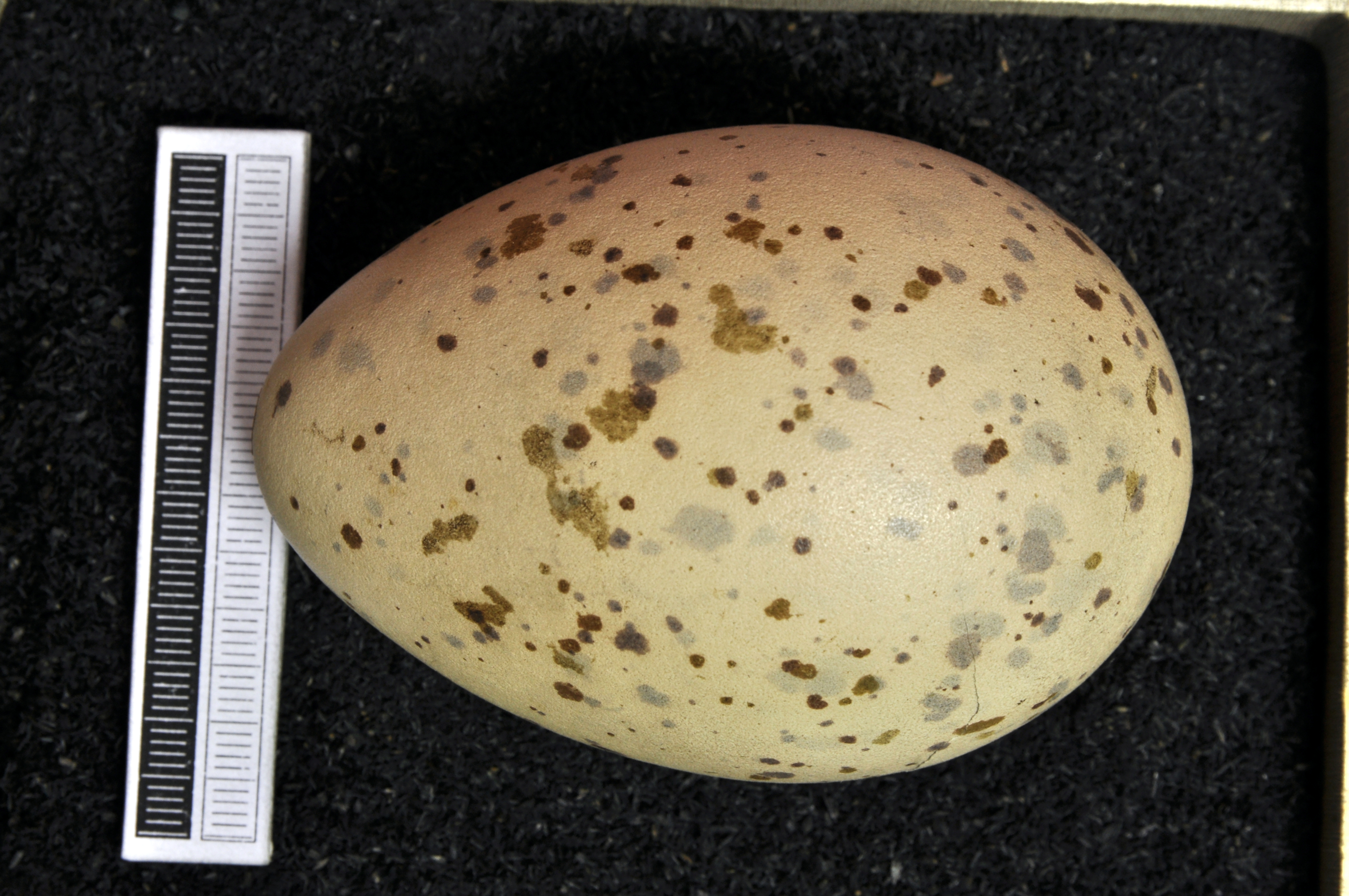
Egg, collection Museum Wiesbaden

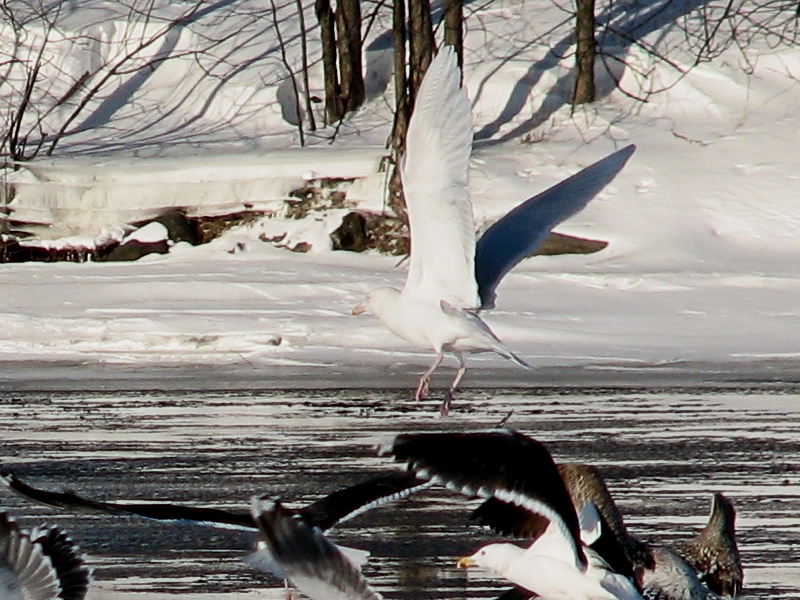
In flight with great black-backed gulls, Ottawa, Ontario
