= Nauta (disambiguation) =

Nauta is an urban center in the Peruvian Amazon.

Nauta may refer to:

- The Latin word for sailor
- Nauta District, Loreto, Peru

== Surname ==
- Dieuwke de Graaff-Nauta (1930–2008), Dutch politician
- Isaac Nauta (born 1997), American football player
- Kate Nauta (born 1982), American model and actress
- Lodi Nauta (born 1966), Dutch historian and winner of the 2016 Spinoza Prize
- Max Nauta (1896–1957), Dutch painter
- Sarah Nauta (born 1998), Dutch singer and voice actress
- Walle Nauta (1916–1994), Dutch and American neuroanatomist
- Walt Nauta (born 1982/83), American political aide
- Yvonne Nauta (born 1991), Dutch speed skater

== See also ==
- Nautan, Bihar, India
- Nauta, brand name of Cuba's public internet service, operated by ETECSA
