= Johan Adam Faber =

Joannes Adamus Josephus Faber (1692-Antwerp, 1759) was a composer who spent most of his working life associated with Antwerp Cathedral. Faber was possibly originally from Mainz. Only two of his polyphonic masses survive in manuscript; a Missa Et resurrexit in the cathedral archive and a Missa Maria assumpta in the Antwerp conservatory.

== Recordings ==
- Johan Adam Faber - Missa Maria Assumpta Benoit Laurent, Terra Nova Collective, Vlad Weverbergh Etcetera, CD, 2016
