= Tom Faber =

English physicist

- Born: April 25, 1927; London, United Kingdom
- Died: July 27, 2004 (aged 77)

Thomas Erle Faber (25 April 1927 – 27 July 2004) was an English physicist and publisher, and he was a university lecturer at the University of Cambridge for 35 years.

== Early life and education ==
Thomas Faber was born in London in 1927, the son of Sir Geoffrey Faber, a don at All Souls College, Oxford, and also the co-founder of the publishing house that later became Faber and Faber. His maternal grandfather, Sir Erle Richards, was the former Chichele Professor of Public International Law, Oxford. Tom studied at the Dragon School, Oxford and Oundle. He won a scholarship to Trinity College, Cambridge in 1945, where he studied Natural Sciences with a specialty in physics. He moved to Corpus Christi College in 1953, where he became a Fellow, a position he held for the rest of his life.

== Career ==
He was a lecturer in physics at the University of Cambridge from 1959 until 1993. He was a Life Fellow, Praelector Rhetoricus from 1956 until 1962, and the Treasurer from 1963 until 1975 at Corpus Christi College.

== Research ==
Faber's academic research focused on three areas; superconductivity, liquid metals and liquid crystals. He worked together with John Ziman to develop a theory of liquid metals.

== Personal life ==
Faber had two sons and two daughters from his first wife, Penelope Morton, who died in 1983; and one son and one daughter with his second wife Elisabeth van Houts, whom he married in 1986.
