= Toos Faber-de Heer =

Dutch television presenter and presenter (1929–2020)

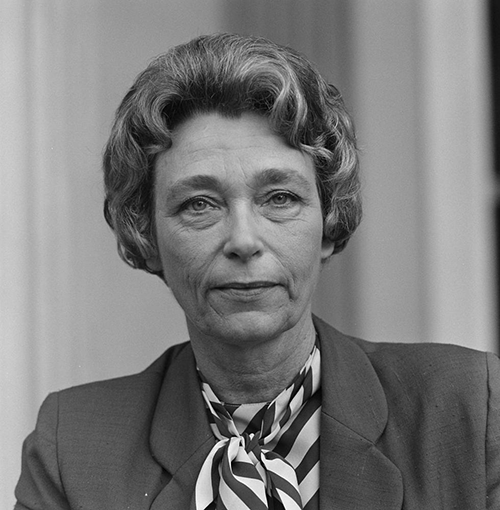
Faber-de Heer in 1981

Toos Faber-de Heer (23 February 1929 – 6 August 2020) was a Dutch journalist and justice information officer.

Faber was born in Batavia (Dutch East Indies). In 1975 she became known as the spokeswoman of Minister of Justice Dries van Agt during the 1975 Dutch train hostage crisis by South Moluccan youth in Wijster on 2 December 1975. Eighteen months later, after the 1977 Dutch train hijacking on 23 May 1977 Faber was involved as a spokesperson.

At the end of 1977 it seemed that Faber would be appointed secretary of state in the First Van Agt cabinet at the Ministry of Defense, but that did not happen. Around September 1981 the NOS started the television series Het Capitool, where she became one of the presenters together with Joop van Tijn and Herman Wigbold. She stopped after a few months. She died in The Hague, aged 91.
