= David Faber (printmaker) =

- Born: 1950 (age 75–76)
- Known for: Printmaking
- Notable work: Aberdeen Headlands, Holstein Poetry-Cantenary Curve, Three Dances of the Poet

David L. Faber (born 1950) is an American master printer, and is Professor of Art and Head of Printmaking at Wake Forest University.

Some of his most notable works include: Aberdeen Headlands, a monotype print, Holstein Poetry-Cantenary Curve, an intaglio print, Three Dances of the Poet, an intaglio print, Prairie Pedigree, an intaglio print, Saint Anna of Silos and Air, a lithograph, and The Red Holstein Factor, an intaglio plaster cast monoprint. The afore mentioned works are members of his long-lived series: Aberdeen Fence, Holstein Pedigrees, Prairie Music Series, and Piano Sheaves.

Faber's practiced printing techniques include intaglio, lithography, and monotype printing, as well as drypoint, etching and engraving techniques. His prints are held in the permanent collections of The Corcoran Gallery of Art, The National Gallery of Art, The Metropolitan Museum of Art, The San Francisco Museum of Modern Art, The National Art Museum of Ukraine in Kiev, the U. S. State Department, and the American Bar Association.

== Works ==
- A Guide to Drawing. David L. Faber, 2003(6th); 2007(7th); 2011(8th) editions ISBN 978-1-111-34272-2

== External reference ==
- Mendelowitz, Faber, Wakeham. A Guide to Drawing: Seventh Edition. Thompson/Wadsworth, United States, 2007. pages 154, 351, 365.
