= Michael Faber (economist) =

Michael Leslie Ogilvy Faber (12 August 1929 – 26 February 2015) was a professor at the University of Sussex and a key adviser to the Zambian government for whom he negotiated favourable terms for the transfer of mineral rights formerly held by the British South Africa Company.
