= John Faber the Elder =

Dutch miniaturist and engraver (1660–1721)

Johan Faber, anglicized as John Faber (c. 1660–1721), commonly referred to as John Faber the Elder, (Note: Also known as John Faber Sr and John Faber I.) was a Dutch miniaturist and portrait engraver active in London, where he set up a shop for producing and marketing his own work. His son John Faber the Younger was also active in this field.

== Life ==
Born in The Hague, Dutch Republic, Faber initially worked in Amsterdam as a miniaturist. He moved to England in the late 1690s. In 1707 Faber was settled in The Strand, near the Savoy Hospital, where he kept a print-shop, and practised as a mezzotint engraver. He died at Bristol in May 1721.

== Works ==
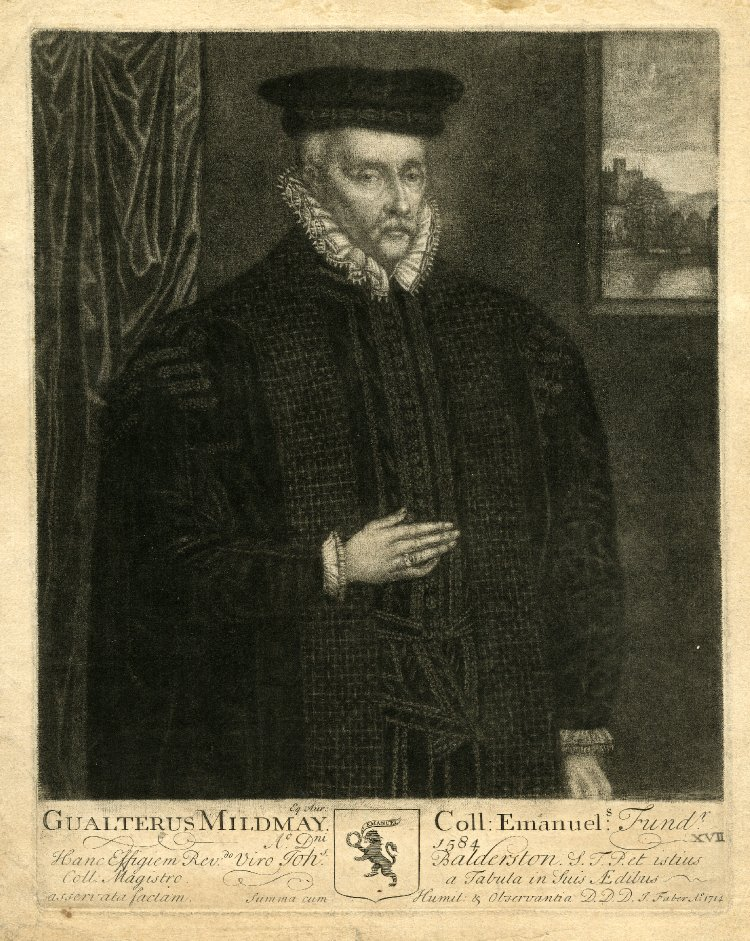
Mezzotint portrait of Sir Walter Mildmay, founder of Emmanuel College, Cambridge, by John Faber the Elder.

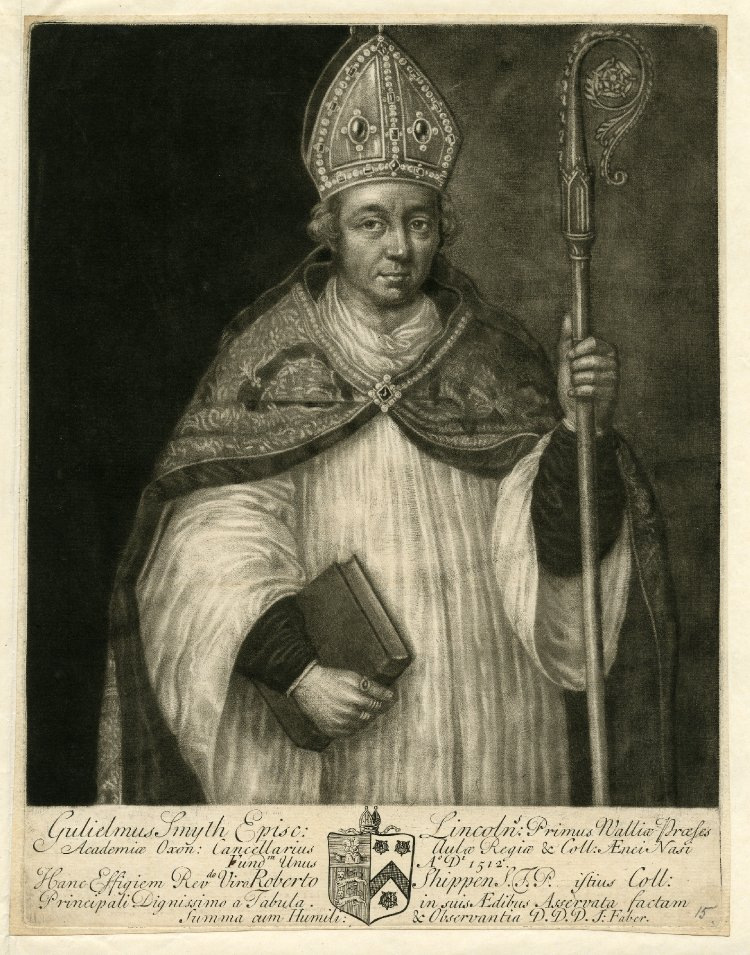
Mezzotint portrait of William Smyth, Bishop of Lincoln, and founder of Brasenose College, Oxford, by John Faber Senior.

Faber was noted for the small portraits which he drew from the life on vellum with a pen, one being of Simon Episcopius. He engraved many portraits from the life, among them being those of Francis Atterbury, Hans Caspar von Bothmer, John Hough, and Henry Sacheverell, besides numerous portraits of dissenting clergy. In 1712 he was employed at Oxford to engrave a set of the portraits of the founders of the colleges; this was followed by a similar set of portraits at Cambridge, making forty-five in all. To his visit to Oxford were due also the engraved portraits of Samuel Butler, Charles I, Geoffrey Chaucer, Duns Scotus, John Hevelius, Ben Jonson, and others.

He also engraved sets of portraits, such as 12 Ancient Philosophers, after Rubens, The Four Indian Kings (1710), and The 21 Reformers.
