= John Faber (Kansas politician) =

American politician

Member of the Kansas House of Representatives from the 120th district
- In office January 13, 1997 – January 10, 2011
- Preceded by: Fred Gatlin
- Succeeded by: Ward Cassidy

Personal details
- Born: October 22, 1952 (age 73) Colby, Kansas, U.S.
- Party: Republican
- Spouse: Renee

John Faber (October 22, 1952) is a former member of the Kansas House of Representatives, who represented the 120th district. He served from 1997 to 2011. The Kansas Chapter of Americans for Prosperity gave him an evaluation of 90 on fiscally conservative issues.

Faber has been involved with a number of community organizations, including the Brewster Co Op Board, Compassionate Friends, Goodland Co Op Board, and Lutheran Parish of Western Kansas.

== Committee membership ==
- Appropriations
- Agriculture and Natural Resources Budget (Chair)
- Transportation and Public Safety Budget
- Joint Committee on Administrative Rules and Regulations

== Major donors ==
The top 5 donors to Faber's 2008 campaign:

- 1. Kansas Medical Society $750
- 2. Kansas Assoc of Insurance Agents $600
- 3. National Rifle Association of America $500
- 4. Kansas Chamber of Commerce & Industry $500
- 5. Koch Industries $500
