= Frederik Faber =

Danish ornithologist (1796–1828)

Frederik Faber (21 April 1796 – 9 March 1828) was a pioneer Danish ornithologist who is best known for his work on the birds of Iceland, Ueber das Leben der hochnordischen Vögel, published in German in 1825.

Faber was born at Henneberg Farm near Fredericia along with eight other siblings. His father was a lawyer who moved to Copenhagen and became a brewer. Faber went to the Metropolitan School and then studied law at the university from 1813 to 1818. He then went on a visit to Iceland and returning in 1821 he became regimental quartermaster in the Sleswig Cavalry Regiment at Horsens working there until his death. Faber studied birds and animals as an amateur, travelling in the northern parts of Iceland and Jutland. His single book was Ueber das Leben der hochnordischen Vögel (1825). Faber noted that bird migration involved movements towards the poles to their breeding grounds. He also noted that young birds stayed on longer than the adult birds. Towards the end of his life he travelled to northern Jutland with his main interest in fishes. He kept notes on all his travels which are now in the Danish zoological museum. He married in 1825 and had two children.
