= John Faber the Younger =

Dutch portrait engraver

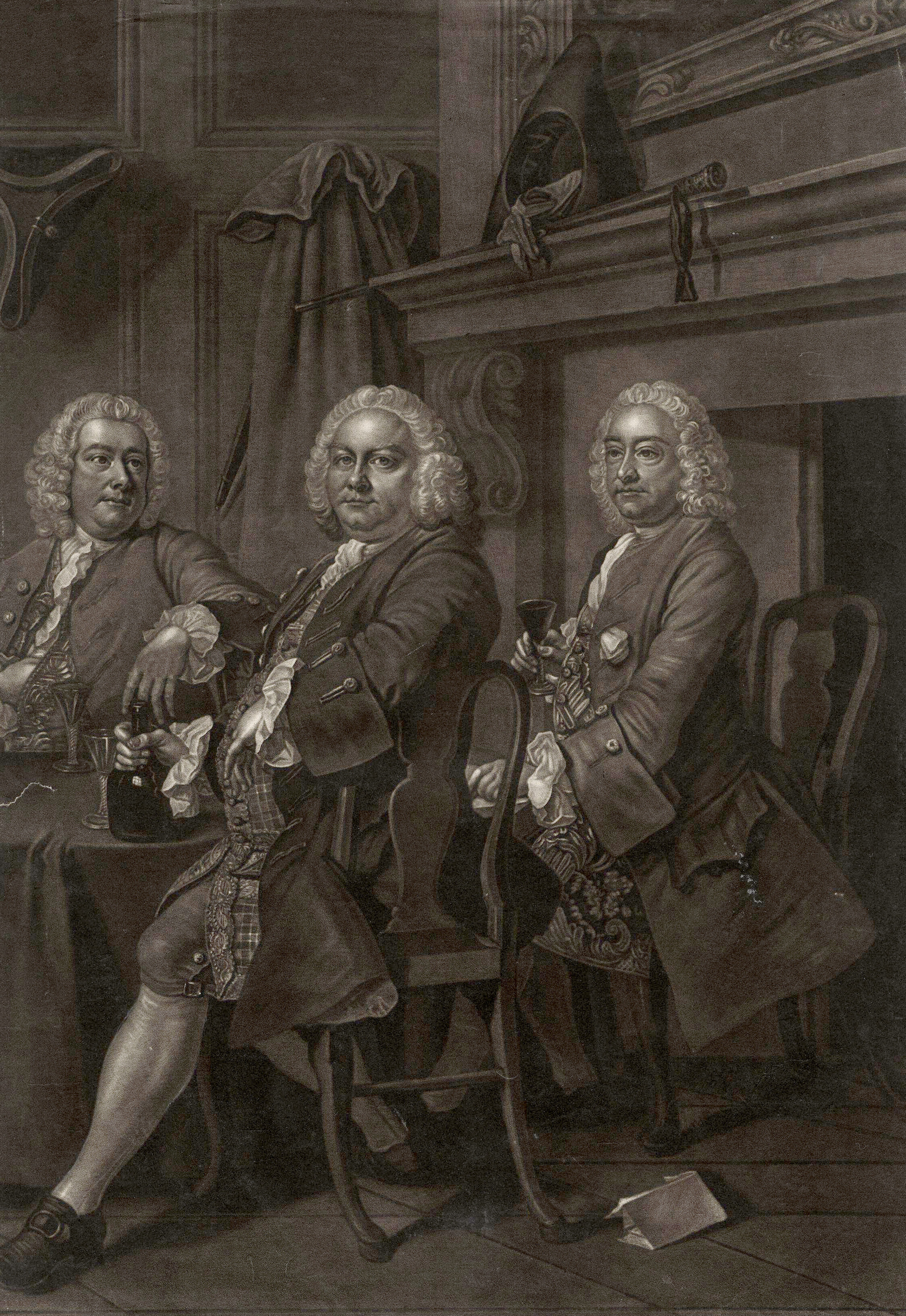
"Benn's Club", with Robert Alsop; William Benn; John Blashford.

John Faber the Younger (1684 – 2 May 1756) was a Dutch portrait engraver active in London.

== Life ==
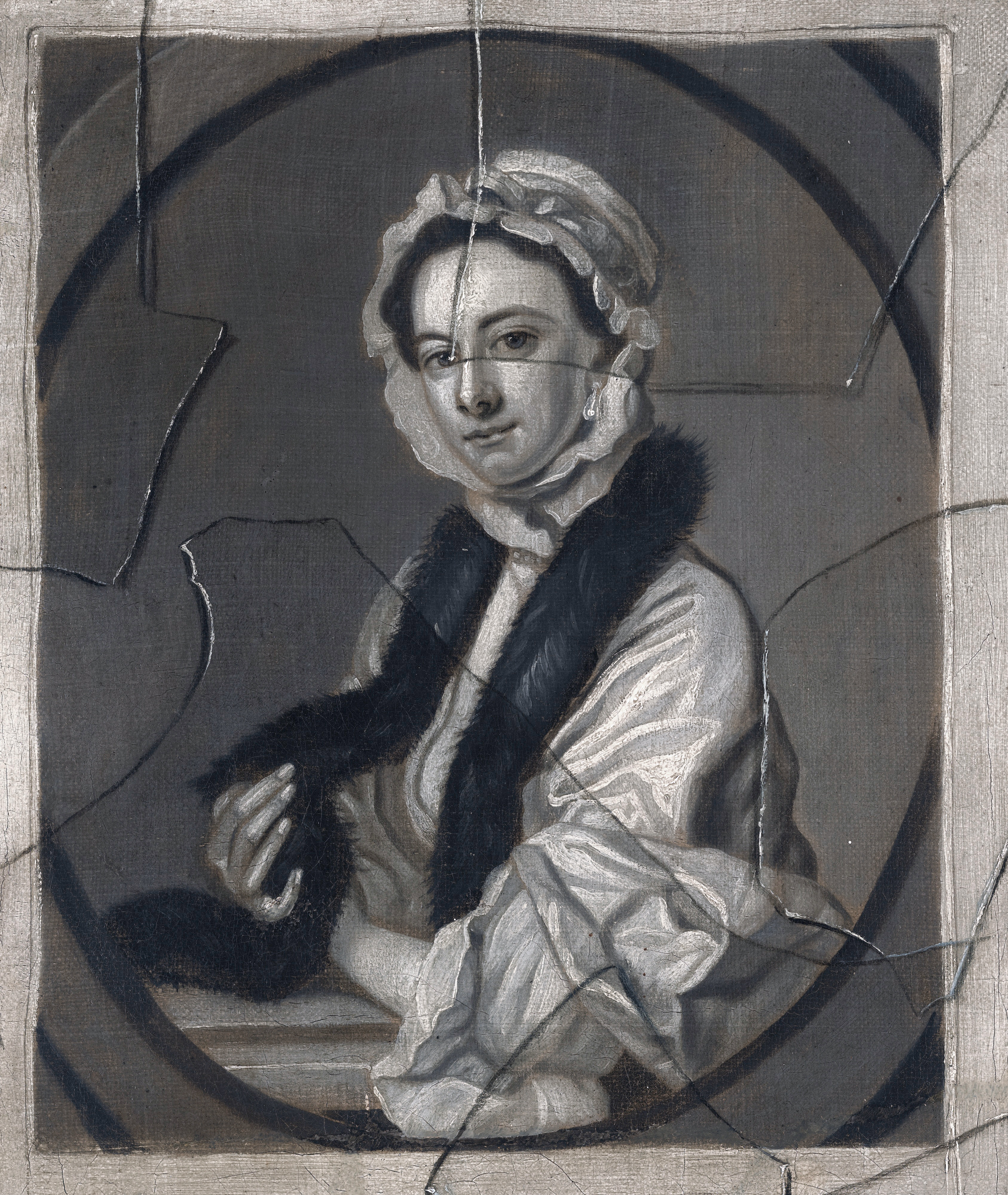
A painted trompe l'oeil with a portrait of Mrs Faber (after Thomas Hudson)

Faber was born in The Hague, the son of the artist John Faber the Elder, and learned mezzotint and drawing from his father after the family's move to London. He then enrolled at the St Martin's Lane Academy.

In later life Faber resided at the Golden Head in Bloomsbury Square, London, where he died of gout on 2 May 1756. From the inscription on a masonic portrait of Frederick, Prince of Wales, it appears that Faber was a Freemason himself. According to Horace Walpole, his widow, of whom there is an engraving by Faber from a portrait by Thomas Hudson, remarried a lawyer of the name of Smith.

== Works ==
Faber concentrated on mezzotints and was prolific. He was commissioned by Sir Godfrey Kneller and Peter Lely to reproduce their works (the 48-image Kit-Kat Club for the former).

Among his early works were portraits of Charles I of England (1717), Charles XII of Sweden (1718), Sir George Byng (1718), Eustace Budgell (1720), and others. Faber presents the transitional period from Kneller to that of Joshua Reynolds and Thomas Gainsborough. More than 400 of his portraits survive.

His works include a whole-length of Jane Collier, and one of Father Couplet (from a picture by Kneller at Windsor); also the portraits of Charles II in his robes of state (after Lely), Ignatius Loyola (after Titian), Don Jose Carreras (after Kneller), and the six aldermen known as "Benn's Club" (after Hudson). He published sets of engravings, among the best known being The Beauties of Hampton Court, The Five Philosophers of England, and The Members of the Kit-Cat Club: the Kit-Cat Club at one time held its meetings in Fountain Court, The Strand, London, where Faber also lived. Faber was engaged on the engravings from 1731 to 1735, and in the latter year they were published by him and Jacob Tonson.

Faber occasionally produced other types of subject, such as The Taking of Namur (after Jan Wyck), St Peter (after Anthony van Dyck), Salvator Mundi (after Robert Browne), and domestic subjects after Philip Mercier.

== Rural Life after Mercier ==
Rural Life engraved in mezzotint by John Faber Jr. after Philippe Mercier
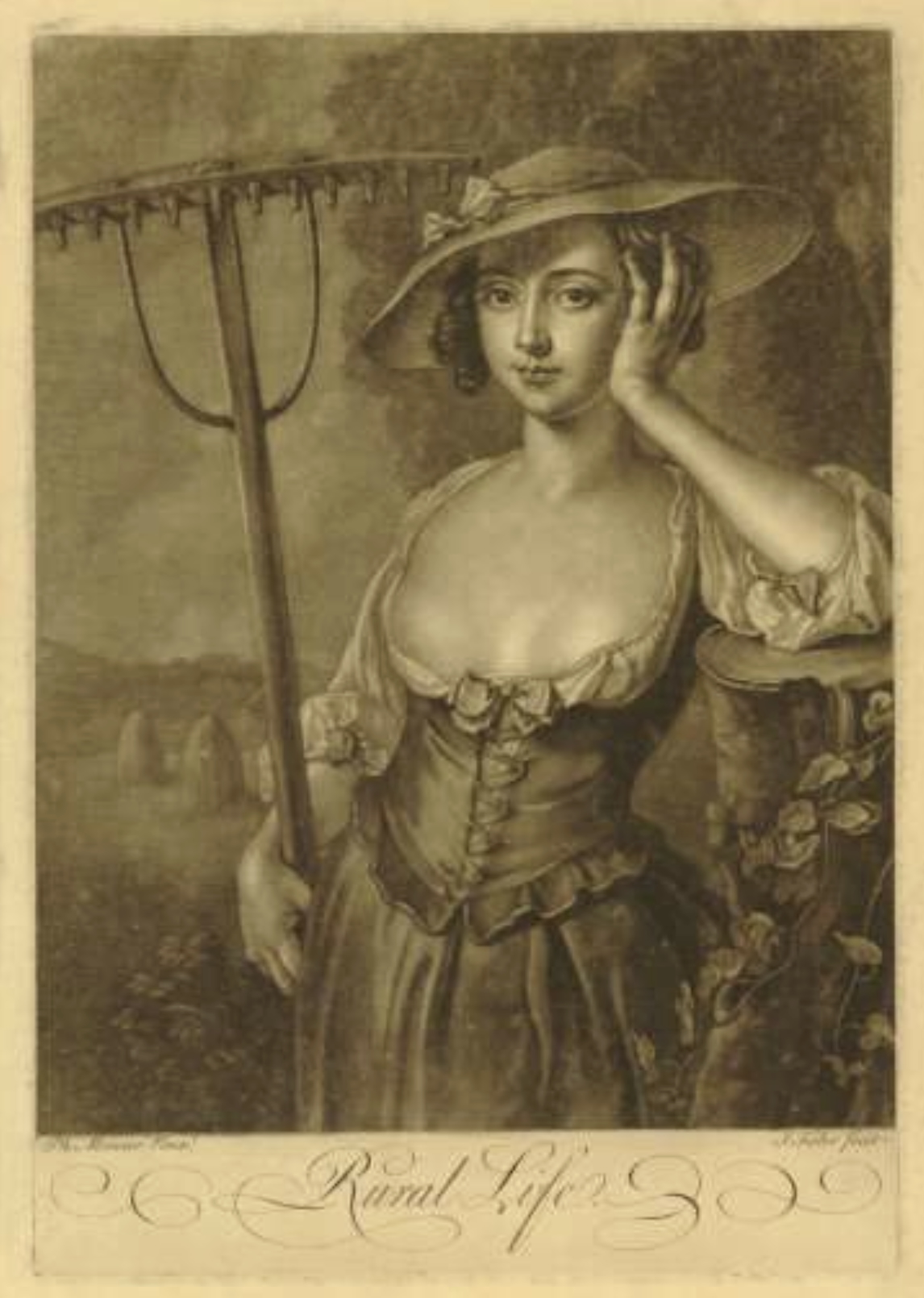
Faber – ‘’Rural Life - A girl resting from haymaking’’ Chaloner Smith 405 British Museum, London

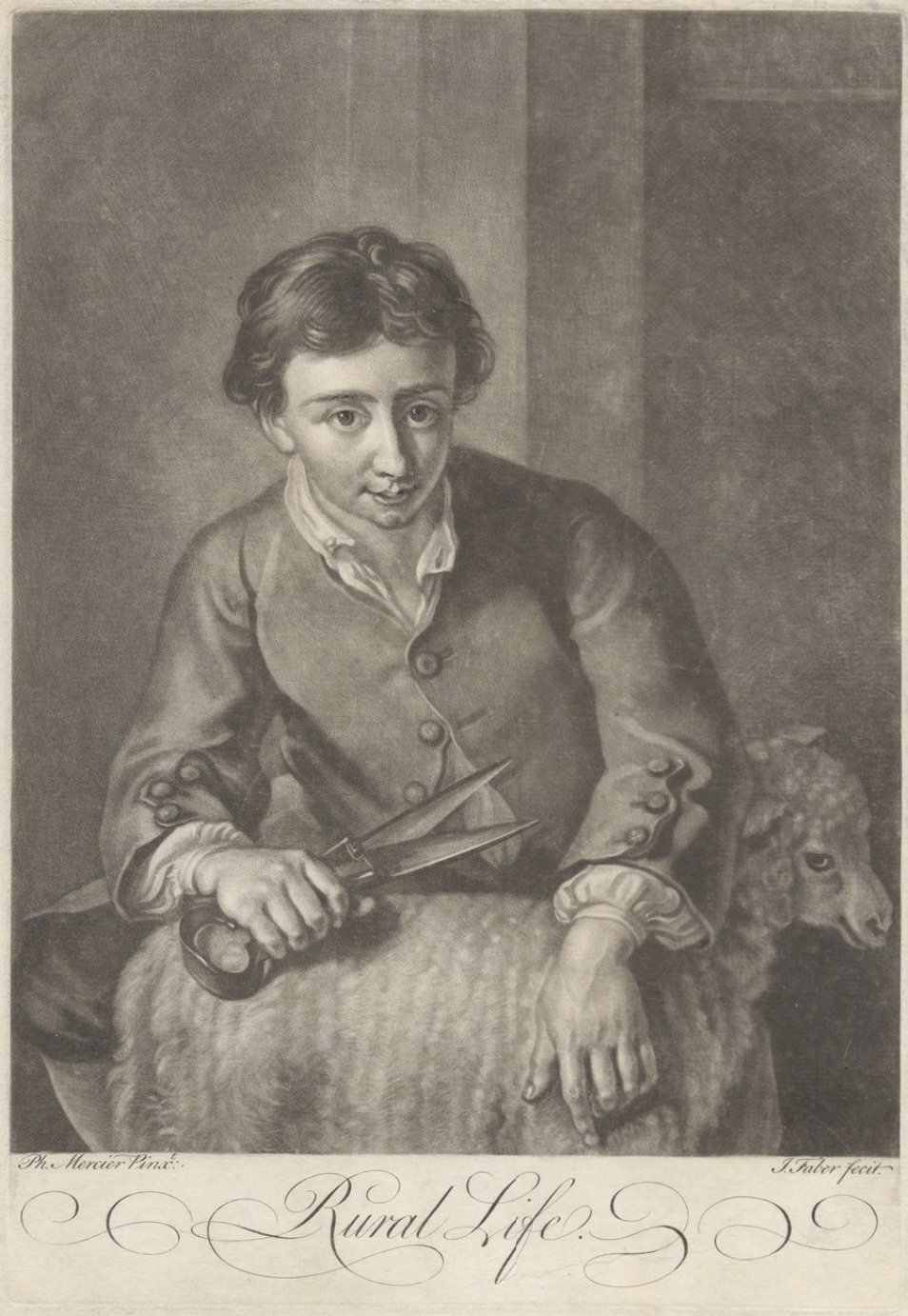
Faber – ‘’Rural Life - Young Male Shearing a Sheep’’ Chaloner Smith 405 Yale Center for British Art

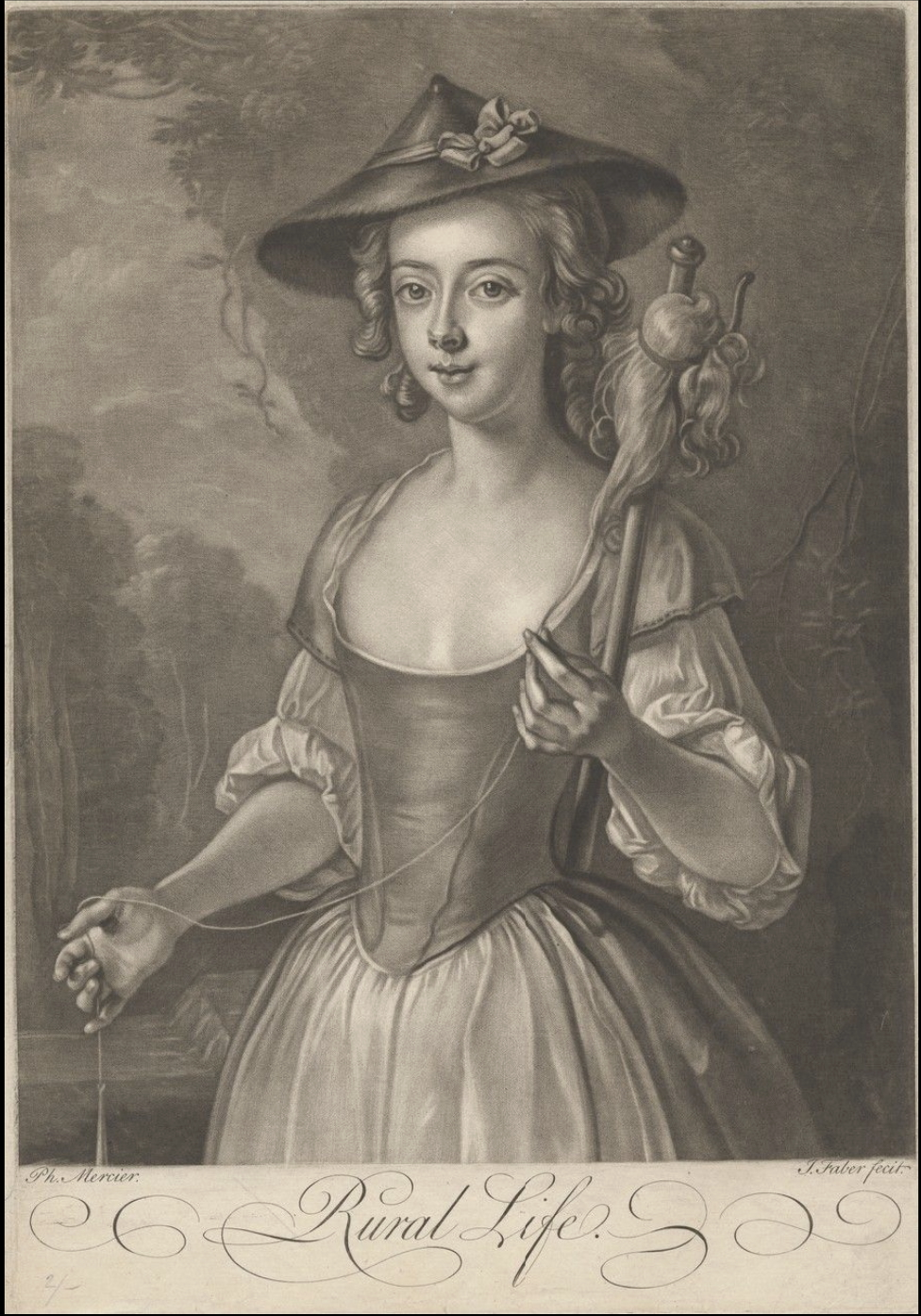
Faber – ‘’Rural Life - A Girl Spinning Thread’’ Chaloner Smith 405 Yale Center for British Art

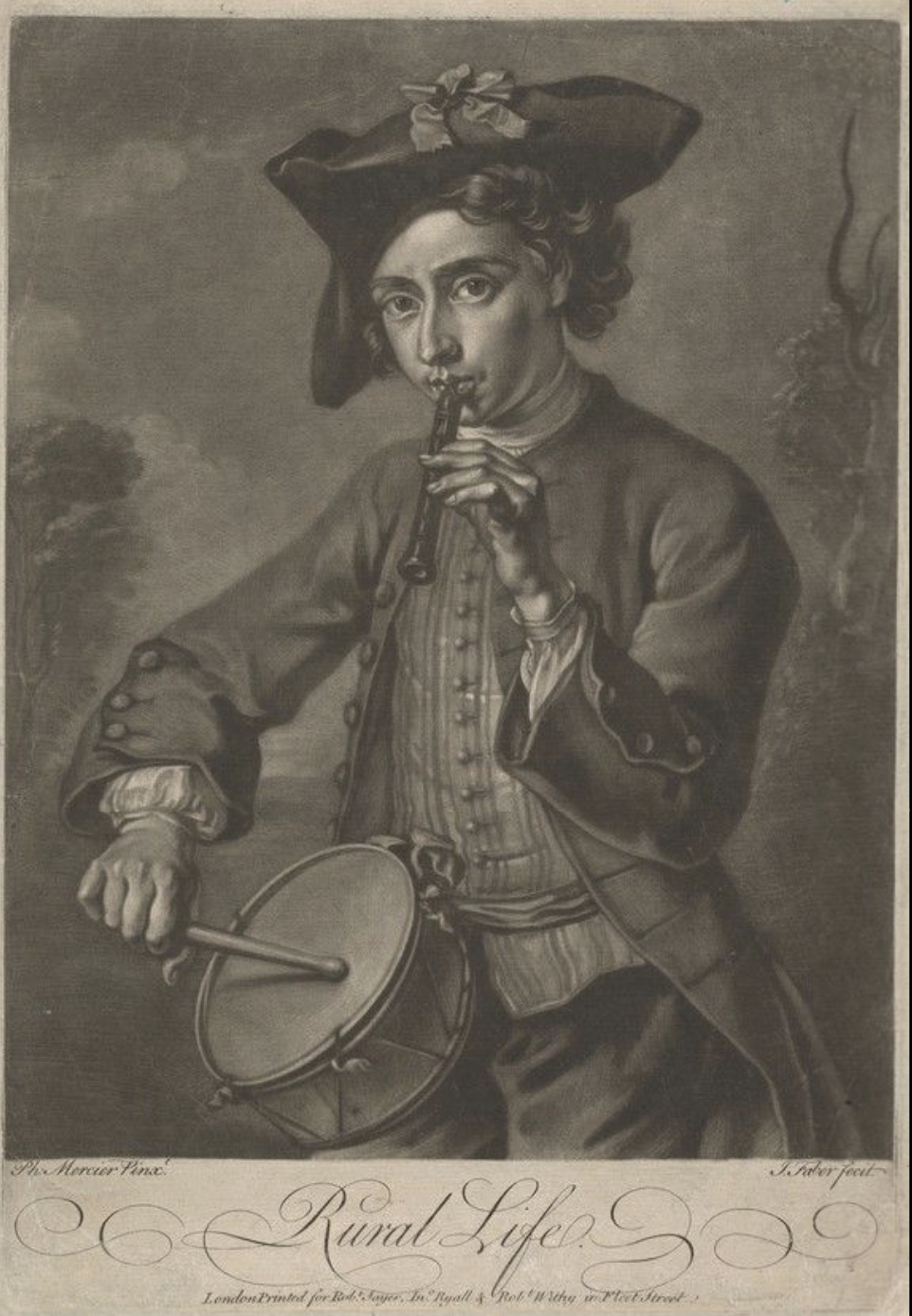
Faber – ‘’Rural Life - The Swain's Amusement’’ Chaloner Smith 407 Yale Center for British Art

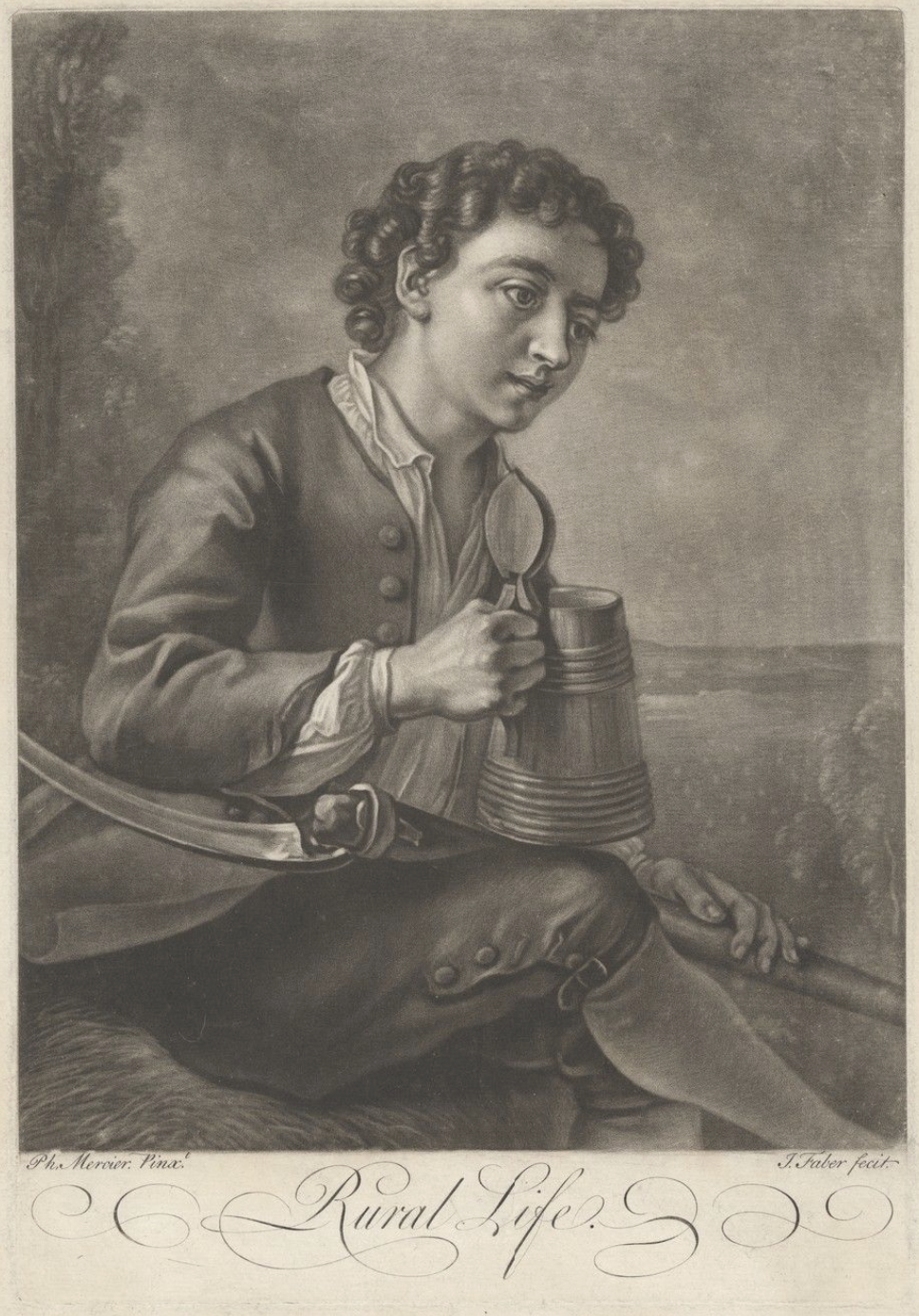
Faber – ‘’Rural Life - The Scytheman's Refreshment’’ Chaloner Smith 405 Yale Center for British Art

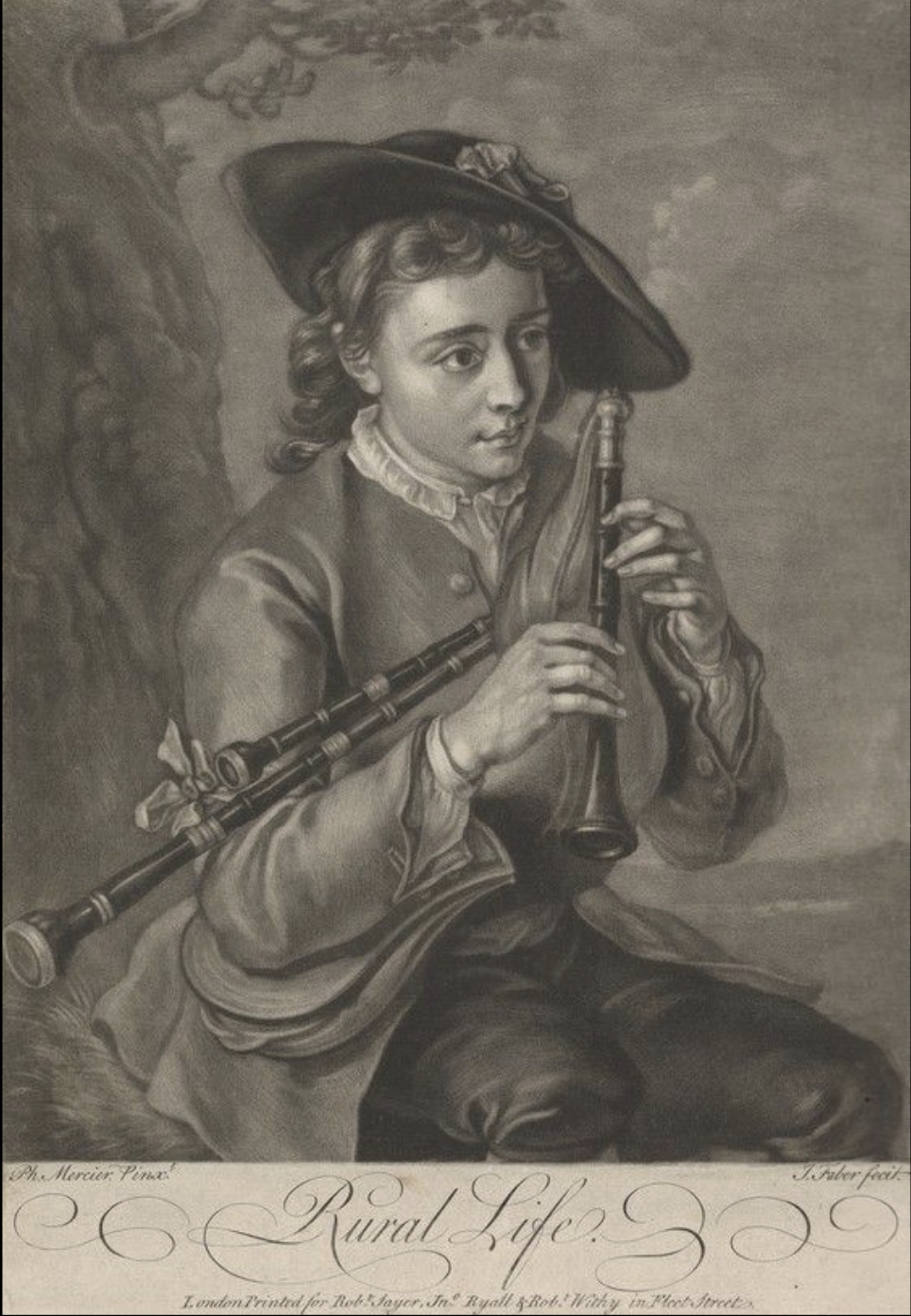
Faber – ‘’Rural Life - Youth Playing Bagpipes’’ Chaloner Smith 405 Yale Center for British Art

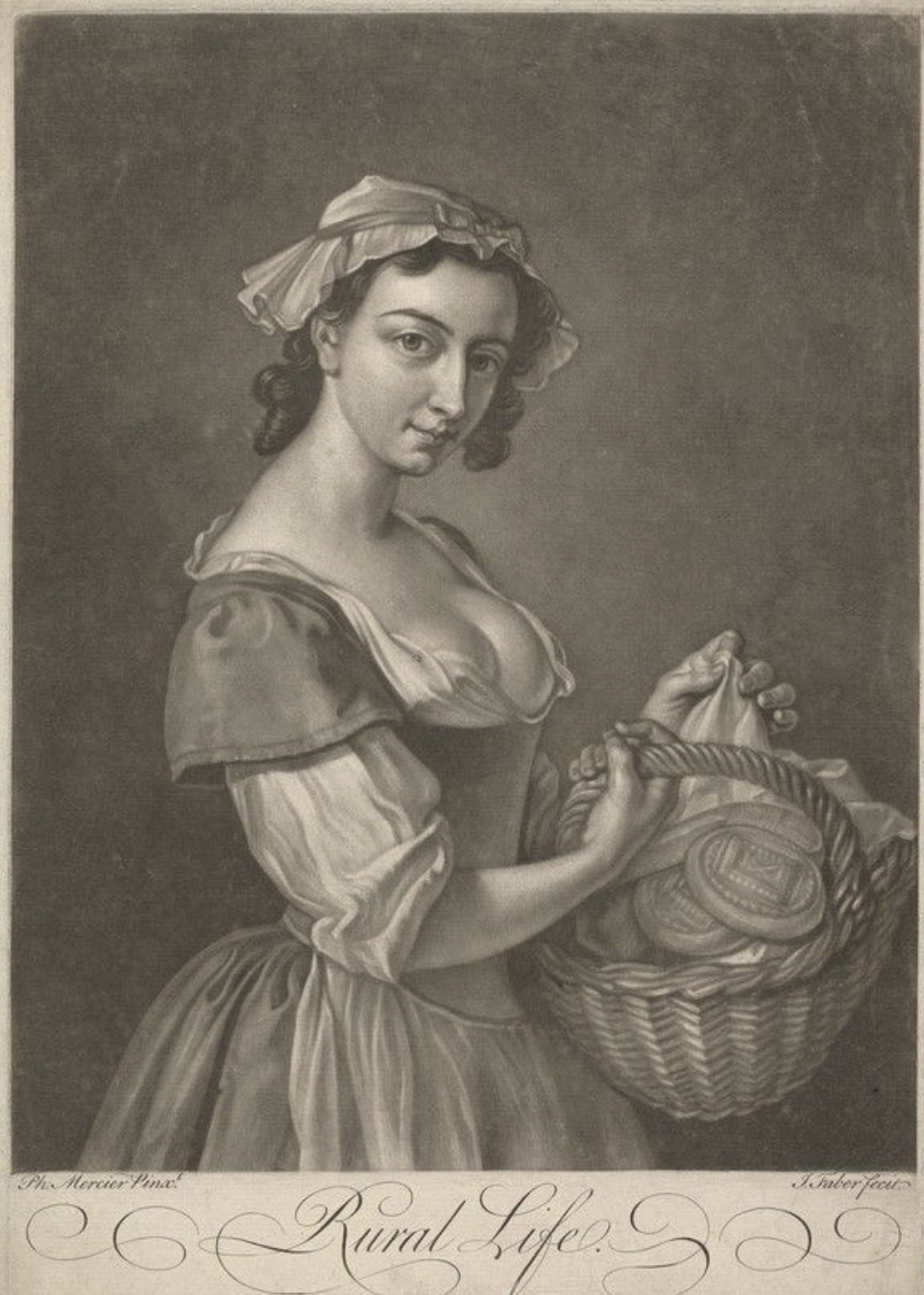
Faber – ‘’Rural Life - The Dairymaid's Occupation’’ Chaloner Smith 407 Yale Center for British Art

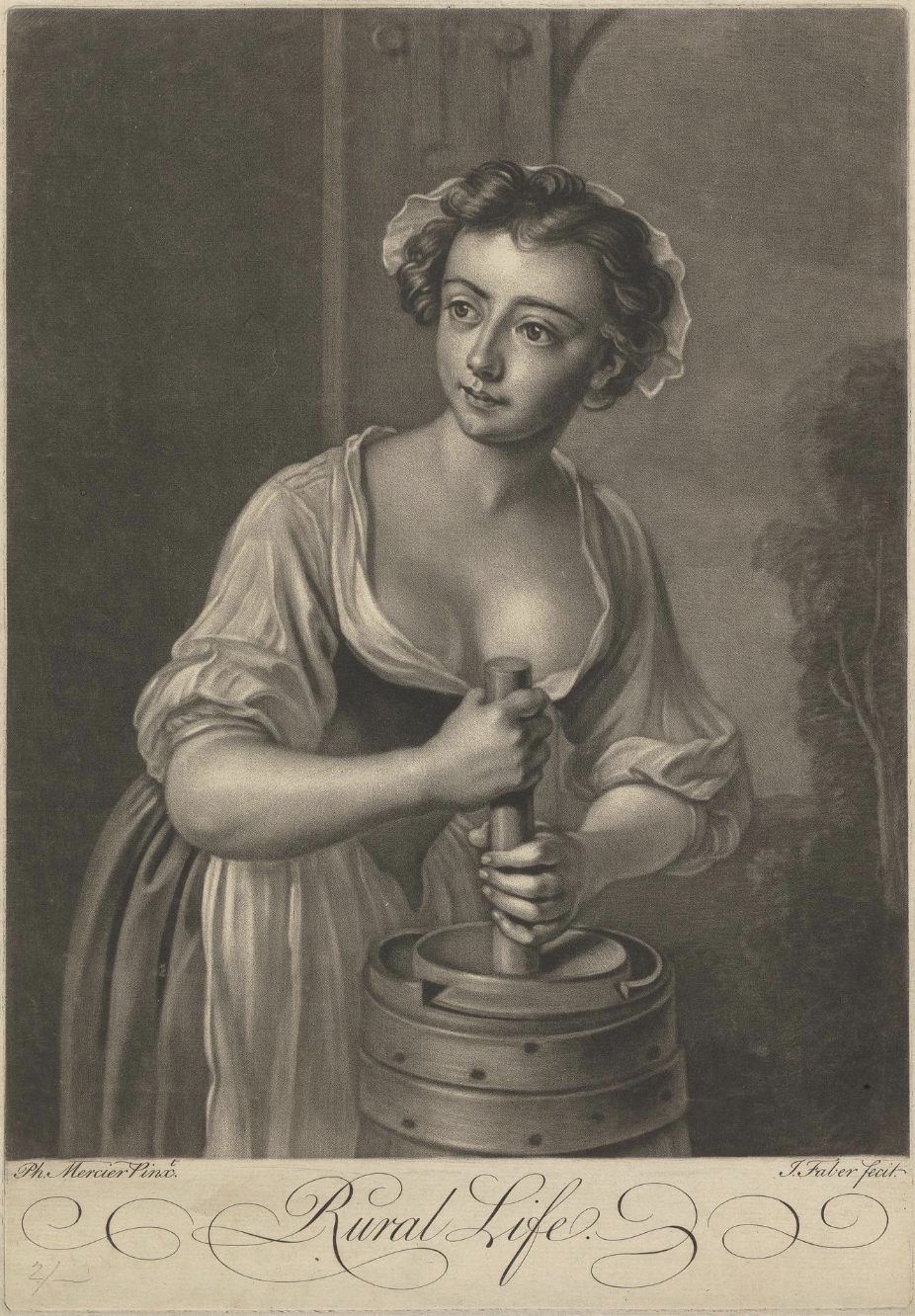
Faber – ‘’Rural Life - The Housewife's Employment’’ Chaloner Smith 405 Yale Center for British Art

== Kit Cat Club Portraits ==
Portraits of the members of the Kit Cat Club (from the total of 47)
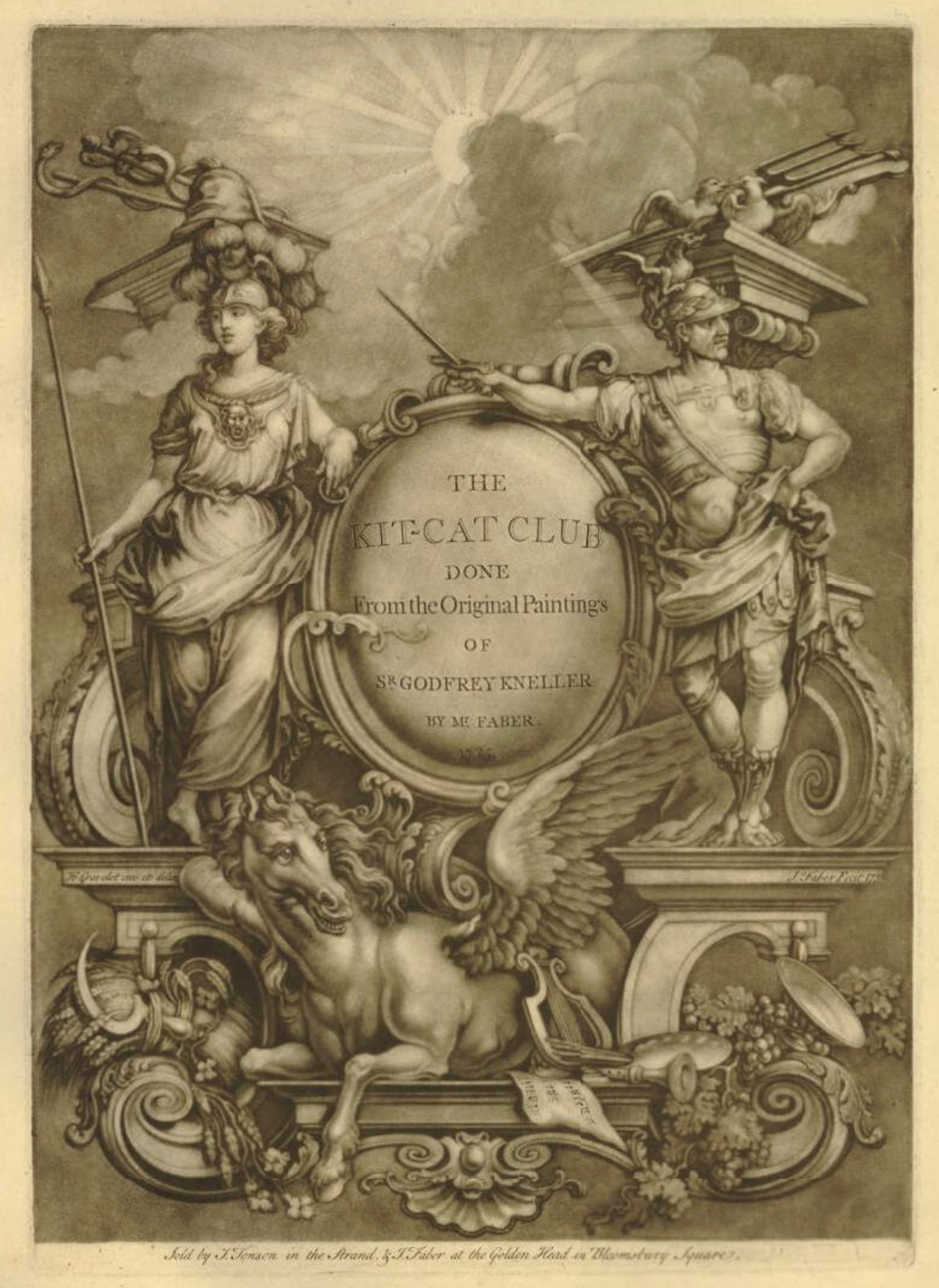
Mezzotint title page from the Kit Cat Club Portraits by John Faber the Younger, 1735. Chaloner Smith 1883; British Mezzotinto portraits from the introduction of the art to the early part of the present century # 208. British Museum

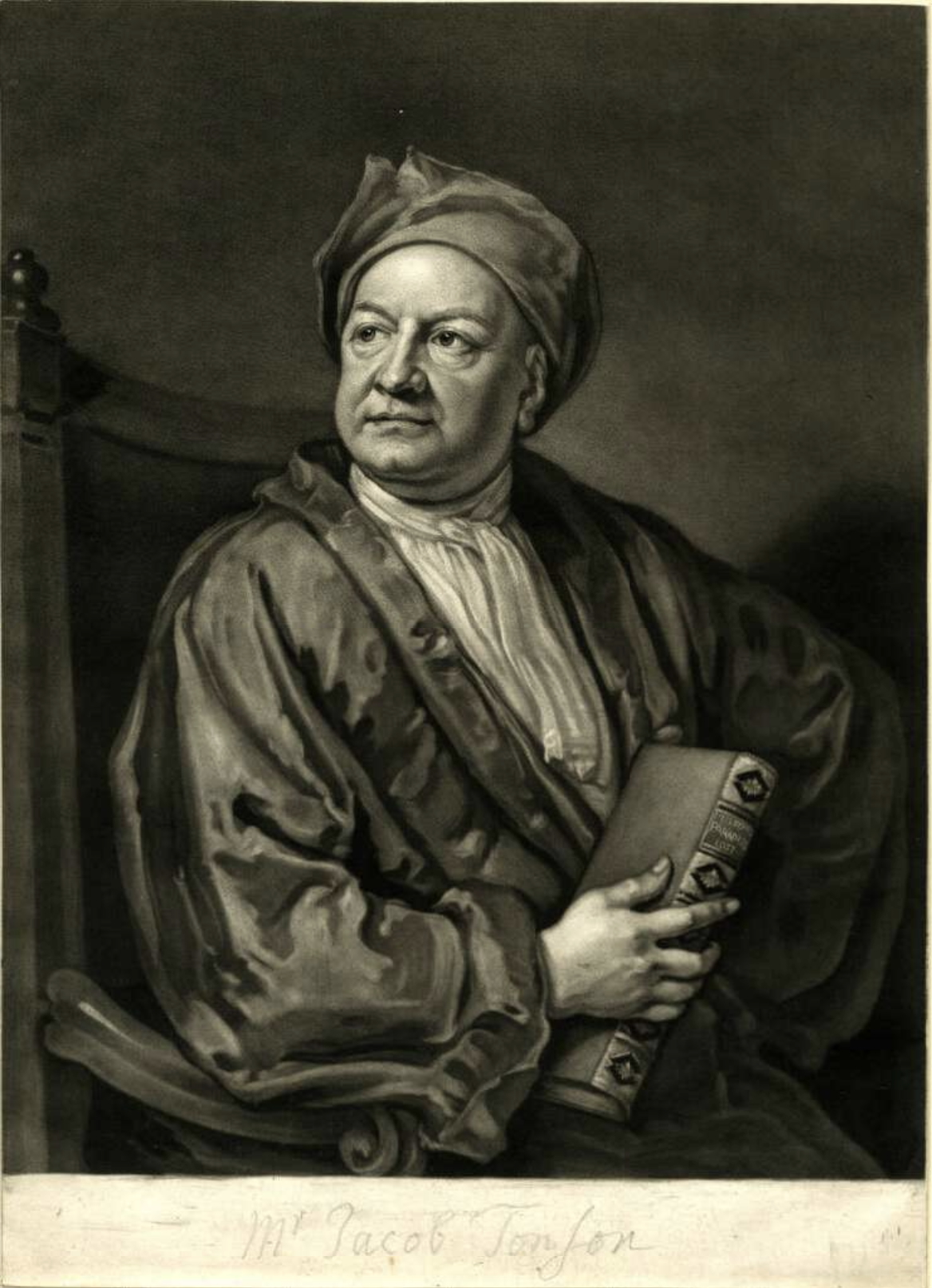
Mezzotint portrait of Jacob Tonson by John Faber the Younger after Sir Godfrey Kneller, 1733. Chaloner Smith 1883; British Mezzotinto portraits from the introduction of the art to the early part of the present century # 208.43. British Museum

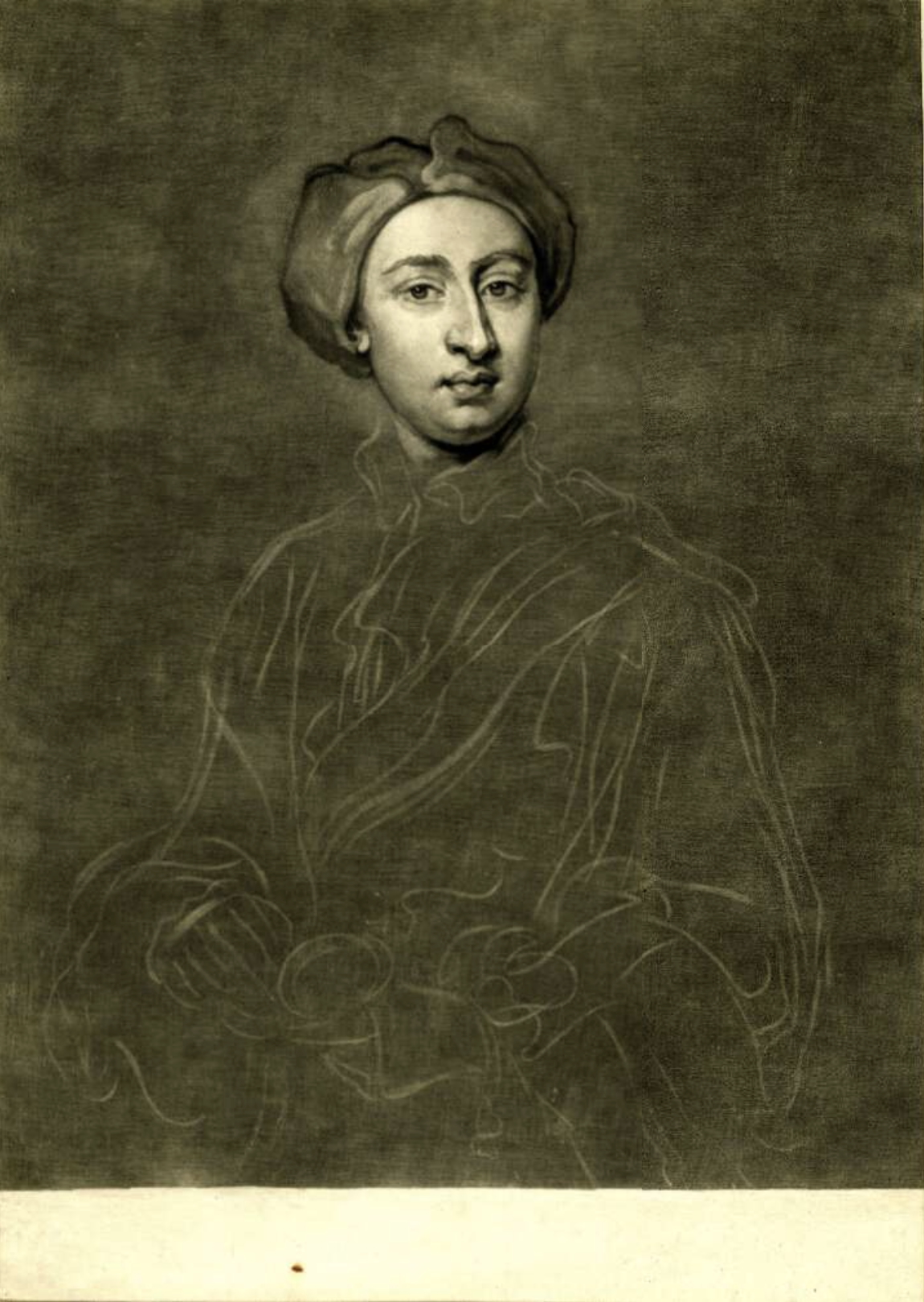
Mezzotint portrait of Theophilus Hasting, Earl of Huntingdon by John Faber the Younger after Sir Godfrey Kneller, 1733 Chaloner Smith 1883; British Mezzotinto portraits from the introduction of the art to the early part of the present century # 208.12. British Museum

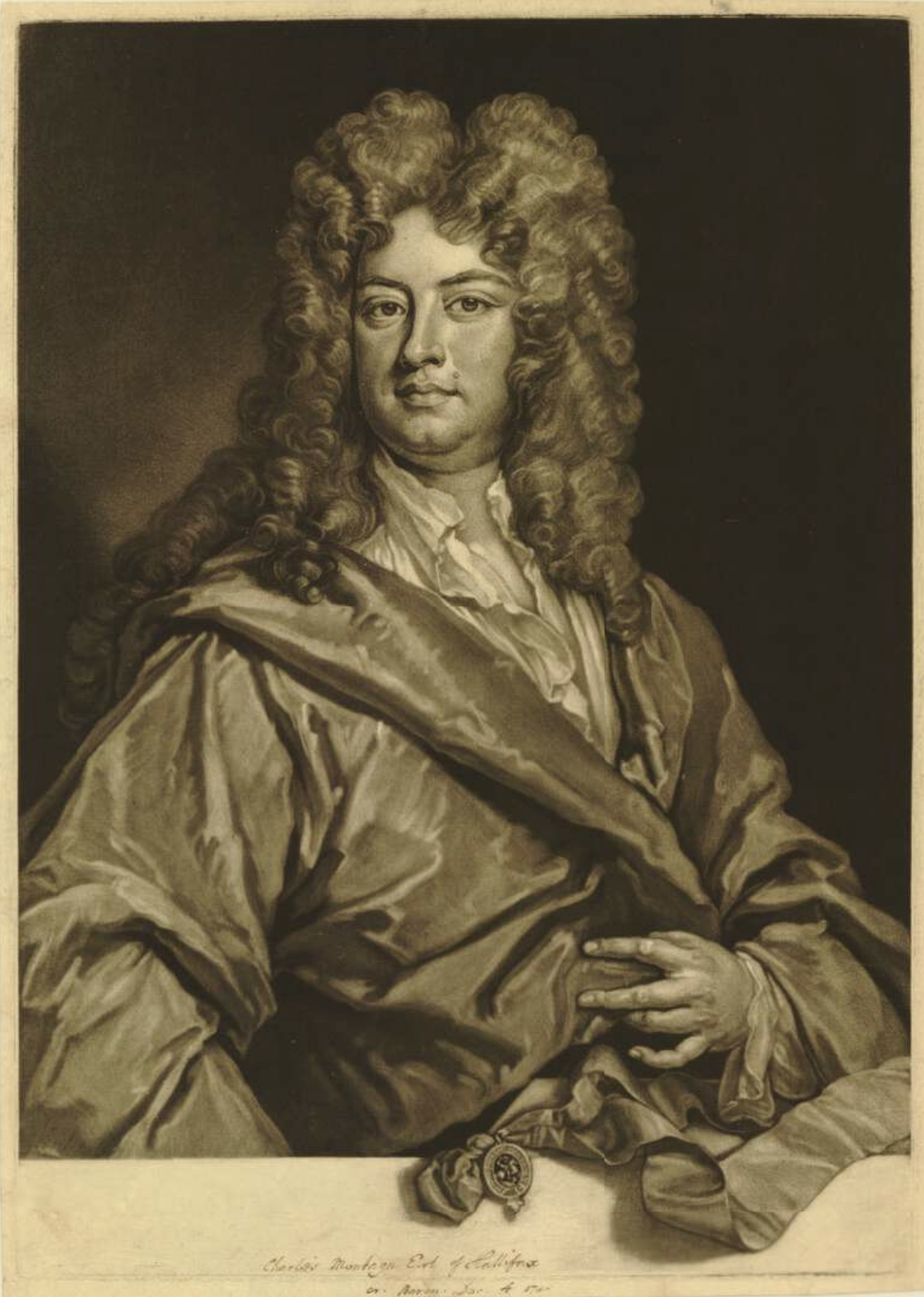
Mezzotint portrait of Charles Montagu, Earl of Halifax by John Faber the Younger after Sir Godfrey Kneller, 1733 Chaloner Smith 1883; British Mezzotinto portraits from the introduction of the art to the early part of the present century # 208.19. British Museum

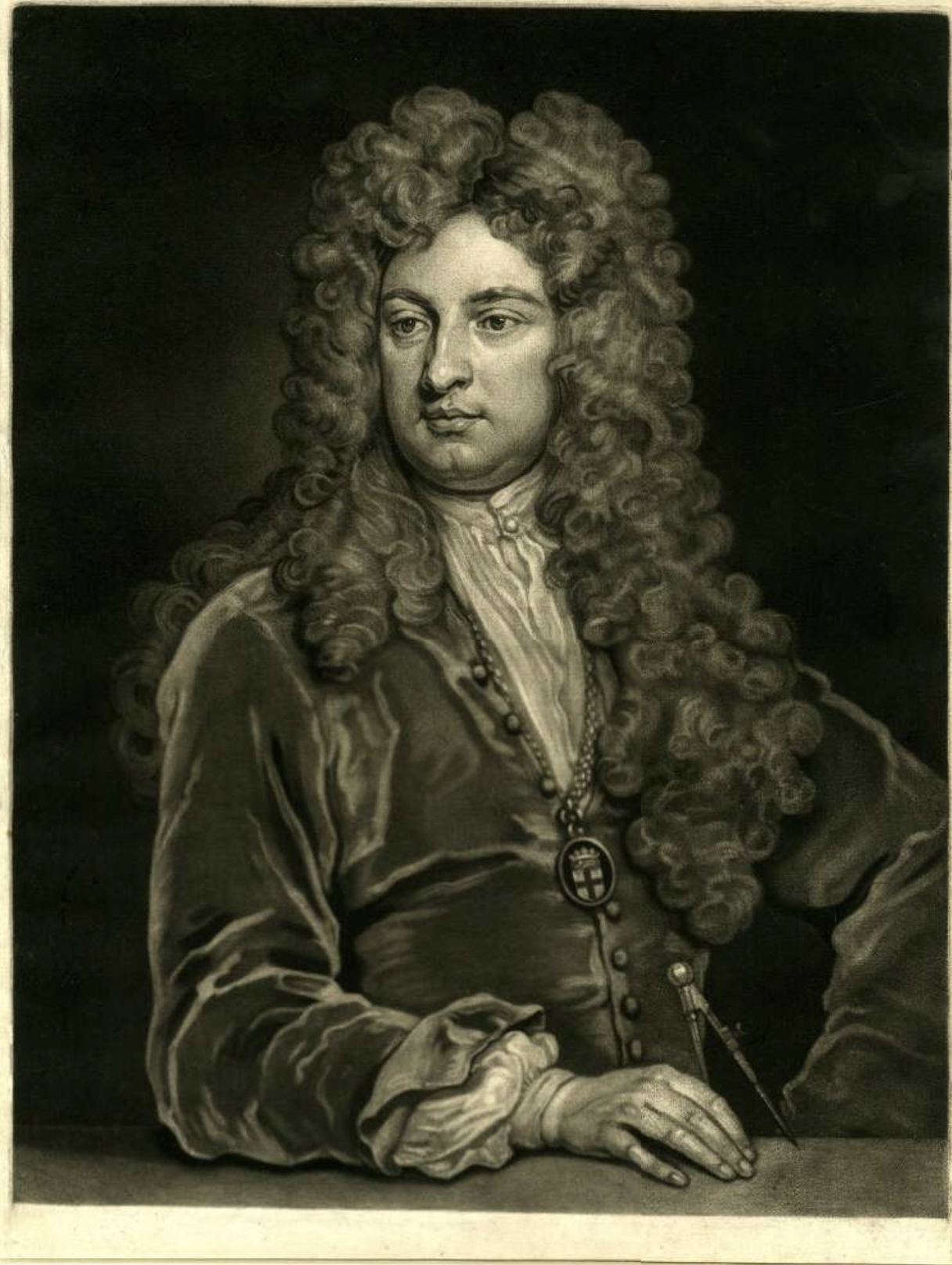
Mezzotint portrait of Sir John Vanbrugh by John Faber the Younger after Sir Godfrey Kneller, 1733. Chaloner Smith 1883; British Mezzotinto portraits from the introduction of the art to the early part of the present century # 208.29. British Museum

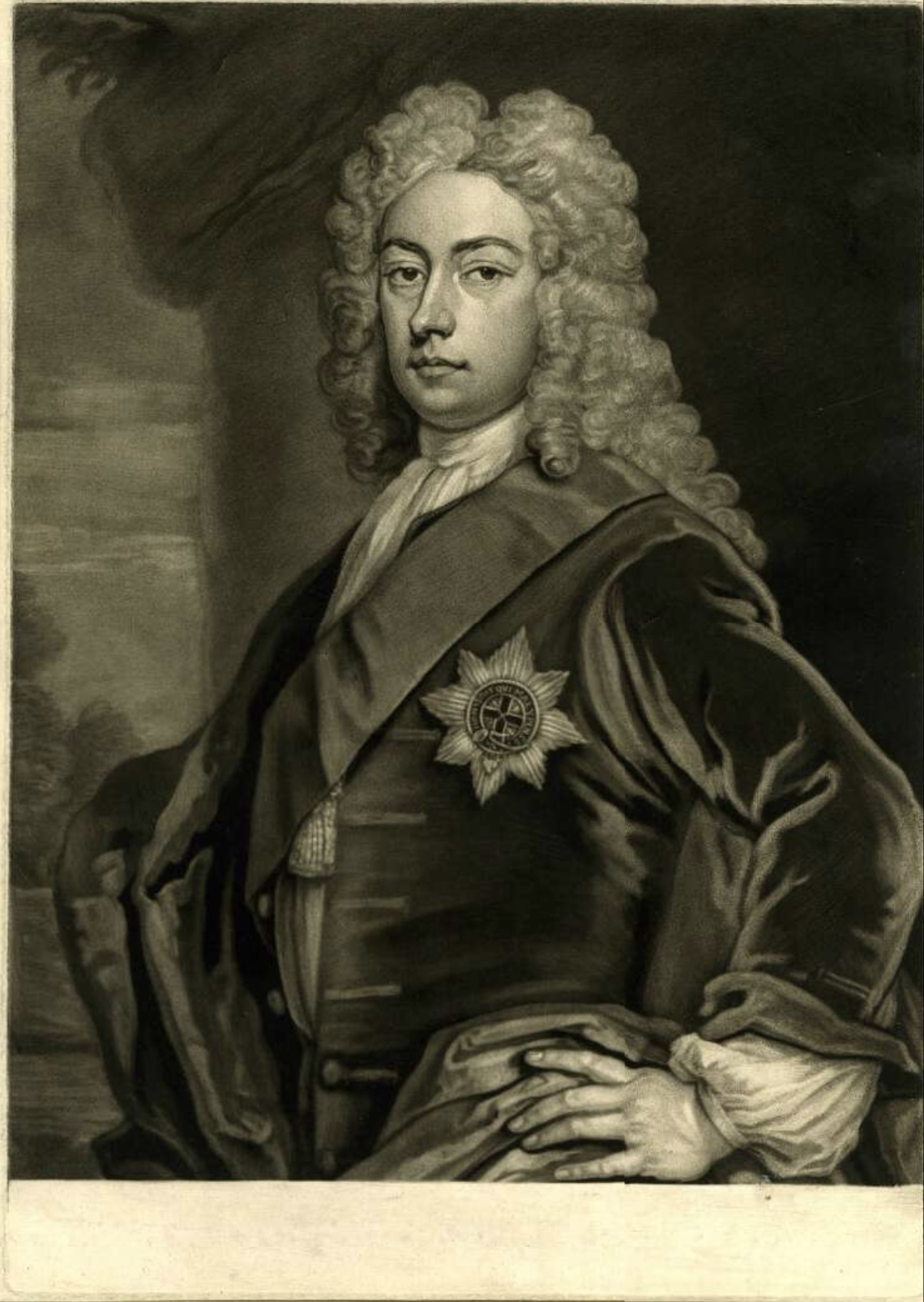
Mezzotint portrait of Richard Boyle, Earl of Burlington by John Faber the Younger after Sir Godfrey Kneller, 1733. Chaloner Smith 1883; British Mezzotinto portraits from the introduction of the art to the early part of the present century # 208.15-16. British Museum

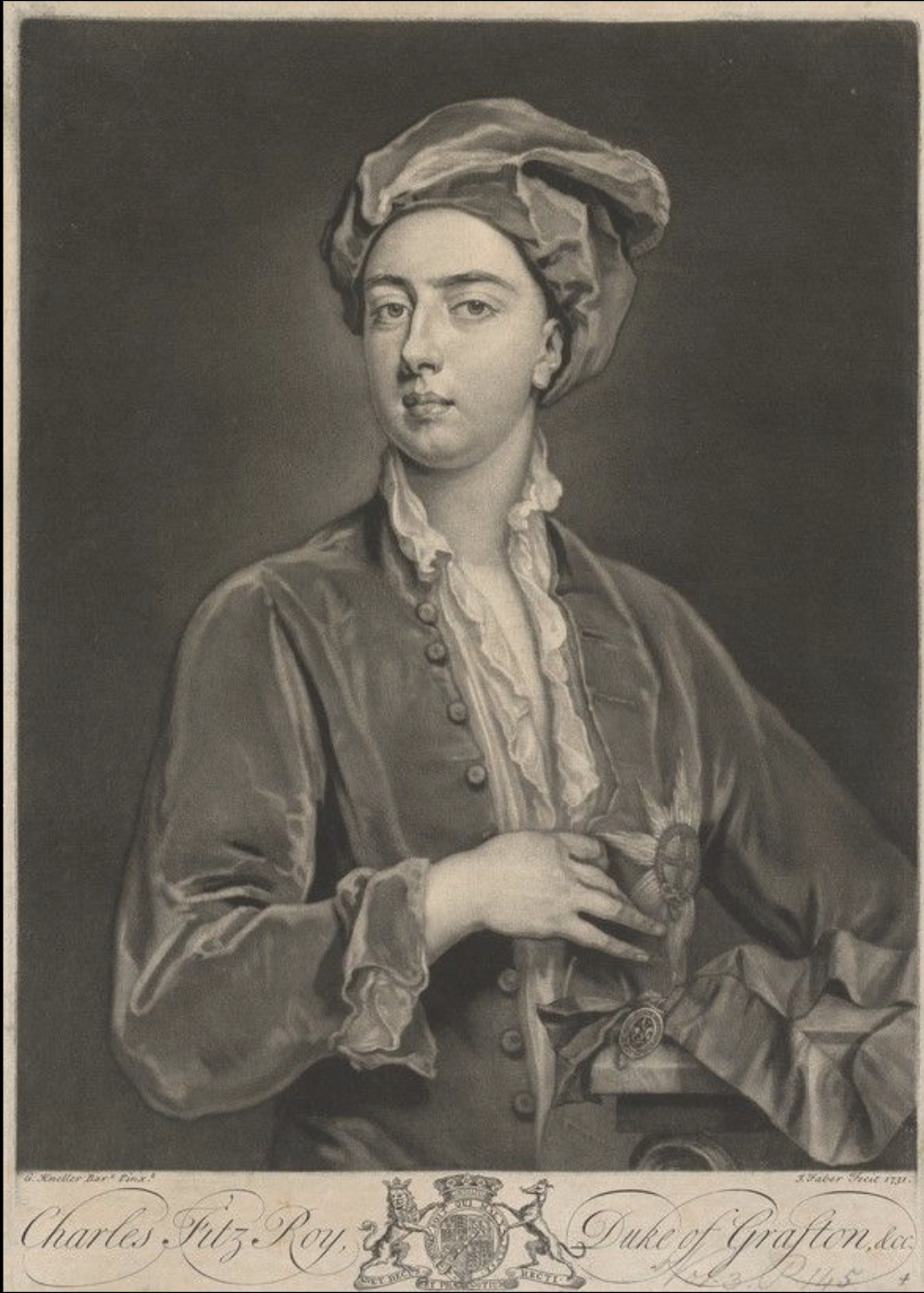
Mezzotint portrait of Charles FitzRoy, 2nd Duke of Grafton by John Faber the Younger after Sir Godfrey Kneller, 1733. Chaloner Smith 1883; British Mezzotinto portraits from the introduction of the art to the early part of the present century # 208.4 Yale Center for British Art

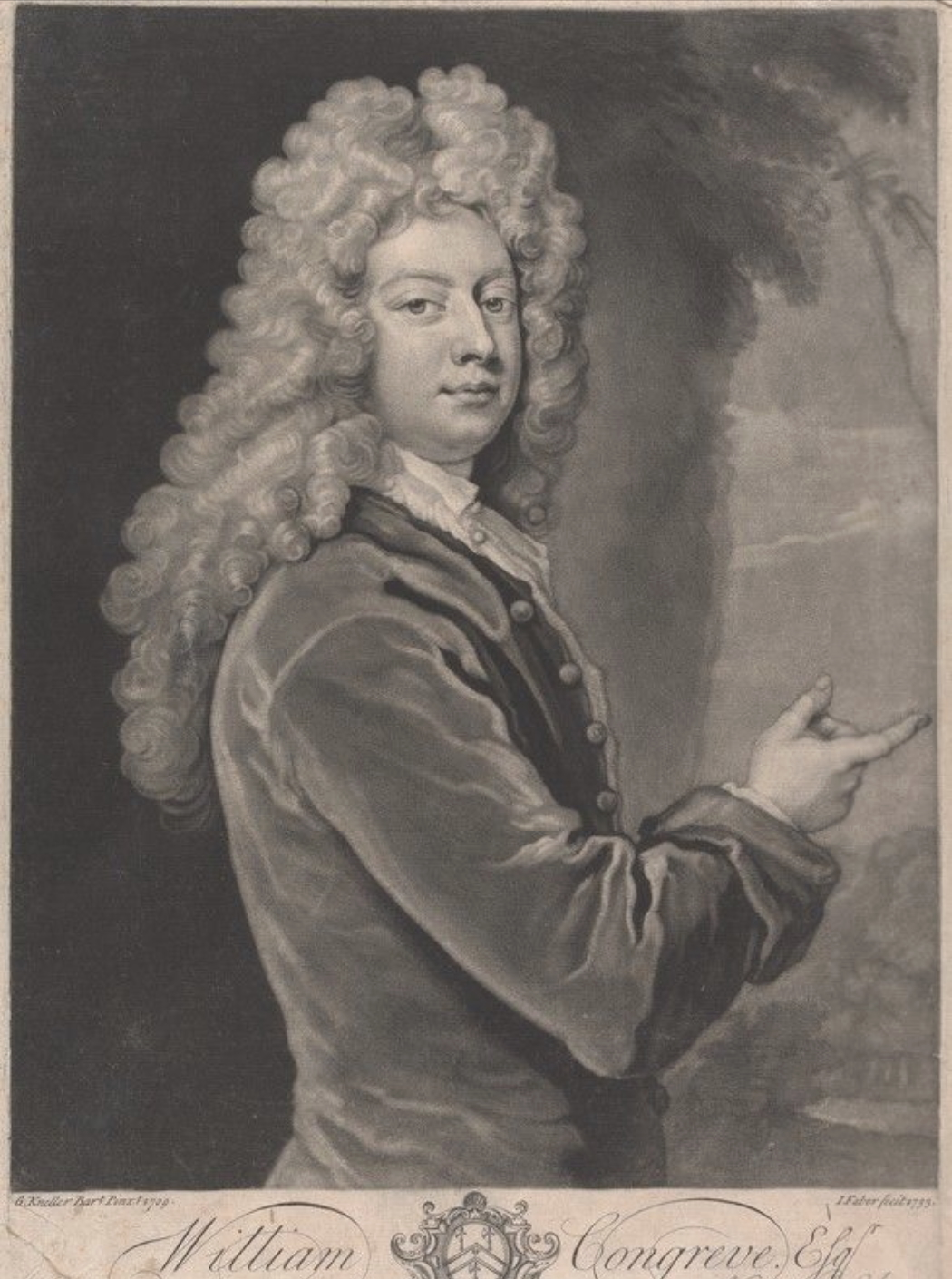
Mezzotint portrait of William Congreve Esq by John Faber the Younger after Sir Godfrey Kneller, 1733. Chaloner Smith 1883; British Mezzotinto portraits from the introduction of the art to the early part of the present century # 208.40 Yale Center for British Art
