= Countess of Stockton =

The Countess of Stockton is a courtesy title granted to the wives of the Earl of Stockton. As the 1st Earl was widowed, the title has been used so far, only by the wives of the 2nd Earl of Stockton:

- Birgitte Macmillan, Countess of Stockton (1970-1991)
- Miranda Macmillan, Countess of Stockton (1995-2020)
