= George Brett (disambiguation) =

George Brett (born 1953) is an American baseball player.

George Brett may also refer to:

- George Edward Brett (1829–1890), British-born American publisher
- George Brett (general) (1886–1963), World War II USAAF general
- George Platt Brett Sr. (1859–1936), British-born American chairman and publisher, son of George Edward Brett
- George Platt Brett (1893–1984), American publisher, son of George Platt Brett, Sr.
- George Sidney Brett (1879–1944), English-Canadian psychologist
- George Wendell Brett (1912–2005), American philatelist
