= Earl of Stockton =

Earldom in the Peerage of the United Kingdom

- Creation date: 24 February 1984
- Created by: Queen Elizabeth II
- Peerage: Peerage of the United Kingdom
- First holder: Harold Macmillan
- Present holder: Alexander Macmillan, 2nd Earl of Stockton
- Heir apparent: Daniel Macmillan, Viscount Macmillan of Ovenden
- Remainder to: the 1st Earl's heirs male of the body lawfully begotten
- Subsidiary titles: Viscount Macmillan of Ovenden
- Status: Extant
- Former seat: Birch Grove
- Motto: MISERES DISCERE SUCCO (I learn to aid the poor)

Earl of Stockton is a title in the Peerage of the United Kingdom. It was created on 24 February 1984 for Harold Macmillan, the former Conservative prime minister (from 1957 to 1963), less than three years before his death in 1986. At the same time he received a subsidiary title Viscount Macmillan of Ovenden, of Chelwood Gate in the County of East Sussex and of Stockton-on-Tees in the County of Cleveland, also in the Peerage of the United Kingdom. The viscountcy is used as a courtesy title by the earl's heir apparent.

The titles are held by the first holder's grandson, being the second earl, who succeeded in 1986 on his grandfather's death (namely Alexander Macmillan, 2nd Earl of Stockton, son of Maurice Macmillan, Viscount Macmillan of Ovenden, only son of the first earl, who died in 1984). The earldom and viscountcy are the most recent hereditary peerages created outside of the royal family and, with the Thatcher baronetcy (which is not a peerage), the only hereditary titles which survive of the few created after 1965.

The family seat was Birch Grove, near Chelwood Gate, East Sussex, but it was sold by the 2nd Earl in 1989.

== Earl of Stockton (1984) ==
- Maurice Harold Macmillan, 1st Earl of Stockton (1894–1986)
- Alexander Daniel Alan Macmillan, 2nd Earl of Stockton (born 1943)

The heir apparent is the present holder's only son, Daniel Maurice Alan Macmillan, Viscount Macmillan of Ovenden (born 1974).

== Line of succession ==
- Maurice Harold Macmillan, 1st Earl of Stockton (1894–1986)
  - Maurice Victor Macmillan, Viscount Macmillan of Ovenden (1921–1984)
    - Alexander Daniel Alan Macmillan, 2nd Earl of Stockton (born 1943)
      - (1) Daniel Maurice Alan Macmillan, Viscount Macmillan of Ovenden (born 1974)
    - Hon. Adam Julian Robert Macmillan (1948–2016)
      - (2) Frederick Maurice Brian Macmillan (born 1990)
      - (3) Joshua Gabriel P. Macmillan (born 1995)
    - (4) Hon. David Maurice Benjamin Macmillan (born 1957)
      - (5) Finn Joshua Marcus Macmillan (born 1995)

Earls of Stockton

Daniel MacMillan; 1813–1857 | Alexander MacMillan; 1818–1896
Maurice Crawford Macmillan; 1853–1936
Earl of Stockton and Viscount Macmillan of Ovenden, 1984
(Maurice) Harold Macmillan; 1894–1986; 1st Earl of Stockton, etc.
Maurice Victor Macmillan; 1921–1984 styled Viscount Macmillan of Ovenden
Alexander Daniel Alan Macmillan b. 1943; 2nd Earl of Stockton, etc. | Adam Julian Robert Macmillan; 1948–2016 | David Maurice Benjamin Macmillan b. 1957
Daniel Maurice Alan Macmillan b. 1974 styled Viscount Macmillan of Ovenden | Frederick Maurice Brian Macmillan b. 1990 | Joshua Gabriel P. Macmillan b. 1995 | Finn Joshua Marcus Macmillan b. 1995
Heir apparent to the Earldom of Stockton

== Arms ==
Coat of arms of Macmillan, Earls of Stockton
| Crest Upon a helm with a wreath or azure and sable within sprigs of oak fructed or a dexter cubit arm and a sinister arm embowed both proper the dexter hand gauntletted or and with the other brandishing a two handed sword proper hilt pommel and quillons sable. Escutcheon Argent a chief or overall between three open books proper edged or and bound azure those in chief inscribed respectively in letters sable ` Miseres’ and ` Discere’ and that in base also in letters sable inscribed ` Succo’ and as many mullets azure a lion rampant sable. Supporters Dexter, a lion rampant gules; Sinister, an American bald headed eagle proper the compartment comprising a crenelated wall proper in the portal thereof an anchor azure and joined on either side by two bars wavy azure to a grassy mount growing from that on the dexter a long branch and from that on the sinister a thistle both proper. |

== Bibliography ==
- Kidd, Charles & Williamson, David (editors). Debrett's Peerage and Baronetage (1990 edition). New York: St Martin's Press, 1990.
- Leigh Rayment's Peerage Pages
