= Macmillan Inc. =

American publishing company

- Parent company: Macmillan Publishers (1869–1951)
- Founded: August 1869
- Founder: George Edward Brett
- Defunct: February 1994
- Successor: Simon & Schuster; Gale; McGraw Hill
- Country of origin: United States
- Headquarters location: New York City, U.S.

Macmillan Inc. (also known as Macmillan US, and formerly the Macmillan Company) was an American book publishing company originally established as the American division of the British Macmillan Publishers. The two were later separated and acquired by other companies, with the remnants of the original American division of Macmillan present in McGraw-Hill Education's Macmillan/McGraw-Hill textbooks, Gale's Macmillan Reference USA division, and some trade imprints of Simon & Schuster (Scribner, Free Press, and Atheneum Books) that were transferred when both companies were owned by Paramount Communications.

The German publisher Holtzbrinck, which bought the British Macmillan in 1999, purchased American rights to the Macmillan name in 2001 and rebranded its American division with it in 2007.

== Company history ==
=== Brett family ===
George Edward Brett opened the first Macmillan office in the United States in 1869. Macmillan sold its U.S. operations to the Brett family, George Platt Brett Sr. and George Platt Brett, Jr., in 1896, resulting in the creation of an American company, Macmillan, Inc., in which Macmillan Publishers held a stake until 1951. Even with the split of the American company from its parent company in Britain, George Brett Jr. and Harold Macmillan remained close personal friends.

George P. Brett Jr. made the following comments in a letter dated 23 January 1947 to Daniel Macmillan about his family's devotion to the American publishing industry:

For the record my grandfather was employed by Macmillan's of England as a salesman. He came to the United States with his family in the service of Macmillan's of England and built up a business of approximately $50,000 before he died. He was succeeded . . . by my father, who eventually incorporated The Macmillan Company of New York and built up business of about $9,000,000. I succeeded my father, and we currently doing a business of approximately $12,000,000. So then, the name of Brett and the name of Macmillan have been and are synonymous in the United States.

Under the leadership of the Brett family, Macmillan served as the publisher of American authors Winston Churchill, Margaret Mitchell, author of Gone with the Wind, and Jack London, author of White Fang and Call of the Wild.

The Bretts remained in control of the American offices of Macmillan from its creation in 1869 to the early 1960s, "a span matched by few other families in the history of United States business."

Macmillan Publishers sold its stake in the U.S. subsidiary in 1951 and later re-entered the American publishing industry with the founding of St. Martin's Press in 1952.

==== Velikovsky's Worlds in Collision ====
Despite the strong protest of leading astronomers of the time, in 1950 Macmillan published Imanuel Velikovsky's Worlds in Collision in the U.S. When a boycott threatened Macmillan, it transferred the book to Doubleday

=== Mergers and end ===
Macmillan, Inc., merged with Crowell Collier Publishing Company in 1961. The combined company became a media giant. It changed its name in 1965 to Crowell, Collier & Macmillan, Inc., and again in 1973 to Macmillan, Inc.

In 1979, Thomas Mellon Evans bought a large stake in Macmillan Inc., which was later the target of an unsuccessful bid by Mattel and ABC. Macmillan Inc. then sold several non-publishing divisions. In 1980, Macmillan Inc. sold musical instrument maker C.G. Conn. In 1981, Macmillan Inc. sold Hagstrom Map, the bookstore Brentano's and the printer Alco‐Gravure.

In 1981, Macmillan Inc. acquired the children's publisher Bradbury Press. In 1982, Macmillan Inc. sold its British division, Cassell, to CBS. In 1984, Macmillan Inc. acquired the Scribner Book Companies and the textbook publishers Sieber & McIntyre, Dellen Publishing, and Pennwell Books. The following year, Macmillan Inc. acquired the publishing operations of ITT (Sams, Bobbs-Merrill, legal publisher Michie Co., trade magazine company Intertec, Marquis Who's Who, and G. K. Hall & Co.). Bobbs-Merrill was subsequently closed, with its remaining books moved to Macmillan. In 1986, Macmillan Inc. sold the music publisher G. Schirmer, Inc. to Music Sales Group. In 1987, Macmillan Inc. acquired the educational publisher Laidlaw from Doubleday. In 1988, Macmillan Inc. acquired the educational publisher Jossey-Bass.

The company was acquired by the controversial British tycoon Robert Maxwell's Maxwell Communication Corporation in 1989. Later in 1989, Macmillan acquired Prentice Hall Information from Simon & Schuster and sold Intertec, Macmillan Book Clubs, and Gryphon Editions to K-III Communications (now Rent Group). Maxwell Macmillan Professional and Business Reference Publishing (the former Prentice Hall division) was sold to Thomson Professional Publishing. Macmillan's directories (led by Marquis Who's Who and National Register Publishing) were sold to Reed Publishing. Michie was sold to Mead. Macmillan also sold the department store Gump's, the trade school Katharine Gibbs, and part of its stake in language school Berlitz.

Maxwell died in 1991, and Macmillan began selling properties and eventually filed for bankruptcy. Paramount acquired Macmillan Computer Publishing. Standard Rate & Data Service was sold to OAG, a sister Maxwell company. Collier's Encyclopedia was sold to Planeta and DeAgostini. What remaining of Macmillan Inc. was eventually sold to Simon & Schuster/Paramount Communications for $552.8 million and finalized in February 1994. (At the time, Viacom had just purchased S&S via the acquisition of its former parent company Paramount Communications; it was owned for several years by corporate successor Paramount Global and now owned by Kohlberg Kravis Roberts.) The Macmillan and Atheneum adult trade publications were merged into Scribner. Macmillan Publishing USA became the name of Simon & Schuster's reference division (while Macmillan Inc. became simply a legal name for it). Pearson acquired the Macmillan name in America in 1998, following its purchase of the Simon & Schuster educational and professional group (which included Macmillan Inc. and its properties). Pearson merged the acquired Simon & Schuster divisions with Addison Wesley Longman to form Pearson Education (including Macmillan Computer Publishing). Pearson closed the children's reference imprints of Macmillan Library Reference in preparation for a sale. Pearson sold the Macmillan Reference USA division (which included Scribner Reference and G. K. Hall) to Thomson Gale and Macmillan General Reference (except Complete Idiot's Guides) to IDG Books in 1999.

Macmillan's school publishing operations (including Glencoe, Barnell Loft, and Benziger) were merged into a joint operation with McGraw-Hill in 1989. McGraw-Hill acquired full ownership of Macmillan/McGraw-Hill in 1993 after Maxwell's death.

=== Holtzbrinck acquired Macmillan name in the United States ===
Holtzbrinck purchased most of the rights to the Macmillan name from Pearson in 2001, but not any of the businesses then associated with it. Holtzbrinck rebranded its U.S. division with the name in 2007.

The online user-maintained database Jacketflap reports these constituent American publishers of Holtzbrinck's Macmillan division (August 2010):

Farrar Straus and Giroux, Henry Holt & Company, W.H. Freeman and Worth Publishers, Palgrave Macmillan, Bedford/St. Martin's, Picador, Roaring Brook Press, St. Martin's Press, Tor Books, and Bedford Freeman & Worth Publishing Group.

== Publishers ==
- George Edward Brett
- George Platt Brett Sr.
- George Platt Brett Jr.

== See also ==
- Richard M. Brett
- Macmillan Publishers
