= Daniel Macmillan =

Daniel Macmillan may refer to:

- Daniel MacMillan (1813–1867), Scottish publisher
- Daniel Macmillan, Viscount Macmillan of Ovenden (born 1974), British fashion designer

== See also ==
- Daniel McMillan (disambiguation)
