= James Hay (entrepreneur) =

Scottish businessman (born 1950)

- Born: 7 June 1950 (age 75); Glasgow, Scotland
- Education: University of Strathclyde (BSc and PhD)
- Title: Founder and chairman, JMH Group
- Spouse: Fitriani Hay
- Children: 2 daughters

James "Jim" Hay (born 7 June 1950) is a Dubai-based Scottish businessman. He is the chairman of Dubai-based JMH Group, a private family business operating in the construction and luxury goods markets. Hay and his wife Fitriani are racehorse owners and trainers, and significant donors to the Conservative Party.

According to The Sunday Times Rich List in 2019, he is worth £325 million.

== Early life ==
Hay was born in Glasgow. He studied there at the University of Strathclyde, earning a bachelor's degree and PhD in applied chemistry. In 2013 he was welcomed to the ‘Strathclyde Academy of Distinguished Entrepreneurs’ for his work with the JMH Group/Fosroc.

== Career ==
In 1975, Hay joined BP as an engineer and went on to spend 27 years there. He went on to become a senior executive at BP.

In 2002, Hay founded the JMH Group, a private business which in 2014 was reported as having turnover in excess of $600m. He is chairman of JMH Group which includes Fosroc as well as luxury goods brands Ray Ward, Bernard Wetherill (Savile Row men's outfitters) and Fitriani (women's fashion design and retailer).

Hay acquired construction company Fosroc.

== Horse racing ==
In 2006 Hay purchased Uplands, The Lambourn Yard from John and Lavinia Taylor. In 2008 the Hay family were reported to have topped the list of buyers at South Africa’s yearling sales.

In 2011, they purchased a share in Irish Derby and Champion Stakes winner Cape Blanco and four-time Group 1 winner Fame and Glory. Fame and Glory went on to win the 2011 Ascot Gold Cup, on a day when the Hays were invited to join the Queen's Royal procession in open-topped carriages from Windsor Castle.

== Birch Grove ==
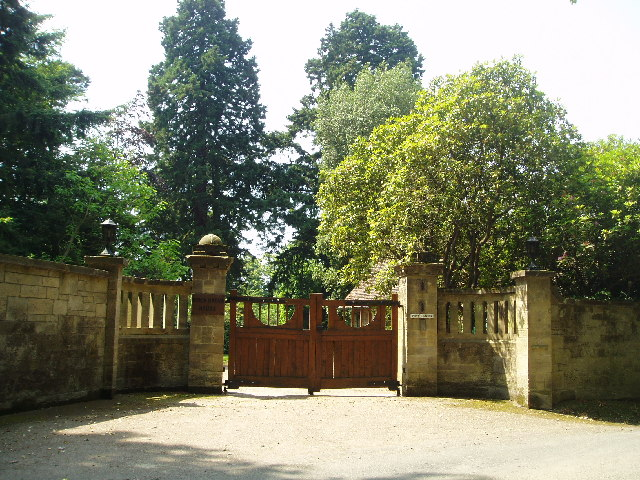
Birch Grove entrance gates

In 2011, Hay and his wife Fitri purchased Birch Grove, the former home of Harold Macmillan in West Sussex. The estate includes a private golf course.

== Personal life ==
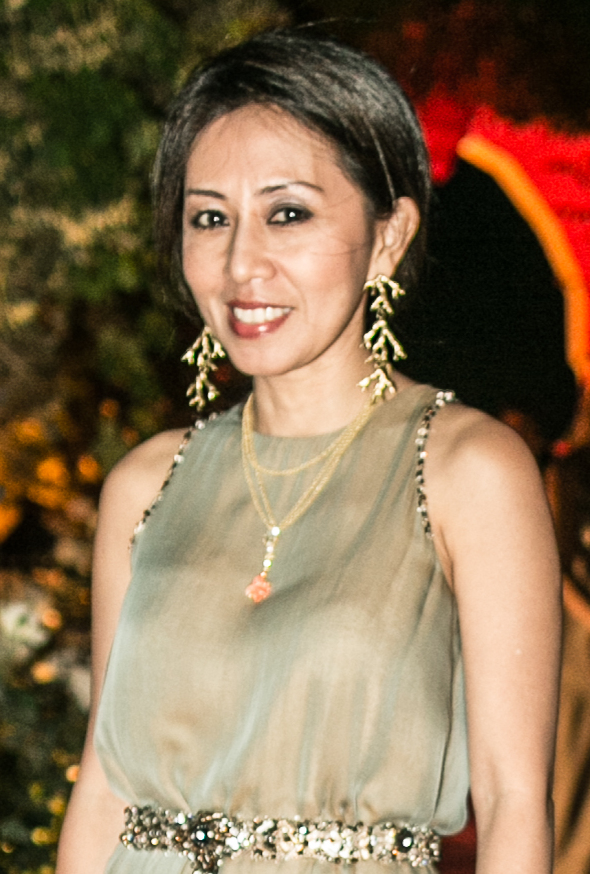
Fitriani Hay at British Polo Day Morocco in 2015

On 25 August 1996, Hay married Fitriani "Fitri". Fitriani was born in Jambi, Sumatra, Indonesia. They live in Dubai, and have two daughters.

In 2015, Fitriani Hay was the second-largest donor to the British Conservative Party, with £66,850. In 2017, she had donated £125,000. In 2022, she was the largest single donor to Liz Truss's leadership campaign, with £100,000.
