= Richard M. Brett =

American conservationist

- Born: September 3, 1903; Darien, Connecticut, US
- Died: September 7, 1989 (aged 86); Hartford, Connecticut, US
- Education: Taft School, Williams College, Yale School of Forestry
- Occupation: Business
- Known for: Conservationist and author
- Spouse(s): Elizabeth Baldwin; Helen Shaw
- Children: Clare and Betsy
- Father: George Platt Brett, Sr.

Richard M. Brett (September 3, 1903 – September 7, 1989) was an American conservationist and author.

== Biography ==
=== Early life ===
Brett was born in Darien, Connecticut and spent most of his life in Woodstock, Vermont, and Fairfield, Connecticut. Brett was a graduate of the Taft School, Williams College, and the Yale School of Forestry.

=== Career ===
Brett served as treasurer (appointed 1926) and general manager of Macmillan Publishing. After serving in World War II, Brett was the business manager of the New York Public Library from 1947 until 1953.

=== Conservationist ===
After retirement in 1953, Brett moved to Vermont, where he set up a tree farm with habitats for wildlife at Hawk's Hill in East Barnard. He served as a trustee of the Vermont Natural Resources Council. Brett later donated his Hawk's Hill tree farm to the New England Forestry Foundation.

=== Military service ===
Brett served in the Army Air Corps during World War II.

== Bibliography ==
- Country Journal Woodlot Primer: The Right Way to Manage Your Woodland by Richard M. Brett (1983)
- Primer on Aging by Richard M. Brett (1988)
- An inquiry into flood plains by Richard M Brett (1973)

== See also ==
- George Edward Brett
- George Platt Brett, Sr.
- George Platt Brett
- Macmillan Publishers (United States)
