= Birch Grove =

Birch Grove House
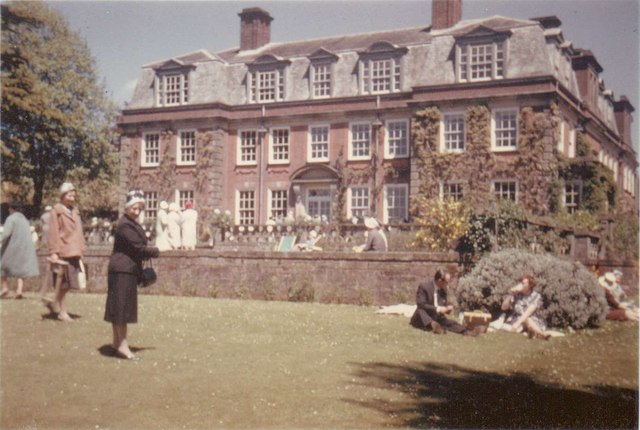
- Photograph of the house from the gardens taken in 1962

- Location within West Sussex
- 51°03′23″N 0°00′38″E
- Type: House
- Location: Horsted Keynes, West Sussex, England

History
- Built: 1926

Site notes
- Architect: Herbert W. Cash (Note: Historic England record the architect as James Cash.)
- Architectural style: Queen Anne Revival
- Owner: James Hay

Listed Building – Grade II
- Official name: Birch Grove House
- Designated: 25 October 1988
- Reference no.: 1372075

Birch Grove, in Horsted Keynes, West Sussex, England, is a country house dating from 1926. It was the family home of Harold Macmillan, the British prime minister from 1957 to 1963, who died there in 1986. During Macmillan's time, Charles de Gaulle, Dwight D. Eisenhower, Nikita Khrushchev, Jawaharlal Nehru and John F. Kennedy stayed as guests at Birch Grove. The house is now owned by the Scottish entrepreneur James Hay. Birch Grove is a Grade II listed building.

== History ==
Maurice Macmillan and his wife Helen (known as Nellie) bought the estate, a large house and just over 100 acres (40 ha) of land, in May 1906 for £13,000. The house was almost completely rebuilt in 1926 at Nellie's insistence. At the same time, Nellie persuaded Maurice to disinherit Harold's two elder brothers and leave the house and estate to Harold, with a life interest for her. Nellie's devotion to, and support for, Harold was an important factor in his subsequent career; Nellie once admonished Harold's children when they were running through Birch Grove; "Don't kick that door. This house is going to belong to the Prime Minister of England one of these days".

Macmillan's diary entry for 7 August 1951 records his return to the house after an absence of over a decade. "The furniture is unpacked and the vast confusion of twelve years (we left it to [a] Nursery School in 1939 and to a preparatory school in 1945) is being sorted out. On the whole the damage is less than I expected...". On Macmillan’s appointment as Secretary of State for Defence in late 1954, he was offered the use of Dorneywood by the prime minister, Winston Churchill. Macmillan declined, and subsequently made little use of Chevening in his time as Foreign Secretary, or Chequers as prime minister. He preferred his own home and "Lady Dorothy doesn't like weeding other people's gardens".

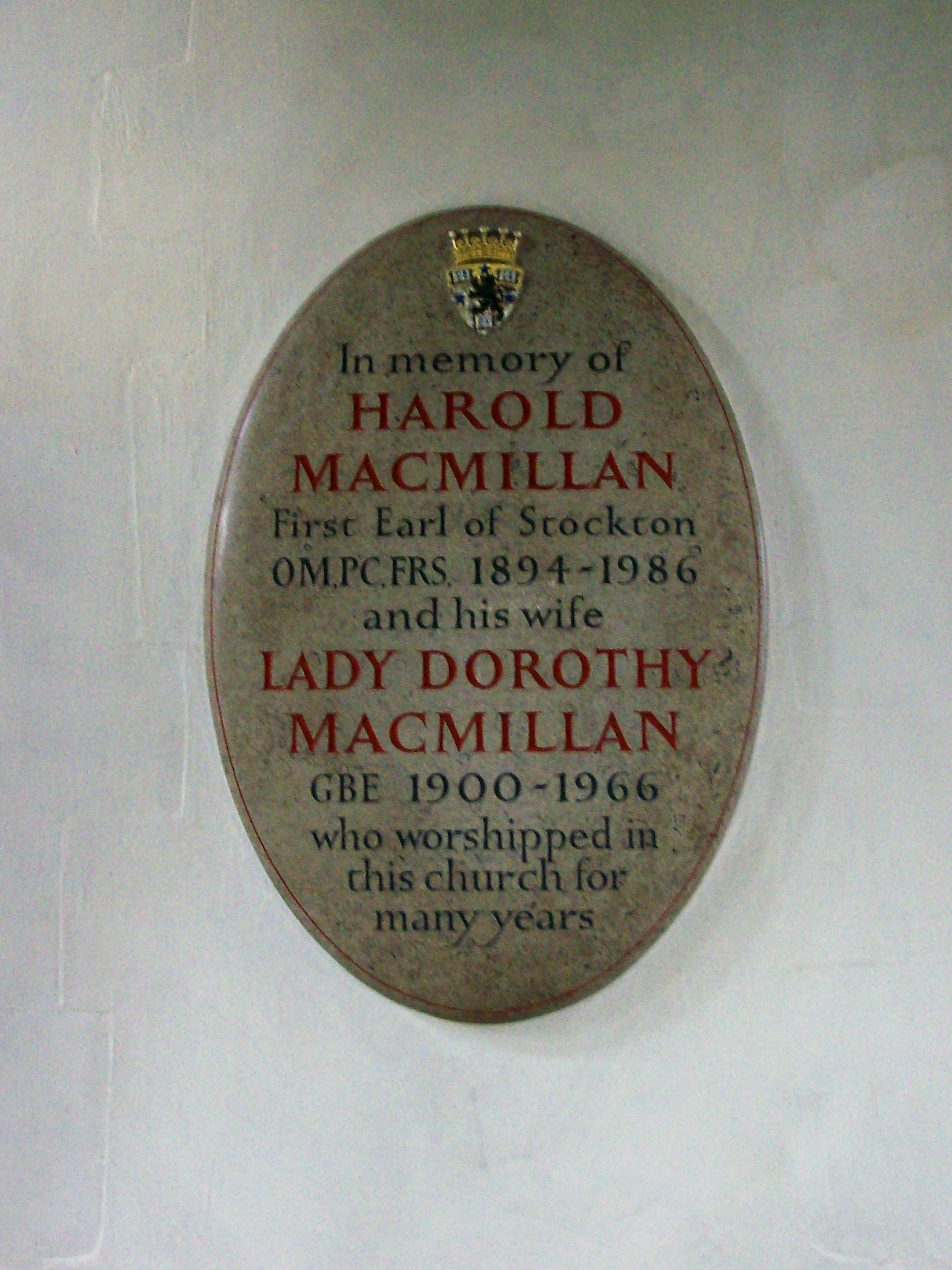
Memorial plaque to Harold and Dorothy Macmillan in the Church of St Giles, Horsted Keynes

Macmillan's diary entry for 25 November 1961 records de Gaulle's visit. "The house is looking lovely. [De Gaulle's] blood plasma is in a special refrigerator in the coach house. Police (with and without dogs) are in the garden and in the woods (one alsatian happily bit the Daily Mail man in the behind). Altogether a most enjoyable show". It was the venue for Macmillan's meeting with John F. Kennedy in June 1963. (Note: Macmillan's note to cabinet read: "The twenty-four hours which the President was at Birchgrove House were... an international meeting of unique character...the British and American governments almost as brothers and partners in a joint undertaking".) Other prominent political visitors to the house during Macmillan's premiership included Dwight D. Eisenhower, Nikita Khrushchev and Jawaharlal Nehru.

Macmillan's diary entry for 30 March 1966 records the eve of the 1966 general election: "Both Heath and Wilson made good final broadcasts - at least, so people say. I have not looked at any T.V. Happily we have not got the instrument at B.G (except in the Servants' Hall)." Family relations at Birch Grove remained somewhat strained after Macmillan's retirement from the premiership in 1963. Macmillan's relationship with his only son, Maurice, was cool, and Dorothy's with Maurice's wife, Katie, was no warmer. Dorothy would demand that visitors to the house lock and bolt all the doors and windows, "otherwise Katie will come for the furniture!"

On 22 May 1966, Dorothy died at the house, after suffering a fatal heart attack in the hall. Twenty years later, on 29 December 1986, Macmillan died at Birch Grove at the age of 92. They are buried in the Macmillan family plot in their local church, St Giles, Horsted Keynes, where a plaque erected by their surviving children records their regular worship.

In 1989, Birch Grove was sold by Macmillan's grandson, Alexander Macmillan, 2nd Earl of Stockton, who had inherited the earldom on his grandfather's death. In 2011 the house was bought for £25 million by the entrepreneur James Hay, having previously been owned by the Chinese businessman Larry Yung.

== Architecture and description ==
Birch Grove stands on the edge of the Ashdown Forest near Chelwood Gate in East Sussex, although the house itself is in West Sussex. It is a Grade II listed building, although the Historic England listing record makes clear that this is for its historical associations rather than any intrinsic architectural merit. Pevsner Architectural Guides is no more admiring of the house, describing it as " an unhappy union between Queen Anne and a mansard [roof] that weighs the house down". Macmillan's official biographer, Alistair Horne, notes that Nellie's rebuilding of Birch Grove was "one of only two or three such major works of residential construction undertaken during the depression". The house is built to a square plan, with four ranges each of nine bays around a central courtyard. Pevsner suggests that some of the interior fittings may have come from Devonshire House in London, which had been sold by Dorothy's father, the 9th Duke of Devonshire, in 1920 and demolished shortly thereafter. (Note: Historic England supports this view, noting the presence of "genuine early 18th century doorcases and chimney-pieces".) Simon Ball, in his study of Macmillan and three of his contemporaries, The Guardsmen, describes Birch Grove as "substantial if inelegant".

== Sources ==
- Ball, Simon (2004). The Guardsmen: Harold Macmillan, Three Friends, and the World They Made. London: Harper Collins. ISBN 978-0-0065-3163-0. OCLC 1074163021.
- Coppin, Paul (2006). 101 Medieval Churches of West Sussex. Seaford: S.B. Publications. ISBN 1-85770-306-5.
- Horne, Alistair (1988). Macmillan Volume I: 1894–1956 (Original ed.). London: Macmillan. ISBN 978-0-333-27691-4.
- Horne, Alistair (1989). Macmillan Volume II: 1957–1986 (Original ed.). London: Macmillan. ISBN 978-0-333-49621-3.
- Lamb, Richard (1995). The Macmillan Years 1957–63: The Emerging Truth. London: Murray. ISBN 978-0-719-55392-9.
- Macmillan, Harold (2004). Peter Catterall (ed.). The Macmillan Diaries: The Cabinet Years 1950-1957. Vol. 1 (Paperback ed.). London: Pan Macmillan. ISBN 9780330488686. OCLC 249707898.
- Macmillan, Harold (2004). Peter Catterall (ed.). The Macmillan Diaries: Prime Minister and After 1957-1966. Vol. 2 (Paperback ed.). London: Pan Macmillan. ISBN 9781405047210. OCLC 1015487300.
- Thorpe, D. R. (2010). Supermac: The Life of Harold Macmillan. London: Chatto & Windus. ISBN 978-1-844-13541-7.
- Williams, Charles (2009). Harold Macmillan. London: Weidenfeld & Nicolson. ISBN 978-0-753-82702-4.
- Williamson, Elizabeth; Hudson, Tim; Musson, Jeremy; Nairn, Ian (2019). Sussex: West. The Buildings of England. New Haven, US and London: Yale University Press. ISBN 978-0-300-22521-1.
