= Lady Dorothy Macmillan =

English socialite (1900–1966)

Lady Dorothy Macmillan GBE
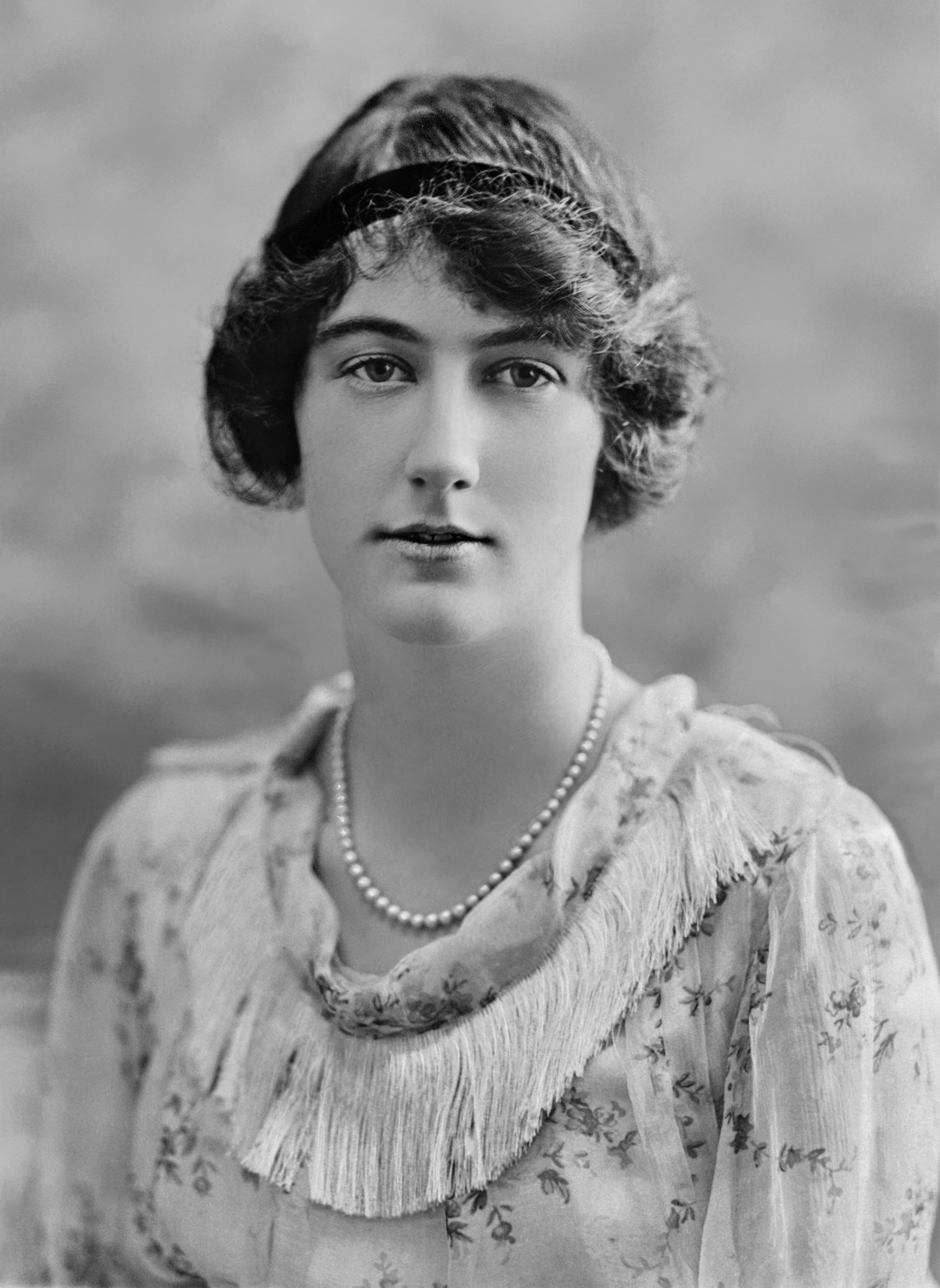
- Lady Dorothy in 1920
- Born: Dorothy Evelyn Cavendish; 28 July 1900; London, England
- Died: 21 May 1966 (aged 65); Birch Grove, East Sussex, England
- Known for: Spouse of the prime minister of the United Kingdom (1957–1963)
- Spouse: Harold Macmillan (m. 1920)
- Children: 4, including Maurice and Caroline
- Parents: Victor Cavendish, 9th Duke of Devonshire (father); Lady Evelyn Petty-Fitzmaurice (mother)

Lady Dorothy Evelyn Macmillan GBE (née Cavendish; 28 July 1900 – 21 May 1966) was an English socialite and the third daughter of Victor Cavendish, 9th Duke of Devonshire, and Evelyn Cavendish, Duchess of Devonshire. She was the spouse of the prime minister of the United Kingdom between 1957 and 1963, as the wife of Harold Macmillan.

== Family life ==
She spent her first eight years at Holker Hall, Lancashire (located in the county of Cumbria post-1974); and Lismore Castle, Ireland. She became known as Lady Dorothy from the age of eight, when her father succeeded to the dukedom of Devonshire, and the family moved into Chatsworth House, Derbyshire, and the other ducal estates. She received lessons in French, German, riding and golf. From the age of sixteen she lived with the family at Rideau Hall, Ottawa, where her father served as Governor General of Canada.

=== Marriage ===
In 1920 she married publisher and Conservative politician Harold Macmillan, who had been on her father's staff in Canada. Their lavish wedding, on 21 April at St Margaret's, Westminster, was attended by royalty, aristocracy and leading literary figures, and was hailed as the social event of the London season.

Lady Dorothy was a dutiful political wife and the couple remained married and publicly together (despite her long-lasting affair with Conservative politician Robert Boothby) until her death from a heart attack at the Macmillan family estate at Birch Grove, West Sussex, in 1966. Her husband, who was created Earl of Stockton in 1984, outlived her by 20 years.

She and Harold had four children:

- Maurice Macmillan, Viscount Macmillan of Ovenden (1921–1984). Conservative politician and publisher. Married The Hon Katharine Ormsby-Gore, daughter of the 4th Baron Harlech. His father outlived him by nearly three years.
- Lady Caroline Macmillan (1923–2016). Married Julian Faber; five children.
- Lady Catherine Macmillan (1926–1991). Married Julian Amery (later Baron Amery of Lustleigh), Conservative politician; four children.
- Sarah Macmillan (1930–1970). Married Andrew Heath in 1953; two children. Having had an abortion in 1951, she was unable to have children of her own and the couple adopted two sons. She had an unhappy life, which was blighted by a drinking problem, and died aged 40, her father outliving her by 16 years.

In 1929 Lady Dorothy began a lifelong affair with the Conservative politician Robert Boothby, an arrangement that scandalised high society but remained unknown to the general public. Philip Frere, a partner in Frere Cholmely solicitors, urged Macmillan not to divorce his wife, which at that time would have been fatal to a public career even for the "innocent party". Macmillan and Lady Dorothy lived largely separate lives in private thereafter. The stress caused by this may have contributed to Macmillan's nervous breakdown in 1931. He was often treated with condescension by his aristocratic in-laws and was observed to be a sad and isolated figure at Chatsworth in the 1930s. Campbell suggests that Macmillan's humiliation was first a major cause of his odd and rebellious behaviour in the 1930s then, in subsequent decades, made him a harder and more ruthless politician than his rivals Eden and Butler.

== Notes ==
Unofficial roles
Preceded by Clarissa Eden	Spouse of the Prime Minister of the United Kingdom; 1957–1963	Succeeded by Elizabeth Douglas-Home
