= Beatrice Ormsby-Gore, Baroness Harlech =

British aristocrat (1891–1980)

The Right Honourable The Lady Harlech DCVO
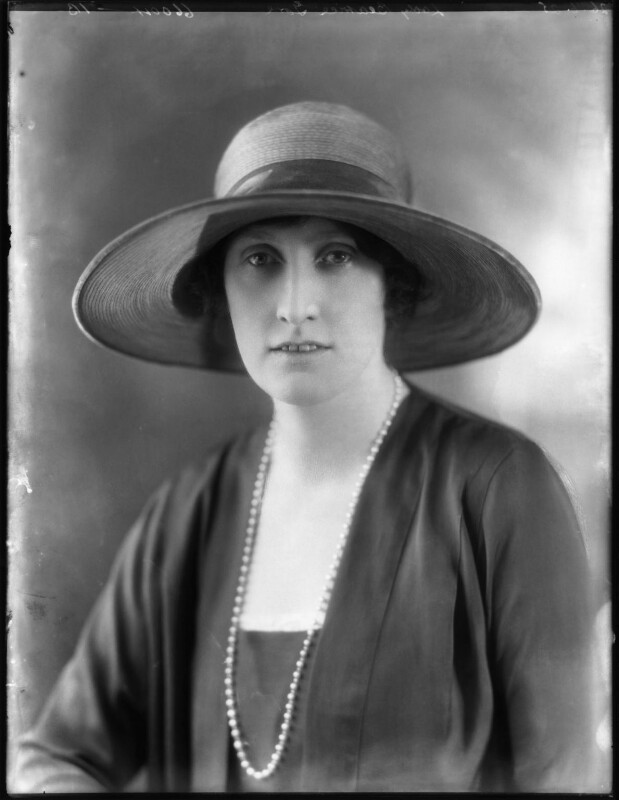
- Lady Harlech in 1925
- Born: 10 August 1891
- Died: 3 December 1980 (aged 89); Ladbroke Grove, London, England
- Spouse: William Ormsby-Gore (m. 1913; died 1964)
- Children: 6, including William and Katherine
- Parents: James Gascoyne-Cecil, 4th Marquess of Salisbury (father); Lady Cicely Alice Gore (mother)
- Relatives: 5th Earl of Arran (maternal grandfather)

Beatrice Edith Mildred Ormsby-Gore, Baroness Harlech DCVO (née Gascoyne-Cecil; 10 August 1891 – 3 December 1980) was an English courtier who served as Woman of the Bedchamber to Elizabeth Bowes-Lyon, Queen of the United Kingdom.

Lady Beatrice was born in London, the daughter of Viscount Cranborne, later the Marquess of Salisbury, and his wife, Lady Cicely Alice Gore, daughter of the 5th Earl of Arran.

She married William Ormsby-Gore, 4th Baron Harlech at Westminster Abbey on 12 April 1913.

She was created Dame Commander of the Royal Victorian Order in the 1947 Birthday Honours.

Lady Harlech died at her home in Ladbroke Grove, London, aged 89.
