= Daniel McMillan =

Daniel McMillan may refer to:

- Daniel Hunter McMillan (1846–1933), Manitoba politician
- Daniel H. McMillan (American politician) (1846–1908), New York State Senator and New Mexico Territorial Supreme Court
- Dan McMillan (1898–1975), American football player
- Daniel McMillan (handballer) (born 1982), British handball player

== See also ==
- Daniel Macmillan (disambiguation)
