= Alexander Macmillan, 2nd Earl of Stockton =

British politician (born 1943)

The Right Honourable The Earl of Stockton
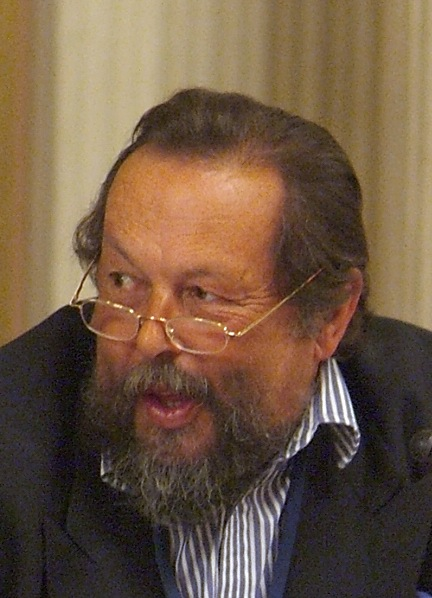
- Stockton in 2005

Member of the European Parliament
- In office 10 July 1999 – 10 July 2004
- Preceded by: Constituency created
- Succeeded by: Roger Knapman
- Constituency: South West England

Member of the House of Lords
- Lord Temporal
- Hereditary peerage 29 December 1986 – 11 November 1999
- Preceded by: Harold Macmillan
- Succeeded by: Seat abolished (Note: Pursuant to the House of Lords Act 1999.)

Personal details
- Born: Alexander Daniel Alan Macmillan; 10 October 1943 (age 83) Oswestry, Shropshire, England
- Party: Conservative
- Spouses: Birgitte Hamilton (m. 1970; div. 1991) Miranda Quarry (m. 1995; div. 2011)
- Children: Daniel Macmillan, Viscount Macmillan of Ovenden; Lady Rebecca Macmillan; Lady Louisa Macmillan
- Parents: Maurice Macmilllan, Viscount Macmillan of Ovenden; Katharine Ormsby-Gore

Alexander Daniel Alan Macmillan, 2nd Earl of Stockton (born 10 October 1943), styled as Viscount Macmillan of Ovenden between 1984 and 1986, is a British Conservative Party politician, Hereditary Peer and former Member of the European Parliament.

== Early life and education ==
Stockton was born in 1943 in Oswestry, Shropshire, the eldest son of Conservative politician Maurice Macmillan, Viscount Macmillan of Ovenden, and his wife the Hon. Katharine Ormsby-Gore, daughter of William Ormsby-Gore, 4th Baron Harlech. His paternal grandfather was prime minister Harold Macmillan, 1st Earl of Stockton. His mother was a great-granddaughter of prime minister Robert Gascoyne-Cecil, 3rd Marquess of Salisbury.

Stockton was educated at Eton College, the University of Paris and at Strathclyde University.

== Career ==
Stockton's grandfather, Harold Macmillan, 1st Earl of Stockton, who had served as Prime Minister of the United Kingdom from 1957 to 1963, unexpectedly accepted a peerage in February 1984, at the age of ninety. His son Maurice Macmillan died three weeks later, making Stockton the heir to the new earldom, and he succeeded as a member of the House of Lords on his grandfather's death at the end of 1986. However, he is not recorded as having spoken in any debates there, and was one of the hereditary peers who lost their seats as a result of the House of Lords Act 1999. Having been beaten at Bristol in 1994, he went on to be elected as a Conservative member of the European Parliament for South West England from 1999 to 2004.

Stockton has been an unsuccessful candidate sixteen times in the by-elections held among hereditary peers for a seat in the House of Lords, as of 2019. Most notably, in 2007 he came third in a contest to replace Lord Mowbray, behind the winner, Lord Cathcart, and Lord Younger of Leckie; in the 2010 by-election to replace Lord Northesk, he came second behind Lord Younger of Leckie; in 2011 he lost to Lord Hanworth in a ballot for the seat of the deceased Lord Strabolgi; and in 2014 he lost out to the Earl of Oxford and Asquith.

At the May 2011 local council elections, Stockton was elected as a Conservative councillor of South Bucks district council and represented the Denham South ward for four years, but did not stand at the 2015 local elections.

Both his father Maurice Macmillan (1921–1984) and his grandfather preceded him as chairmen of Macmillan Publishers Ltd., the publishing house long owned by the family. Stockton sold it to the German Holtzbrinck group. He ranked 253rd in the Sunday Times 2004 Rich List, with an estimated wealth of £165m.

Stockton renovated Hayne Manor with his second wife in Devon and listed it for sale.

On 29 April 2002, Stockton appeared alongside several other relatives of deceased former prime ministers, as well as then-prime minister Tony Blair and the four surviving former prime ministers at the time (Edward Heath, James Callaghan, Margaret Thatcher and John Major), for a dinner at Downing Street which formed part of the celebrations for the Golden Jubilee of Elizabeth II.

Stockton is vice president of the Royal Crescent Society, Bath.

== Personal life ==
Stockton married Hélène Birgitte Hamilton in 1970; they divorced 1991. There were three children from this marriage:

- Daniel Maurice Alan Macmillan, Viscount Macmillan of Ovenden (b. 9 October 1974)
- Lady Rebecca Elizabeth Macmillan (b. 1980)
- Lady Louisa Alexandra Macmillan (b. 1982)

On 23 December 1995, Stockton married Miranda Quarry (1947–2020), who had been the third wife of actor Peter Sellers. Stockton and Quarry were divorced 2011. This union produced no children.

Stockton lives in Denham, Buckinghamshire. In August 2022, Stockton was banned from driving for 13 months after pleading guilty to a drink driving charge. After driving home from an event on 31 July, where he had drunk some wine, he swerved his Range Rover into parked cars, causing minor damage to the vehicles. He was fined £7,616, and told to pay costs of £2,085. The large fine was given due to his high income.

== Arms ==
Coat of arms of Alexander Macmillan, 2nd Earl of Stockton
Crest Upon a helm with a wreath or azure and sable within sprigs of oak fructed or a dexter cubit arm and a sinister arm embowed both proper the dexter hand gauntletted or and with the other brandishing a two handed sword proper hilt pommel and quillons sable. Escutcheon Argent a chief or overall between three open books proper edged or and bound azure those in chief inscribed respectively in letters sable ` Miseres’ and ` Discere’ and that in base also in letters sable inscribed ` Succo’ and as many mullets azure a lion rampant sable. Supporters Dexter, a lion rampant gules; Sinister, an American bald headed eagle proper the compartment comprising a crenelated wall proper in the portal thereof an anchor azure and joined on either side by two bars wavy azure to a grassy mount growing from that on the dexter a long branch and from that on the sinister a thistle both proper.

== Notes ==
Peerage of the United Kingdom
Preceded by Harold Macmillan	Earl of Stockton; 1986–present Member of the House of Lords (1986–1999)	Incumbent; Heir apparent: Daniel Macmillan, Viscount Macmillan of Ovenden
Orders of precedence in the United Kingdom
Preceded by The Earl of Woolton	as a Peer of the Realm; The Earl of Stockton	Followed by Lord Nicholas Windsor
