= Henry Edger =

English positivist

Henry Edger (22 January 1820, Chelwood Gate – April 1888, Paris) was an English positivist active in the nineteenth century. He was one of Auguste Comte's ten disciples.

After studying Law in London Edger married Millicent Hobson. Although originally a protestant, he abandoned Christianity in favour of communism. He moved with his family to New York City in 1851. Over the next three years two things caught his interest, Positivism and the Socialist Community of Modern Times an anarchist intentional community based on Long Island, New York State. On 9 April 1854 he decided to commit his life to the propagation of the "positivist faith" consecrating his life to "laying the foundation stone" to the Comtean edifice in the New World. Although originally attracted to the Fourierist community in Red Bank, New Jersey, he stayed there for only a few months. He eventually moved to Modern Times in 1854 for the purposes of spreading positivism. He built an oratory with a steeple attached to his log cabin, and conducted the Comtean religious rites. He further organised a glee club and an orchestra. However aside from his friends John Metcalf and Charles Codman, his efforts to spread positivism had little impact outside his family.

He also started a long series of correspondence with Comte which continued until the latter's death in 1857.

Although his attempts to spread positivism amongst the inhabitants of Modern Times met with little success, and indeed encountered the hostility of its founder Josiah Warren, it nevertheless provided a base from which Edger could promote Positivism further afield. With his convert, John Metcalf, he provided a range of Positivist reading material available by mail including Modern Times, the Labor question, and the Family which he written himself.

In 1880 Edger left Modern Times and moved to Paris, where he died in 1888.
