= William Ormsby-Gore, 4th Baron Harlech =

British peer and politician (1885–1964)

The Right Honourable The Lord Harlech KG GCMG PC
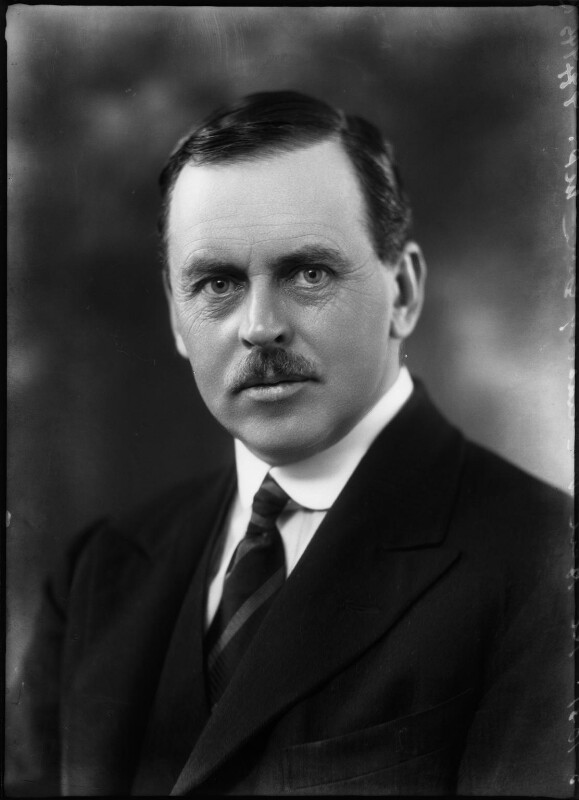
- Ormsby-Gore in 1931

Secretary of State for the Colonies
- In office 28 May 1936 – 16 May 1938
- Monarchs: Edward VIII; George VI
- Prime Minister: Stanley Baldwin
- Preceded by: J. H. Thomas
- Succeeded by: Malcolm MacDonald

Member of the House of Lords Lord Temporal
- In office 1938 – 14 February 1964 as a hereditary peer
- Preceded by: The 3rd Baron Harlech
- Succeeded by: The 5th Baron Harlech

Personal details
- Born: 11 April 1885
- Died: 14 February 1964 (aged 78)
- Party: Conservative
- Spouse: Lady Beatrice Gascoyne-Cecil (m. 1913)
- Children: 6, including William and Katherine
- Parent: George Ormsby-Gore, 3rd Baron Harlech (father)

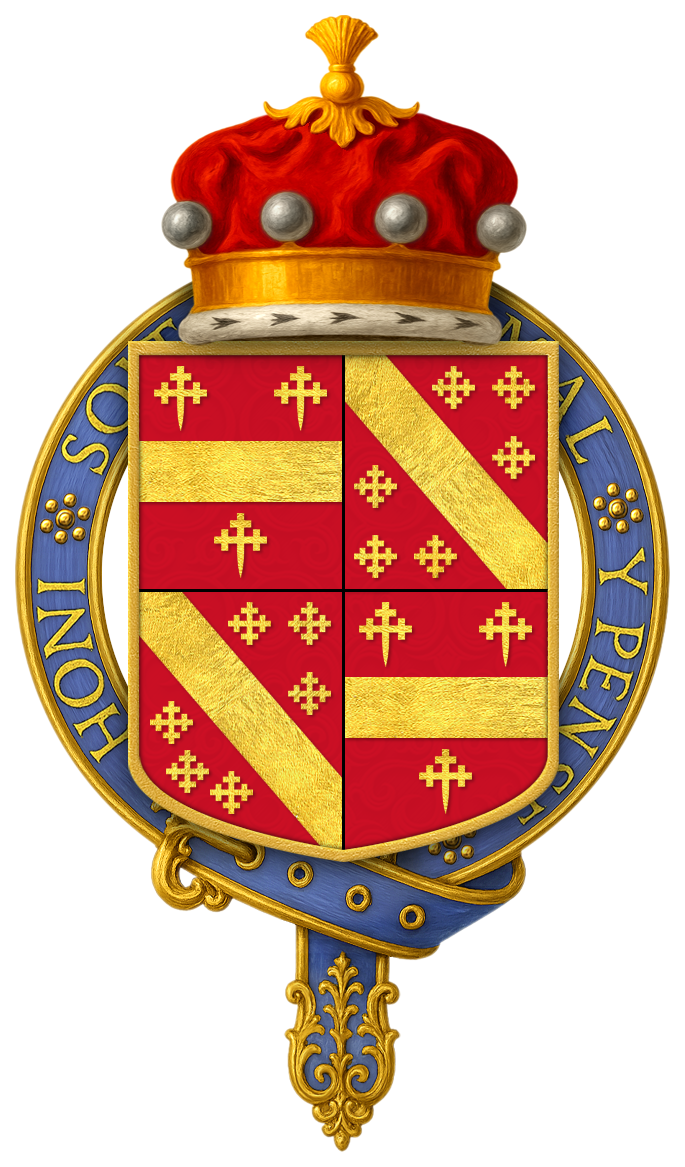
Garter-encircled shield of arms of William Ormsby-Gore, 4th Baron Harlech, KG, GCMG, PC

William George Arthur Ormsby-Gore, 4th Baron Harlech (11 April 1885 – 14 February 1964), was a British Conservative politician and banker.

== Background ==
Harlech, the son of George Ormsby-Gore, 3rd Baron Harlech, and Lady Margaret Gordon, daughter of Charles Gordon, 10th Marquess of Huntly, was born at Eaton Square, London. He was educated at Eton College and New College, Oxford.

== Military service and First World War ==
Ormsby-Gore served in the Territorial Army, being commissioned a second lieutenant in the Shropshire Yeomanry in 1907 and promoted lieutenant in 1911.

He was mobilized at the outbreak of the First World War and accompanied his regiment to Egypt, where he was promoted captain in 1915 and went onto the general staff. In 1916 he joined the Arab Bureau as an intelligence officer, attached to the British High Commissioner Sir Henry A. McMahon.

He strongly opposed the secret Sykes-Picot Treaty, arguing "we make professions of defending and helping small & oppressed nations... [yet] we parcel out between our allies & ourselves vast tracts of countries which do not want us." He argued that Britain should support self-determination for Arabs and Jews. He challenged claims that Africans were incapable of governing themselves. He saw white prejudices as the fundamental problem, not the incapability of non-whites. As an MP, Ormsby-Gore pressured the British government to accept a League of Nations mandates system.

He was recalled to England in 1917 to serve as Parliamentary Private Secretary to Lord Milner and as assistant secretary in the War Cabinet headed by Prime Minister David Lloyd George, and to Sir Mark Sykes. Zionist leader Chaim Weizmann, a personal friend, took refuge in Ormsby-Gore's London home while the former was in the capital for the cabinet approval of the Balfour Declaration. With Weizmann's approval, Ormsby-Gore was the British military liaison officer with the Zionist mission in the Holy Land (then lately liberated from Ottoman Turkish rule) during March to August 1918. After the armistice, he was part of the British delegation to the peace conference at Paris in 1919.

Ormsby-Gore remained serving in the yeomanry after the war until 1921. In 1939 he was appointed an honorary colonel of the 10th Battalion of the Royal Welch Fusiliers.

== Political career ==
Harlech was elected as Member of Parliament (MP) for Denbigh Boroughs by a majority of eight votes at the January 1910 general election, sitting for the seat until he was selected for and won Stafford at the 1918 general election. He sat in the House of Commons until he entered the House of Lords on succeeding to his father's peerage in 1938 as the 4th Baron Harlech.

He was British representative to the Permanent Mandates Commission of the League of Nations from 1921 to 1922. He played a catalyst role in expanding the powers of the Commission and making colonial powers accountable to the Commission. He was influential in establishing a process whereby subjects in the mandates could petition the League of Nations and have their grievances publicized.

He served as Under-Secretary of State for the Colonies from 1922 to 1929 (with a brief interruption during the short-lived Labour government of 1924).

In the 1927 New Year Honours, he was sworn of the Privy Council. Harlech also held office in the National Government as Postmaster-General in 1931, as First Commissioner of Works from 1931 to 1936 and as Colonial Secretary between 1936 and 1938, resigning, eight days after he entered the House of Lords, as protest of support of partitioning Palestine after pressure of Arab protests over Jewish immigration. After his resignation, he was appointed as Knight Grand Cross of the Order of St Michael and St George (GCMG) in the 1938 Birthday Honours. He was also a firm protester against Nazi Germany at that time.

During the Second World War, he was Civil Defence Commissioner for the North-East of England and then High Commissioner to South Africa from 1941 to 1944.

== Cultural interests ==
He had an extensive library at his Shropshire home, Brogyntyn near Oswestry, which he downsized after moving out of the mansion in 1955. He and his father deposited a valuable collection of Brogyntyn manuscripts at the National Library of Wales.

He was author of:

- Florentine Sculptors of the Fifteenth Century (1930)
- Guide to the Mantegna Cartoons at Hampton Court (1935)
- Three volumes in the series Guides to the Ancient Monuments of England.

=== Further work ===
After retiring from politics he served on the board of Midland Bank, owner of a banking house founded by his family, and was chairman of the Bank of West Africa. He also held the honorary post of Lord Lieutenant of Merionethshire between 1938 and 1957. On 12 March 1948 he was appointed as Knight Companion of the Order of the Garter (KG).

Described as having "a deep interest in the arts", Lord Harlech was trustee of the National Gallery (with brief interval) from 1927, and of the Tate Gallery from 1945 to 1953, chairman of the advisory committee to the Victoria and Albert Museum and of the Standing Commission on Museums and Galleries from 1948 to 1956. He was the President of the national Library of Wales, 1950–58. He was Pro-Chancellor of the University of Wales and Constable of Harlech and Caernarfon castles.

In 1952 he donated five and a half acres of land on the Brogyntyn estate to the corporation of Oswestry, to become the present public Brogyntyn Park.

== Personal life ==
Lord Harlech married Lady Beatrice Edith Mildred Gascoyne-Cecil (born 10 August 1891, died 1980), daughter of James Gascoyne-Cecil, 4th Marquess of Salisbury, in 1913. They had six children:

- Mary Hermione Ormsby-Gore (born 7 September 1914, died 26 September 2006), married firstly Captain Robin Francis Campbell in 1936 (divorced 1946) and secondly in 1947 Sir Alexander Lees Mayall, KCVO, CMG.
- Owen Gerard Cecil Ormsby-Gore (born 30 July 1916, died 3 October 1935)
- William David Ormsby-Gore, 5th Baron Harlech (born 20 May 1918, died 26 January 1985)
- Katherine Margaret Alice Ormsby-Gore, DBE (born 4 January 1921, died 22 January 2017), married Maurice Macmillan, Viscount Macmillan of Ovenden, son of Harold Macmillan, 1st Earl of Stockton and Lady Dorothy Cavendish.
- Captain John Julian Stafford Ormsby-Gore (born 12 April 1925, died 18 April 2008), unmarried.
- Elizabeth Jane Ormsby-Gore (born 14 November 1929, died 19 January 2004), married William Simon Pease, 3rd Baron Wardington.

Lord Harlech died in February 1964, aged 78, and was succeeded in the barony by his second, but eldest surviving son David, who followed him into politics and served as British Ambassador to the United States in the 1960s. Beatrice, Lady Harlech, a Lady of the Bedchamber to Queen Elizabeth, died in 1980.

== Coat of arms ==
Coat of arms of William Ormsby-Gore, 4th Baron Harlech

Notes
Coat of arms of the Ormsby-Gore family
Coronet
A coronet of a Baron
Crest
1st: an Heraldic Tiger rampant Argent; 2nd: a Dexter Arm embowed in armour proper holding in the hand a Man's Leg also in armour couped at the thigh
Escutcheon
Quarterly: 1st and 4th, Gules a Fess between three Cross Crosslets fitchy Or (Gore); 2nd and 3rd, Gules a Bend between six Cross Crosslets Or (Ormsby)
Supporters
Dexter: an Heraldic Tiger Argent maned and tufted Sable ducally gorged Or; Sinister: a Lion Or
Motto
In Hoc Signo Vinces (Under this sign thou shalt conquer)

== Notes ==
Parliament of the United Kingdom
Preceded by Clement Edwards	Member of Parliament for Denbigh Boroughs; January 1910 – 1918	Succeeded by Sir David Davies
Preceded by Sir Walter Essex	Member of Parliament for Stafford; 1918–1938	Succeeded by Peter Thorneycroft
Political offices
Preceded by E. F. L. Wood	Under-Secretary of State for the Colonies; 1922–1924	Succeeded by The Lord Arnold
Preceded by The Lord Arnold	Under-Secretary of State for the Colonies; 1924–1929	Succeeded by William Lunn
Preceded by Clement Attlee	Postmaster General; 1931	Succeeded by Sir Kingsley Wood
Preceded by The Marquess of Londonderry	First Commissioner of Works; 1931–1936	Succeeded by The Earl Stanhope
Preceded by J. H. Thomas	Secretary of State for the Colonies; 1936–1938	Succeeded by Malcolm MacDonald
Diplomatic posts
Preceded by Edward John Harding	High Commissioner to South Africa; 1941–1944	Succeeded by Evelyn Baring
Honorary titles
Preceded by The Lord Harlech	Lord Lieutenant of Merionethshire; 1938–1957	Succeeded by John Francis Williams-Wynne
Peerage of the United Kingdom
Preceded by George Ormsby-Gore	Baron Harlech; 1938–1964; Member of the House of Lords (1938–1964)	Succeeded by David Ormsby-Gore
