= Chelwood Gate =

Village in East Sussex, England

Coordinates: 51.048°N 0.024°E

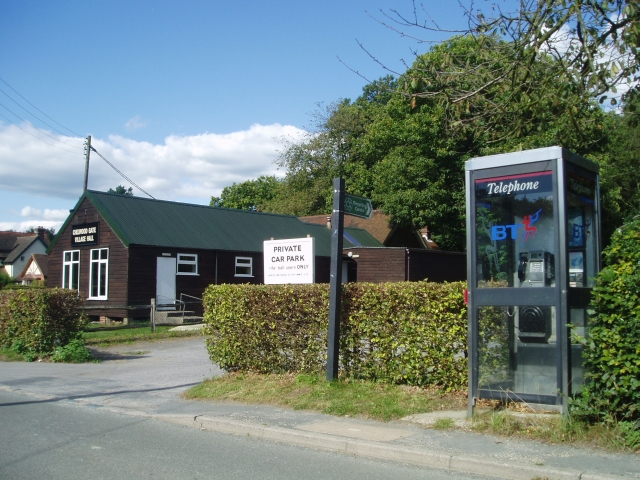
- The village hall

- Location within East Sussex
- OS grid reference: TQ4159629872
- Civil parish: Danehill
- District: Wealden
- Shire county: East Sussex
- Region: South East
- Country: England
- Sovereign state: United Kingdom
- Post town: HAYWARDS HEATH
- Postcode district: RH17
- Dialling code: 01825
- Police: Sussex
- Fire: East Sussex
- Ambulance: South East Coast
- UK Parliament: East Grinstead and Uckfield

Chelwood Gate is a small village within the civil parish of Danehill in the Wealden district of East Sussex, England. Its nearest town is Uckfield, which lies approximately 6.6 miles (10.6 km) south-east from the village, just off the A22 road. The village is near the West Sussex border.

Chelwood Gate was one of the entrances into Ashdown Forest through which John of Gaunt, the third surviving son of King Edward III, would have entered the forest from his hunting lodge. There is an Iron Age enclosure which is a Scheduled Monument due to its importance as a relatively rare example of a Wealden Iron Age settlement.

The village church forms part of the Parish of All Saints Danehill with Chelwood Gate. The church was built as a 'chapel of ease' not long after the main parish building in Danehill was completed so that the residents local to Chelwood Gate would not have to travel the longer journey on foot to the church at Danehill.

Behind the church, a single bell is hung in a timber bellcote. In 2006, the church was expanded to accommodate a toilet and kitchen. In the same year, The Whitechapel Bell Foundry supplied a bell tuned to the key of F. It measures 13.81 in (351 mm) in diameter, and is chimed by a rope. The rope itself has a block just above the hole in the floor to prevent it from being swung too high. In the past, it appears that it did hit, due to a dent on the side of the louvres. It is inscribed: 20 (Fig. WBF,1) 06 / WHITECHAPEL in small block-Roman capitals. The partials are:
Hum – 698 Hz
Prime – 1397 Hz
Tierce – 1664.5 Hz
Nominal – 2698.5 Hz

The bell can be heard online.

The village public house, the Red Lion, was built in the 19th century and was patronised in the past by Harold Macmillan and United States President John F Kennedy. Kennedy came to visit the then Prime Minister, Harold Macmillan, in 1963 and a memorial to this event can be found on the Wych Cross road within the village. The village also has a village hall which is visited by a mobile library service, a village market and there is also a nursery school.

The Cats Protection National Cat Centre is located in Chelwood Gate.

== Notable people ==
- Henry Edger (1820–1888) was born here.
- Harold Macmillan, prime minister of the United Kingdom from 1957 to 1963, was living in the village at the time of his death in December 1986 at the age of 92. Birch Grove, the Macmillan family home, was started in 1923 and completed in 1926 by Harold's father – who was the head of the Macmillan family publishing firm.
- Robert Cecil, 1st Viscount Cecil of Chelmwood
