= Fosroc =

British construction chemicals company

Fosroc International Ltd.
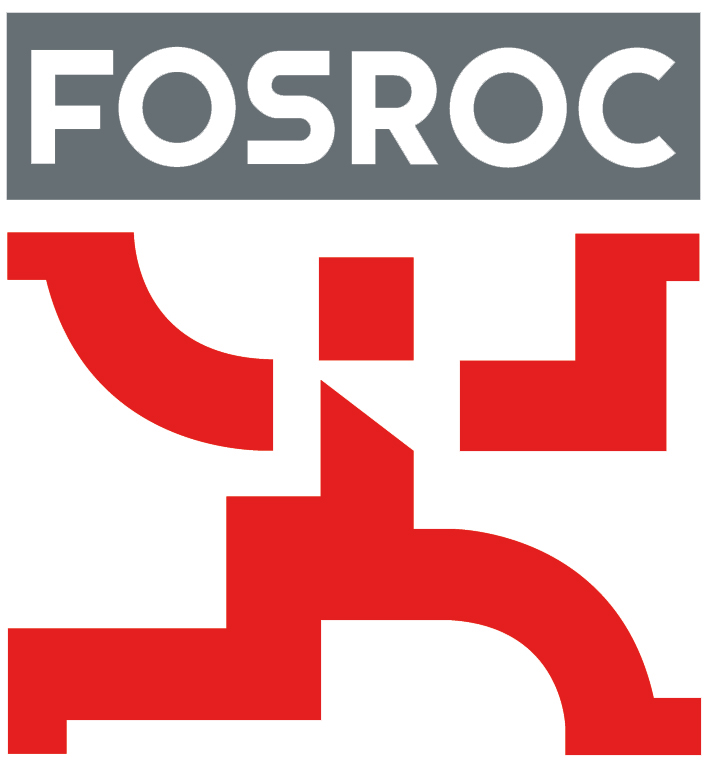
- Formerly: Fosroc Holdings U.K. Ltd; Fosroc Expandite Limited
- Company type: Subsidiary
- Industry: Construction chemicals
- Founded: 1972; 53 years ago
- Headquarters: Dubai, UAE
- Number of locations: 25
- Products: Concrete Repair, Structural Strengthening, Joint Sealants, Adhesives, Waterproofing, Protective Coatings, Concrete Admixtures, Industrial Flooring, Grouts and Anchors
- Brands: Renderoc, Nitomortar, Nitowrap, Nitoplate, Nitorod, Nitoseal, Thioflex, Colpor, Nitotile, Nitobond, Supercast, Proofex, Torchseal, Nitocote, Dekguard, Conplast, Structuro, Auramix, Nitoflor, Trafficguard, Conbextra and Lokfix
- Number of employees: Approx. 3,000 (2023)
- Parent: Saint-Gobain
- Website: www.fosroc.com

Fosroc is a British manufacturer of specialised construction chemicals that cater to a range of sectors including commercial, industrial, residential, marine and infrastructure.

Employing around 3000 employees worldwide and with offices and locations across Europe, the Middle East and Asia Pacific, they are further represented in other regions around the world through a distributor and licensee network.

In 2024, Saint-Gobain announced the acquisition of the company to strengthen its global position in construction chemicals. Valued at 11.3x Fosroc’s estimated 2024 EBITDA, the deal was expected to be completed in the first half of the year following the announcement.

On February 2, 2025, Saint-Gobain completed the purchase of Fosroc.

== Notable projects ==
=== Burj Al Arab ===
Location: Dubai, UAE

Al Gurg Fosroc was required to work hand in hand with the contractors and other project consultants to identify the best product combinations that would provide optimal performance in difficult circumstances. The Burj Al Arab is the world's tallest hotel, constructed on a man-made island, surrounded by a seawater environment. Amongst a myriad of construction challenges, careful consideration needed to be given in the selection of concrete admixtures and products to provide waterproofing and pile heads.
