= George Platt Brett Sr. =

British-born publisher of Jack London

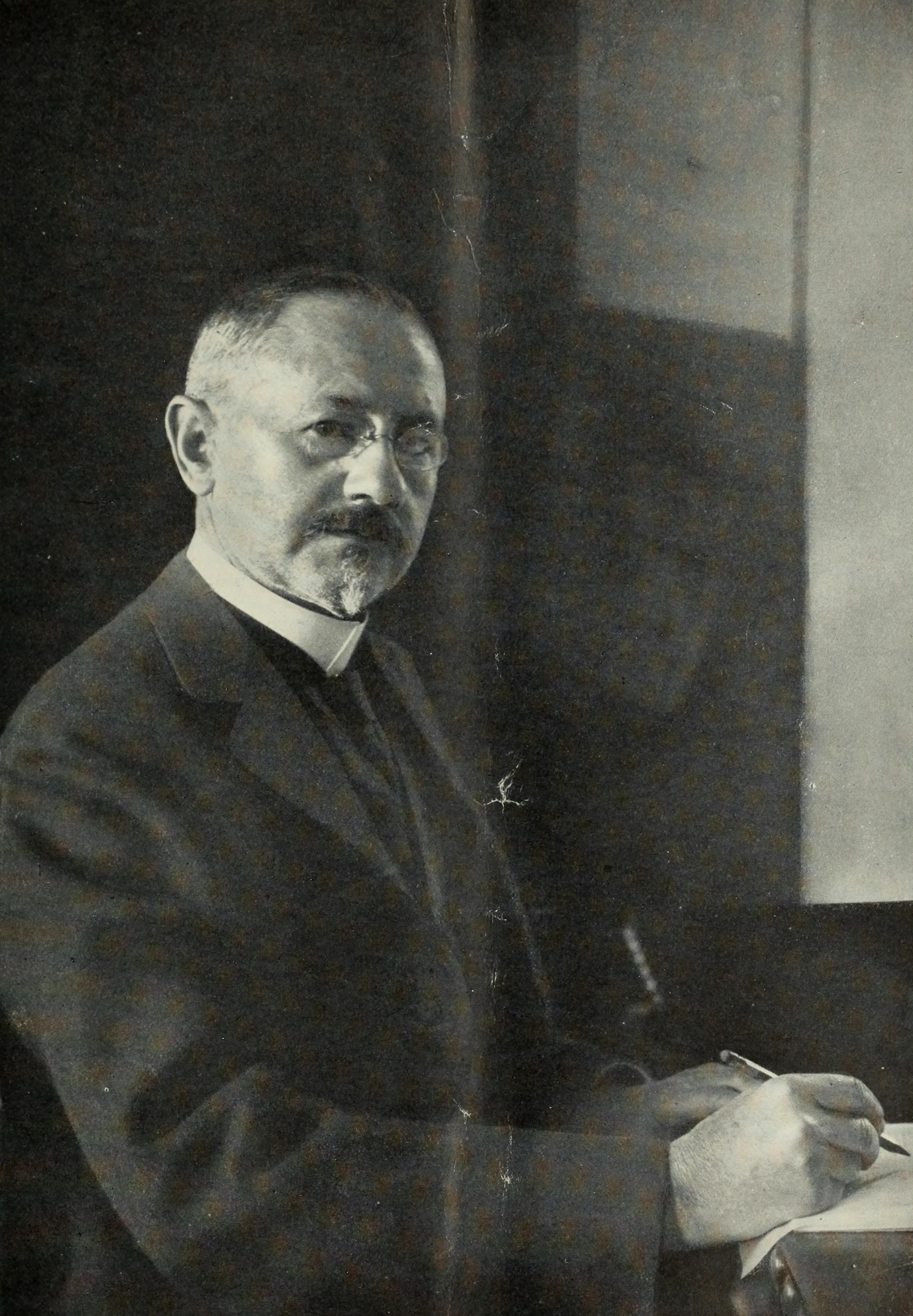
- Born: 8 December 1858; London, England, Great Britain
- Died: 18 September 1936 (aged 77); Fairfield, Connecticut, United States
- Education: College of the City of New York
- Occupation: Publisher
- Known for: Publisher of Jack London
- Children: George Platt Brett Jr. Claire L. Brett McKinney; Richard M Brett; Mary Edith Brett (step-daughter)
- Father: George Edward Brett

George Platt Brett Sr. (8 December 1858 – 18 September 1936) was a British-born chairman and publisher of the American division of Macmillan Publishing. He was best known for serving as publisher, friend, and mentor of American author Jack London. Under Brett's leadership, Macmillan became one of the largest publishers in America. Sales grew from $50,000 in 1890 and grew to $8.5 million in 1931. In 1931, Macmillan annuals produced between 600 and 700 titles.

== Career ==
=== Early career ===
In 1874 George Platt Brett, joined the MacMillan as a traveling salesman, then succeeded his father, George Edward Brett, in the American office in New York in 1887. George Edward Brett of England started the New York branch of Macmillan Publishing at Clayton Hall in 1869 under the recommendation of Alexander Macmillan.

In 1890, the New York branch became an independent office and moved to Bond Street.

In 1889, Brett was a founding member of the American Publishers Association.

On 4 December 1900, Brett attended a reception and dinner for Mark Twain at the Aldine Club that "was the most notable event of the kind that has ever taken place at that club."

In 1902, Brett became the first American publisher to visit London.

=== Established control of Macmillan in America ===
In 1896, Brett was asked by the Macmillans to head the New York office. Brett instead insisted he become a partner in a new American corporation. "In 1896, the Macmillan house was divided into two newly established entities, The Macmillan Company in New York and Macmillan & Co., Ltd., of London. The two companies were both controlled by the Macmillan family (which retained about 61 percent of the American company's stock until the 1951 split); they freely shared titles and authors and made use of the company's worldwide network of sales branches established in the early twentieth century in such ports of call as Bombay (established 1901); Toronto (1904); Calcutta (1907); Melbourne (1912); and Madras (1913). Nevertheless, the creation of a separate company in New York was destined to have profound implications for the house of Macmillan, as the American organization outstripped its parent and eventually required complete independence at mid-century."

=== Expansion into Canada ===
Assisted Frederick Macmillan with the creation of Macmillan Company of Canada, a joint effort between Macmillan & Company and Macmillan Company of New York.

=== Testimony before the United States Congress ===
In 1927, Brett testified at public hearings of the Patents Committee of the United States House of Representatives about a new national copyright law.

=== Publisher of American authors ===
Brett, though a native of Great Britain, was an advocate for American authors.

During his tenure, Brett published Winston Churchill's novel Richard Carvel in 1899, Ellen Glasgow Upton Sinclair's The Jungle in 1904, Jack London's The Call of the Wild, William Butler Yeats, Liberty Hyde Bailey and Francis Marion Crawford's Saracinesca.

George Doran called Brett an "Emperor among publishers".

Brett is credited with the identification and success of Jack London. In a letter to Jack London, dated 27 December 1901, "Brett said he believe Jack's fiction represented 'the very best kind of work ' done in America and he wanted to publish all his future writings."

Brett also was influential in the success of Winston Churchill. Churchill once observed Brett "has an undoubted genius for publishing, but he possesses likewise the higher genius of friendship."

=== Legacy in America ===
Led by Brett, the Macmillan Co. became prominent in American publishing by the 1930s as "the first American publisher to open branch offices across the country. ... Between 1895 and 1909 such semi-independent branches were established in Chicago, Boston, Atlanta, Dallas, and San Francisco."

The Bretts remained in control of the American offices of Macmillan from its creation in 1869 to the early 1960s, "a span matched by few other families in the history of United States business."

== Personal life ==
Brett lived in New York at 267 West End Avenue, New York, New York. From 1906 he lived at a 260-acre estate located in the Greenfield Hill section of Fairfield, Connecticut where he maintained an outstanding pinetum on Congress St. The family donated pine land to the city which has been augmented to become the 185-acre conservation area now known as Brett Woods. Brett also had a winter home in Coral Gables, Florida. Brett married Marie Louise Brett in 1893. The couple had four children including George Platt Brett Jr. He took over as president and chairman of the Macmillan Company after his father's death. He died on 18 September 1936 at Fairfield, Connecticut.

== Bibliography ==
The World Today May 1905 (Volume VIII No 5)

== See also ==
- George Edward Brett
- George Platt Brett
- Richard M. Brett
- Macmillan Publishing

== Bibliography ==
- Treasury tax-free bonds by George Platt Brett (unknown binding - 1928)
- Book publishing and its present tendencies by George Platt Brett (unknown binding - 1914)
- "A plea for the abolition of the duty on books: To which is added some remarks on the present rulings of the customs officials in the administration of ... in part from The New York Evening Post by George Platt Brett (unknown binding - 1903)
- Why imported books cost so much, : How the Treasury defeats the intent of Congress" by George Platt Brett (unknown binding - 1927)
- The World Today May 1905 (Volume VIII No 5) by Shailer Mathews, Count Cassini, Victoria Von Kreuter, and George P. Brett (paperback - 1905)

== Additional resources ==
- Chronicles of Barabbas 1884–1934 By George H. Doran
- The House of Macmillan (1843–1943) by Charles Morgan
- The Rise of the Conglomerates in American Publishing by Donald Lamm
- "Declare for free books: Publishers are opposed to increased duties". The New York Times. 18 January 1897.
- "Interesting People: George P. Brett". The American Magazine. Crowell-Collier Pub. co. 1911.
- "Winston Churchill: The Novelist as Reformer", The New England Quarterly, Vol. 47, No. 4 (Dec. 1974), pp. 495–517 (article consists of 23 pages)
- article about George Brett and Macmillan Canada
- Minders of Make-Believe: Idealists, Entrepreneurs, and the Shaping of American Children's Literature by Leonard Marcus (hardcover - 7 May 2008)
- Boys' & Girls' Book Series Real World Adventures: Identification & Values by Diane McClure Jones and Rosemary Jones (paperback - Oct 2001)
- The Spinster and the Prophet: H.G. Wells, Florence Deeks, and the Case of the Plagiarized Text by A.B. McKillop (hardcover - 5 September 2002
- The Puzzle Palace: Inside the National Security Agency, America's Most Secret Intelligence Organization by James Bamford (paperback - 29 September 1983)
- The History of Beginning Reading: From Teaching by Sound to Teaching by Meaning, Vol. 2 by Geraldine E. Rodgers
- Masters of Achievement: The World's Greatest Leaders in Literature, Art, Religion, Philosophy, Science, Politics and Industry Part Two by Frontier Press Company (paperback - 19 August 2004)
- The Collected Letters of Joseph Conrad: Volume 5, 1912–1916 (The Cambridge Edition of the Letters of Joseph Conrad) by Joseph Conrad, Frederick Karl, and Laurence Davies (hardcover - 26 January 1996)

Preceded by none	Macmillan Publishing USA Chairman; 1936–1958	Succeeded by George Platt Brett Jr.
