= Maurice Macmillan =

British politician (1921–1984)

The Right Honourable Viscount Macmillan of Ovenden
- Macmillan in 1957
Ministerial offices
Paymaster General
In office 2 December 1973 – 4 March 1974
| Prime Minister | Edward Heath |
| Preceded by | The Viscount Eccles |
| Succeeded by | Edmund Dell |
Secretary of State for Employment
In office 7 April 1972 – 2 December 1973
| Prime Minister | Edward Heath |
| Preceded by | Robert Carr |
| Succeeded by | William Whitelaw |
Chief Secretary to the Treasury
In office 23 June 1970 – 7 April 1972
| Prime Minister | Edward Heath |
| Preceded by | Jack Diamond |
| Succeeded by | Patrick Jenkin |

Member of Parliament for South West Surrey
- In office 9 June 1983 – 10 March 1984
- Preceded by: new constituency
- Succeeded by: Virginia Bottomley

Member of Parliament for Farnham
- In office 31 March 1966 – 13 May 1983
- Preceded by: Godfrey Nicholson
- Succeeded by: constituency abolished

Member of Parliament for Halifax
- In office 26 May 1955 – 25 September 1964
- Preceded by: Dryden Brook
- Succeeded by: Shirley Summerskill

Personal details
- Born: 27 January 1921 Westminster, London, England
- Died: 10 March 1984 (aged 63) Westminster, London, England
- Spouse: Katherine Ormsby-Gore (m. 1942)
- Children: 5, including: Alexander Macmillan, 2nd Earl of Stockton
- Parents: Harold Macmillan; Lady Dorothy Cavendish
- Education: Eton College
- Alma mater: Balliol College, Oxford

Maurice Victor Macmillan, Viscount Macmillan of Ovenden (27 January 1921 – 10 March 1984), was a British Conservative Party politician and Member of Parliament. He was the only son of Harold Macmillan, who was Prime Minister of the United Kingdom from 1957 to 1963.

== Background and education ==
Macmillan was the only son of Harold Macmillan, 1st Earl of Stockton, and Lady Dorothy Cavendish, daughter of Victor Cavendish, 9th Duke of Devonshire. He was educated at Eton and Balliol College, Oxford. He served with the Sussex Yeomanry in Europe in the Second World War. Like his father, he was chairman of Macmillan Publishers, as well as a director of two news agencies.

== Political career ==
Macmillan contested Seaham at the 1945 election, Lincoln in 1951 and Wakefield at a 1954 by-election. He served on Kensington Borough Council from 1949 to 1953, then was elected MP for Halifax at the 1955 general election but lost this seat in 1964. He was then elected for Farnham in 1966. This latter seat became South West Surrey at the 1983 election. He served as Economic Secretary to the Treasury (1963–64) under Alec Douglas-Home, and as Chief Secretary to the Treasury (1970–72), Secretary of State for Employment (1972–73) and Paymaster General (1973–74) under Edward Heath. He was made a Privy Counsellor in 1972.

== Family ==
Macmillan married the Honourable Katharine Ormsby-Gore, daughter of William Ormsby-Gore, 4th Baron Harlech, on 22 August 1942. They had four sons and a daughter:

- Alexander Daniel Alan Macmillan, 2nd Earl of Stockton (born 10 October 1943)
- Joshua Edward Andrew Macmillan (1945–1965)
- Hon. Adam Julian Robert Macmillan (1948–2016)
- Hon. Rachel Mary Georgia Macmillan (1955–1987)
- Hon. David Maurice Benjamin Macmillan (born 1957); married English fashion designer Arabella Pollen in 1995 and has issue.

Macmillan was for a time the owner of Highgrove House, which he sold to the Prince of Wales in 1980. Upon his father's elevation to the peerage as Earl of Stockton on 24 February 1984, Macmillan acquired the courtesy title Viscount Macmillan of Ovenden. He held the title for just 16 days, because he died on 10 March 1984, in Westminster, London, following a heart operation. He was 63. His father outlived him by almost three years, dying in December 1986 at the age of 92.

Macmillan's son Alexander has held the title 2nd Earl of Stockton since the death of the first Earl.

== Arms ==
Coat of arms of Maurice Macmillan
| Crest [Upon a helm with a wreath Azure and Sable] within sprigs of oak fructed Or a dexter cubit Arm and a sinister Arm embowed both proper the dexter hand gauntleted Or and with the other brandishing a two handed Sword proper hilt pommel and quillons Sable. Escutcheon Argent a chief Or overall between three open books Proper edged Or and bound Azure those in chief inscribed respectively in letters Sable "Miseres" and "Discere" and that in base also in letters Sable inscribed "Succo" and as many mullets Azure a lion rampant Sable. |

Parliament of the United Kingdom
| Preceded by Dryden Brook | Member of Parliament for Halifax; 1955–1964 | Succeeded by Dr Shirley Summerskill |
| Preceded by Godfrey Nicholson | Member of Parliament for Farnham; 1966–1983 | Constituency abolished |
| New constituency | Member of Parliament for South West Surrey; 1983–1984 | Succeeded by Virginia Bottomley |
Political offices
| Preceded by John Diamond | Chief Secretary to the Treasury; 1970–1972 | Succeeded by Patrick Jenkin |
| Preceded by Robert Carr | Secretary of State for Employment; 1972–1973 | Succeeded by William Whitelaw |
| Preceded by The Viscount Eccles | Paymaster General; 1973–1974 | Succeeded by Edmund Dell |
