= Katharine Macmillan, Viscountess Macmillan of Ovenden =

British aristocrat (1921-2017)

Viscountess Macmillan of Ovenden DBE

Personal details
- Born: Katharine Margaret Alice Ormsby-Gore; 4 January 1921
- Died: 22 January 2017 (aged 96)
- Spouse: Maurice Macmillan, Viscount Macmillan of Ovenden (m. 1942; died 1984)
- Children: Alexander Macmillan, 2nd Earl of Stockton; Joshua Macmillan; Adam Macmillan; Rachel Macmillan; David Macmillan
- Parents: William Ormsby-Gore, 4th Baron Harlech (father); Lady Beatrice Gascoyne-Cecil (mother)

Katharine Margaret Alice Macmillan, Viscountess Macmillan of Ovenden (née Ormsby-Gore; 4 January 1921 – 22 January 2017), was the daughter of the 4th Baron Harlech, granddaughter of the 4th Marquess of Salisbury, great-granddaughter of the 10th Marquess of Huntly and daughter-in-law of Prime Minister Harold Macmillan, 1st Earl of Stockton.

On 22 August 1942, she married Conservative politician Maurice Macmillan, making her the daughter-in-law of fellow Conservative politician Harold Macmillan, who would serve as prime minister from 1957 to 1963.

They had five children together:

- 1) Alexander Daniel Alan Macmillan, 2nd Earl of Stockton (born 1943)
- 2) Joshua Edward Andrew Macmillan (1945–1965)
- 3) Adam Julian Robert Macmillan (1948–2016)
- 4) Rachel Mary Georgia Macmillan (1955–1987)
- 5) David Maurice Benjamin Macmillan (born 1957)

She was Vice-Chairman of the Conservative Party in 1968 and was created a Dame Commander of the Order of the British Empire (DBE) in 1974. She became Viscountess Macmillan of Ovenden in February 1984 when her father-in-law, former British prime minister Harold Macmillan, accepted a peerage and was created Earl of Stockton. Her husband died the following month, so never inherited the earldom from his father.

She died on 22 January 2017.
