= Daniel Macmillan, Viscount Macmillan of Ovenden =

British fashion designer (born 1974)

Viscount Macmillan of Ovenden
- Born: Daniel Maurice Alan Macmillan; 9 October 1974 (age 51)
- Occupation: Fashion designer
- Father: Alexander Macmillan, 2nd Earl of Stockton
- Relatives: Harold Macmillan (great-grandfather)

Daniel Maurice Alan Macmillan, Viscount Macmillan of Ovenden (born 9 October 1974) is a British fashion designer and the only son of Alexander Macmillan, 2nd Earl of Stockton. As the heir apparent to an earldom, he uses his father's secondary title of Viscount Macmillan of Ovenden as a courtesy title. He is a great-grandson of Prime Minister Harold Macmillan, 1st Earl of Stockton.

== Life and career ==
He grew up at Birch Grove, the family's former home in Sussex, and was educated at Eton College and the Parsons School of Design in New York City.

In 2003, he designed and launched the Zoltar fashion label, with Barnzley Armitage as creative director. Prior to that, he had his own fashion label, 'Macvillain'.

In addition to his clothing label, Macmillan has worked as a model, actor, and photographer. He is said to have dated models Kate Moss and Jade Jagger.

Macmillan does not plan to enter the family publishing business, after his father sold it to German publisher Holtzbrinck in the 1990s. He is heir to a £200 million fortune.
