= George Platt Brett =

American book publisher

George Platt Brett Jr.
- Born: December 9, 1893; Darien, Connecticut, U.S.
- Died: February 11, 1984 (aged 90); Southport, Connecticut, U.S.
- Occupation: Publisher
- Known for: Publisher of Gone with the Wind; Head of Macmillan Publishers (United States)
- Spouse: Isabel Stevenson Yeomans
- Children: George Platt Brett III; Bruce Yeomans Brett
- Father: George Platt Brett Sr.

George Platt Brett Jr. (December 9, 1893 – February 11, 1984) served at Chairman of the American division of Macmillan Publishing and secured publishing rights to Gone With the Wind.

== Biography ==
=== Career ===
George Brett started with Macmillan in 1913 as a traveling salesman and took over as President of Macmillan in 1931. Brett took over as chairman in 1936 after the death of his father, George Platt Brett Sr.

Brett is best known for having "scored one of publishing's all-time triumphs by gaining the rights to 'Gone With the Wind.' The success of Gone with the Wind from 1935 to 1936 lead to bonuses of 18% to all employees at Macmillan. Additional literary success under Brett were Rachael Filed's All This and Heaven Too and Katleen Winsor's Forever Amber. In addition, Brett published notable authors C. S. Lewis and Marianne Moore.

In 1939, Brett promoted a special motion picture edition of Gone with the Wind at the same time the film was being released. Brett was the first to introduce marketing a book and movie at the same time. This was perhaps the earliest instance in the book publishing industry of the "tie-in," a marketing strategy which involves a mass media commodity appearing simultaneously in several formats that advertise each other.

In 1944 Brett fought efforts by the British Publisher Bureau to corner the American market for British publishing houses. In 1951, Brett bought the US division from London based Macmillan Publishing. At this time Macmillan was the second largest publisher in the United States

Brett was succeeded by his son, Bruce Y. Brett in 1958.

=== Military and Public Service ===
- From 1916 to 1919, he served with the United States Army on the Mexican border and then in France during World War I. Commissioned 2nd Lieutenant, Infantry, August 15, 1917, promoted 1st Lieutenant, January 12, 1918, and Captain, August 22, 1918.
- Served as chairman of the book committee of the People to People Student Ambassador Program United States President Dwight D. Eisenhower established in 1956.
- Serve on missions for the United States State Department in Latin America and postwar Germany.

=== Memberships ===
- Member of the Players Club

=== Personal life ===
Brett was born in Darien, Connecticut, and attended the Salisbury School in his home state and the Collegiate School in New York City. Brett was married to Isabel Stevenson Yeomans. He died in 1984.

== See also ==
- George Edward Brett
- George Platt Brett Sr.
- Richard M. Brett

== Bibliography ==
- "The role of books in inter-American relations" by George Platt Brett (Unknown Binding - 1943)
- The growth and care of cultivated evergreens: An address delivered before the Garden Club of Fairfield on May 26, 1931 (Unknown Binding)

== Additional information ==
- Chronicles of Barabbas 1884–1934 By George H. Doran
- The House of Macmillan (1843–1943) by Charles Morgan
- The Structure of International Publishing in the 1990s By Fred Kobrak, Beth Luey
- New York Times article "Stefansson a Hero to British Public: George P. Brett back from London with a glowing account of the Young Explorers Success, printed on April 13, 1913
- New York Times March 13, 1913 article about Brett book "Book publishing and its present tendencies"
- New York Times article about Macmillan and George Brett

== Sources ==
- Young, David (Fall 1995), "The Macmillan Company of Canada in the 1930s", Journal of Canadian Studies, 30 (3), Trent University: 117–33, archived from the original on April 17, 2008.

Preceded by George Platt Brett Sr.	Macmillan Publishing USA Chairman; 1936–1958	Succeeded by Bruce Brett
