= Miranda Macmillan =

British socialite and model (1947–2020)

Miranda Macmillan, Countess of Stockton
- Born: Miranda Elizabeth Louise Quarry; 27 May 1947; Wokingham, Berkshire, England
- Died: 18 March 2020 (aged 72)
- Occupations: Socialite; fashion model
- Spouse(s): Peter Sellers (m. 1970; div. 1974) Sir Nicholas Nuttall (m. 1975; div. 1983) Alexander Macmillan, 2nd Earl of Stockton (m. 1995; div. 2011)
- Children: 3
- Relatives: Stormont Mancroft (stepfather); Benjamin Mancroft, 3rd Baron Mancroft (half-brother)

Miranda Elizabeth Louise Macmillan, Countess of Stockton (née Quarry; 27 May 1947 – 18 March 2020) was a British socialite and fashion model.

== Early life ==
Born in 1947, in Wokingham, Berkshire, Miranda Quarry's parents were Richard Bridges St John Quarry, a British Army officer in the Royal Corps of Signals, and his wife Diana Elizabeth Lloyd, daughter of Lieutenant-Colonel Horace Lloyd. She had an older sister, Venitia, born in 1942. The family lived in Berkshire, but the Quarrys divorced while Miranda was still a small child.

In 1951, Diana Quarry married secondly Stormont Mancroft, a Conservative politician. She had three more children, two daughters and a son, Benjamin Mancroft.

When in 1962 her older sister Venitia married Frederick Barker, a future master of the Quorn, their father was living at Gaddeshill House, Eversley, Hampshire, and their mother at 48 Montagu Square, Marylebone. Venitia was reported to be a good side-saddle rider.

Quarry was educated at Crofton Grange School in Hertfordshire and a finishing school in Paris. After leaving school, she travelled through Spain and Italy and lived in New York City, then returned to England and was given a job by Michael Fish, fashion designer and outfitter. She became a fashion model and an It girl, before working as a flower seller at the Dorchester Hotel.

== Marriages and children ==
Miranda met the actor Peter Sellers, a customer of Michael Fish, but Sellers did not take an interest in her until seeing her at the Dorchester. In 1970, she married him at the Caxton Hall, Westminster, wearing a gypsy dress and accompanied by her two Pekinese dogs. They set up home on an estate in County Kildare, Ireland, but within three years the marriage broke down, with Sellers accusing Miranda of infidelities. They were divorced in 1974 but remained friends until Sellers died in 1980.

In 1975, Miranda married Sir Nicholas Nuttall, and they divided their time between Britain and the Bahamas. They remained together until 1983 and had three daughters: Gytha Miranda (1975), Amber Louise (1977) and Olympia Jubilee (1978).

Her third husband was Alexander Macmillan, 2nd Earl of Stockton, whom she married in 1995. They divorced in 2011. She died at home of pancreatic cancer on 18 March 2020 after a short illness.
