= Daniel MacMillan =

Scottish publisher (1813–1857)

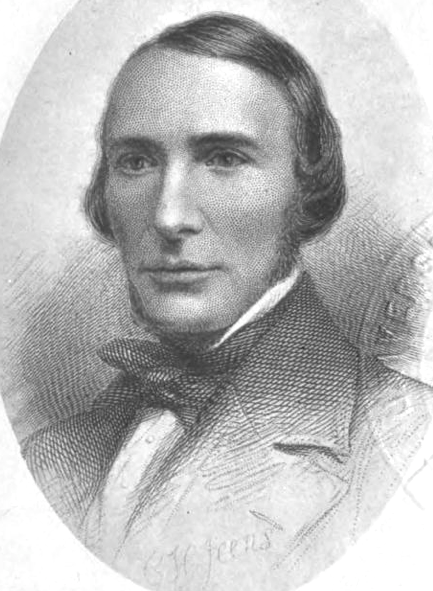
- Born: 13 September 1813; Achog, Isle of Arran, Scotland
- Died: 27 June 1857 (aged 43); Cambridge, England
- Occupations: Bookseller; publisher

Daniel MacMillan (Scottish Gaelic: Dòmhnall MacMhaolain; 13 September 1813 – 27 June 1857) was a Scottish publisher from the Isle of Arran, Scotland. MacMillan was one of the co-founders of Macmillan Publishers along with his brother Alexander in London.

== Life ==
Daniel MacMillan was born on 13 September 1813 on the farm of Achog, just north of Corrie on the Isle of Arran, to a crofting family. Moving to London, he founded Macmillan Publishers, with his brother Alexander.

In 1833, he came to London to work for a Cambridge bookseller. In 1844, he decided to expand into the publishing business.

Macmillan, with the recommendation of his brother Alexander, sent George Edward Brett to open the first American office in New York.

He died in Cambridge on 27 June 1857. He is buried in the Mill Road cemetery, Cambridge.

== Family ==
He married, on 4 September 1850, Frances, daughter of a Mr Orridge, a chemist in Cambridge. They had two sons, Frederick (born 1851) and Maurice Crawford Macmillan (1853–1936). Maurice married Helen (Nellie) Artie Tarleton Belles (1856–1937), and their son Maurice Harold Macmillan became prime minister.
