= Alexander MacMillan (publisher) =

Scottish cofounder of Macmillan Publishers

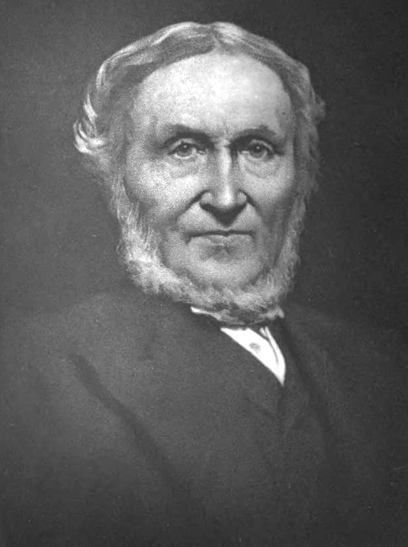
Portrait of Alexander Macmillan

Alexander MacMillan (Scottish Gaelic: Alasdair MacMhaolain; 3 October 1818 – 25 January 1896), born in Irvine, Ayrshire, Scotland, was a cofounder, in 1843, with his brother Daniel, of Macmillan Publishers in Covent Garden, London. His family were crofters from the Isle of Arran.

Alexander was the partner who developed the literary reputation of the company, while Daniel took charge of the business and commercial side. Originally called Macmillan & Co., the firm started as a successful bookshop in Cambridge. The brothers soon started publishing books as well as selling them. After Daniel's death in 1857, Alexander continued to run the firm. He expanded the company into a worldwide organization and also started publishing magazines, including the prestigious scientific journal Nature. Macmillan assigned George Edward Brett to create the New York office in August 1869, and hired American firm Messrs. Pott & Amery to assist in the marketing and distribution of Macmillan's books.

Alexander's brother Daniel was the grandfather of Harold Macmillan, who became Prime Minister of the United Kingdom.

== See also ==
- Bowes & Bowes
- Macmillan Publishing
