= George Edward Brett =

American publisher (1829–1890)

- Born: 1829; Halling, Kent, England
- Died: 11 June 1890 (aged 60–61); New York City, United States
- Occupation: Publisher
- Known for: Opening first American office of Macmillan Publishing
- Children: George Platt Brett Sr.

George Edward Brett (1829–1890) opened the first American office of Macmillan Publishing called Macmillan & Co. of New York.

== Career ==
Brett was assigned by Alexander Macmillan (publisher) to create the New York Office in August 1869. Brett was aided in the creation of the New York office by American firm Messrs Pott & Amery. Frederick Macmillan, commenting on Brett resignation letter, said "We have all been profoundly touched by your letter . . . it is a great achievement for a man to go through this life with a spotless reputation & to be successful in what he sets himself to do. You will have succeeded in both these aims, and whatever fortune may have in store for the New York Agency, we shall not forget who it was that brought it through troublous times." The Bretts remained in control of the American offices of Macmillan from its creation in 1869 to the early 1960s, “a span matched by few other families in the history of United States business.”

Brett opened the New York branch of Macmillan Publishing at Clayton Hall., 53 Bleecker Street, New York, NY.

On May 1, 1890, Brett's son George Platt Brett Sr., succeeded him as head of the New York office of Macmillan.

Prior to joining Macmillan, Brett worked for Simpkin Marshall & Co.

== See also ==
- George Platt Brett Sr.
- George Platt Brett
- Richard M. Brett
- Macmillan Publishing

== Sources ==
- Chronicles of Barabbas (1884–1934) by George H. Doran
- The House of Macmillan (1843–1943) by Charles Morgan
