= Macmillan Publishers =

International publishing company

Pan Macmillan
- Logo
- Parent company: Holtzbrinck Publishing Group
- Founded: 1843; 183 years ago
- Founders: Daniel MacMillan; Alexander MacMillan
- Country of origin: United Kingdom
- Headquarters location: London, United Kingdom
- Key people: Jon Yaged (CEO, USA); Joanna Prior (CEO, UK)
- Publication types: Books
- Revenue: $1.4 billion
- Official website: macmillan.com panmacmillan.com

Macmillan Publishers (Pan Macmillan in the UK and Macmillan Publishers in the US) is a British publishing company traditionally considered to be one of the "Big Five" English-language publishers (along with Penguin Random House, Hachette, HarperCollins and Simon & Schuster).

Founded in London in 1843 by Scottish brothers Daniel and Alexander Macmillan, the firm soon established itself as a leading publisher in Britain. It published two of the best-known works of Victorian-era children's literature, Lewis Carroll's Alice's Adventures in Wonderland (1865) and Rudyard Kipling's The Jungle Book (1894).

Former prime minister of the United Kingdom Harold Macmillan, grandson of co-founder Daniel, was chairman of the company from 1964 until his death in December 1986.

Since 1999, Pan Macmillan and Macmillan Publishers have been wholly owned subsidiaries of Holtzbrinck Publishing Group, with offices in 41 countries worldwide and operations in more than 30 others.

== History ==
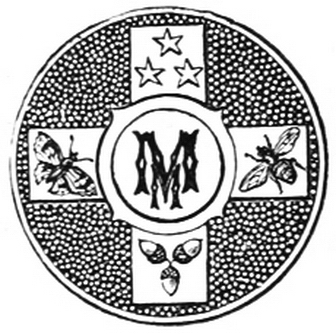
Macmillan logo for Alice's Adventures in Wonderland, published in London on 26 November 1865

Macmillan was founded in London by Daniel and Alexander MacMillan, two brothers from the Isle of Arran, Scotland. Daniel was for some time assistant to the bookseller Elijah Johnson in Cambridge, but entered the employ of Messrs Seeley in London in 1837. In 1843, he began business in Aldersgate Street, and in the same year, the two brothers purchased the business of Thomas Newby in Cambridge. A branch office was opened in 1858 in Henrietta Street, London, which led to a great extension of trade. These premises were surrendered for larger ones in Bedford Street, and in 1897, the buildings in St Martin's Lane were opened. By then, the firm had been converted into a limited liability company, its chairman being one of Daniel's sons, Frederick Macmillan, who was knighted in 1909.

Daniel was the business brain, while Alexander laid the literary foundations, publishing such notable authors as Charles Kingsley (1855), Thomas Hughes (1859), Francis Turner Palgrave (1861), Christina Rossetti (1862), Matthew Arnold (1865) and Lewis Carroll (1865), with the latter first meeting Alexander in London on 19 October 1863. Alfred, Lord Tennyson joined the list in 1884, Thomas Hardy in 1886 and Rudyard Kipling in 1890.

Other major writers published by Macmillan included W. B. Yeats, Rabindranath Tagore, Nirad C. Chaudhuri, Seán O'Casey, John Maynard Keynes, Charles Morgan, Hugh Walpole, Margaret Mitchell, C. P. Snow, Rumer Godden and Ram Sharan Sharma.

Beyond literature, the company created such enduring titles as Nature (1869), the Grove Dictionary of Music and Musicians (1877) and Sir Robert Harry Inglis Palgrave's Dictionary of Political Economy (1894–99).

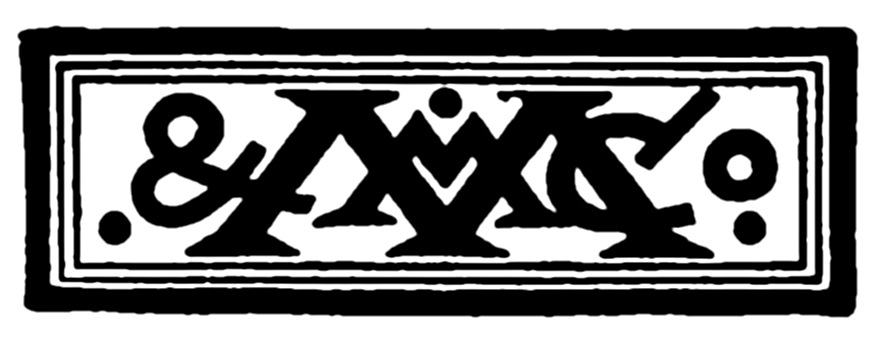
This logo appeared in Leslie Stephen's biography of Alexander Pope, published by Macmillan & Co in London in 1880.

George Edward Brett opened the first Macmillan office in the United States in 1869 and Macmillan sold its U.S. operations to the Brett family, George Platt Brett Sr. and George Platt Brett Jr., in 1896, resulting in the creation of an American company, Macmillan Publishing, also called The Macmillan Company (later known as Macmillan Inc. or Macmillan US). Even with the split of the American company from its parent company in England, George Brett Jr. and Harold Macmillan remained close personal friends. Macmillan Publishers held stake in the American company before divesting it in 1951, and later re-entered the American market in 1952 under the name St. Martin's Press.

Macmillan of Canada was founded in 1905; Maclean-Hunter acquired the company in 1973. Following numerous mergers, Macmillan Canada dissolved in 2002 after John Wiley & Co. acquired it.

Harold Macmillan, grandson of company co-founder Daniel, became Prime Minister of the United Kingdom (10 January 1957 – 18 October 1963). Earlier, he had been with the family firm as a junior partner from 1920 to 1940 (when he became a junior minister, as Under-secretary of State for the Colonies), and working with Macmillan Publishers again from 1945 to 1951 while he was also in the opposition in Parliament. After retiring from politics in 1964, he became chairman of the company until 1974, when he handed on the chairmanship to his son Maurice Macmillan. The latter, having been Paymaster General in the defeated government of Edward Heath, also left the government, but within the company took on the more honorary position of president until his death in December 1986.

Macmillan became the sole owner of Pan Books in 1986, and by 1990, Pan formed with the trade division of Macmillan to form Pan Macmillan.

=== 21st century ===
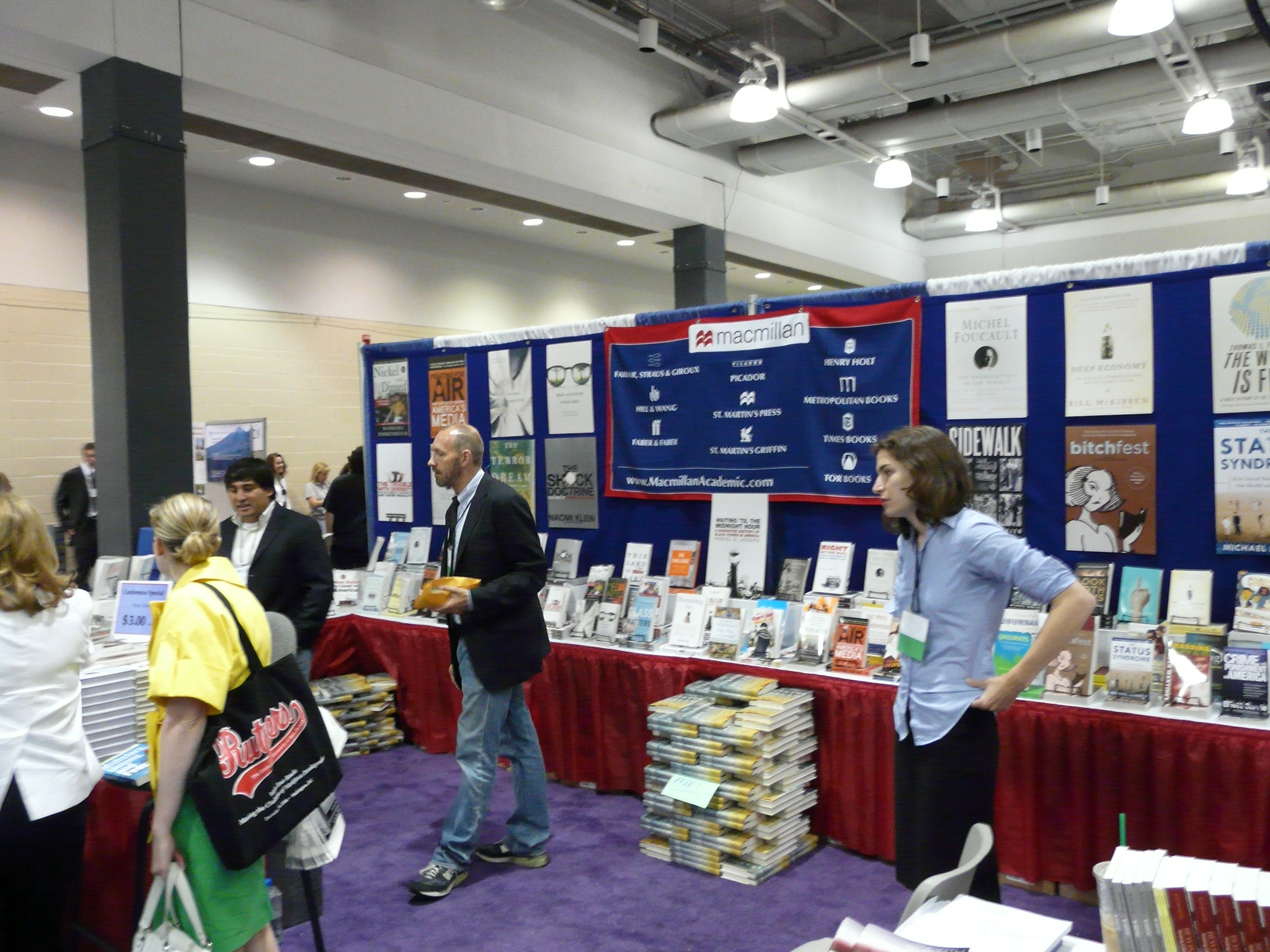
2008 conference booth

Pearson acquired the Macmillan name in America in 1998, following its purchase of the Simon & Schuster educational and professional group (which included various Macmillan Inc. properties and trademarks). Holtzbrinck purchased the name from them in 2001. McGraw-Hill continues to market its pre-kindergarten through elementary school titles under its Macmillan/McGraw-Hill brand. The US operations of Holtzbrinck Publishing changed its name to Macmillan in October 2007. Its audio publishing imprint changed its name from Audio Renaissance to Macmillan Audio, while its distribution arm was renamed from Von Holtzbrinck Publishers Services to Macmillan Publishers Services.

Pan Macmillan purchased Kingfisher, a British children's publisher, from Houghton Mifflin in October 2007. Kingfisher had originally launched in the 1970s under its former name, Grisewood and Dempsey. Following the acquisition, Roaring Brook Press publisher Simon Boughton took over management of Kingfisher's US business.

By 2009, some estimates put e-books at 3 to 5 per cent of total book sales, making them the fastest growing segment of the market. According to The New York Times, Macmillan and other major publishers "fear that massive discounting [of e-books] by retailers including Amazon, Barnes & Noble and Sony could ultimately devalue what consumers are willing to pay for books." In response, the publisher introduced a new boilerplate contract for its authors that established a royalty of 20 per cent of net proceeds on e-book sales, a rate 5 per cent lower than most other major publishers.

Following the announcement of the Apple iPad on 27 January 2010—a product that comes with access to the iBookstore—Macmillan gave Amazon.com two options: continue to sell e-books based on a price of the retailer's choice (the "wholesale model"), with the e-book edition released several months after the hardcover edition, or switch to the agency model introduced to the industry by Apple, in which both are released simultaneously and the price is set by the publisher. In the latter case, Amazon.com would receive a 30 per cent commission. Amazon responded by pulling all Macmillan books, both electronic and physical, from its website (although affiliates selling the books were still listed). On 31 January 2010, Amazon chose the agency model preferred by Macmillan.

In April 2012, the United States Department of Justice filed United States v. Apple Inc., naming Apple, Macmillan, and four other major publishers as defendants. The suit alleged that they conspired to fix prices for e-books and weaken Amazon.com's position in the market, in violation of antitrust law. In December 2013, a federal judge approved a settlement of the antitrust claims, in which Macmillan and the other publishers paid into a fund that provided credits to customers who had overpaid for books due to the price-fixing.

In 2012, parent company Holtzbrinck reorganized; Macmillan's consumer publishing operations in the US were now led by John Turner Sargent from New York City.

In 2018, Pan Macmillan announced it would move from its current location in King's Cross to a "larger and distinctive" new eight-storey headquarters in London's Clerkenwell.

In November 2019, Macmillan Publishers announced that libraries would be able to buy only one copy of their e-books for the first eight weeks after publication, in an effort to boost sales by creating long waits for borrowers at large library systems. This prompted complaints and some libraries boycotted the company; the policy was reversed in March 2020.

In 2020, Pan Macmillan was named Publisher of the Year at the British Book Awards for the third time in six years.

In September 2020, Macmillan announced that CEO John Sargent would be leaving at the end of the year due to "a disagreement regarding the direction of Macmillan." According to Holtzbrinck spokesperson Erin Coffey, the decision was made by Stefan von Holtzbrinck, CEO of the Holtzbrinck group.

In September 2021, it was announced that Joanna Prior would succeed Anthony Forbes-Watson as CEO of Pan Macmillan in the UK, described by Publishing Perspectives magazine as "a major move for women in book publishing leadership." In an interview with The Bookseller magazine in October 2023, Prior said, "Women have proved they are more than capable of running publishing companies. I feel it is entirely right and appropriate that these senior seats should be taken by women. I hope to bring the women up behind me."

In 2022, it was announced that Jon Yaged would become CEO of Macmillan Publishers in the US, replacing Don Weisberg.

In 2023, Pan Macmillan acquired business books publisher Harriman House, which had been founded by Philip Jenks and Stephen Eckett in 1992.

In May 2026, major publishers including Macmillan sued Meta Platforms, alleging that Meta used their books and journal articles, without their permission, to train Llama, its large language model.

== Divisions ==
=== American publishing divisions with imprints ===
- Celadon Books
- Farrar, Straus and Giroux
  - FSG Originals
  - Hill & Wang
  - MCD
  - North Point Press
  - Auwa Books
  - Picador
- Flatiron Books
  - Flatiron Books
  - Flatiron Books: An Oprah Book
- Henry Holt and Company
  - Andy Cohen Books
  - Henry Holt and Company
  - Metropolitan Books
- Macmillan Audio – formerly Audio Renaissance
- Macmillan Children's Publishing Group
  - Farrar, Straus & Giroux Books for Young Readers
  - Feiwel and Friends
  - First Second Books – Graphic novels
  - Henry Holt Books for Young Readers
  - Imprint
  - Neon Squid Books
  - Odd Dot
  - Priddy Books
  - Square Fish
  - Swoon Reads
- St. Martin's Publishing Group
  - Castle Point Books
  - Griffin
  - Minotaur
  - St. Martin's Essentials
  - St. Martin's Press
  - Wednesday Books
  - Saturday Books
- Tor Publishing Group
  - Bramble
  - Forge
  - Nightfire
  - Starscape
  - Tor Books
  - Tor Teen
  - Tordotcom Publishing
  - Reactor (magazine) (formerly Tor.com)

=== Other American divisions ===
- Macmillan Publishers Services, formerly Von Holtzbrinck Publishers Services, distribution unit for independent publishers:
  - Bloomsbury USA
  - The College Board
  - Drawn & Quarterly
  - Entangled Publishing
  - Graywolf Press
  - Guinness World Records
  - Macmillan UK
  - Page Street

=== Pan Macmillan British imprints ===
- Bluebird
- Campbell
- FirstInk
- Harriman House
- Kingfisher
- Macmillan
- Macmillan Business
- Macmillan's Children's Books
- Macmillan Collector's Library
- Mantle
- One Boat
- Pan Books
- Picador
- RocketFox
- Tor
- Two Hoots

== See also ==
- List of largest book publishers of the United Kingdom
