= Lansdowne House =

Historic house in Westminster, London, England

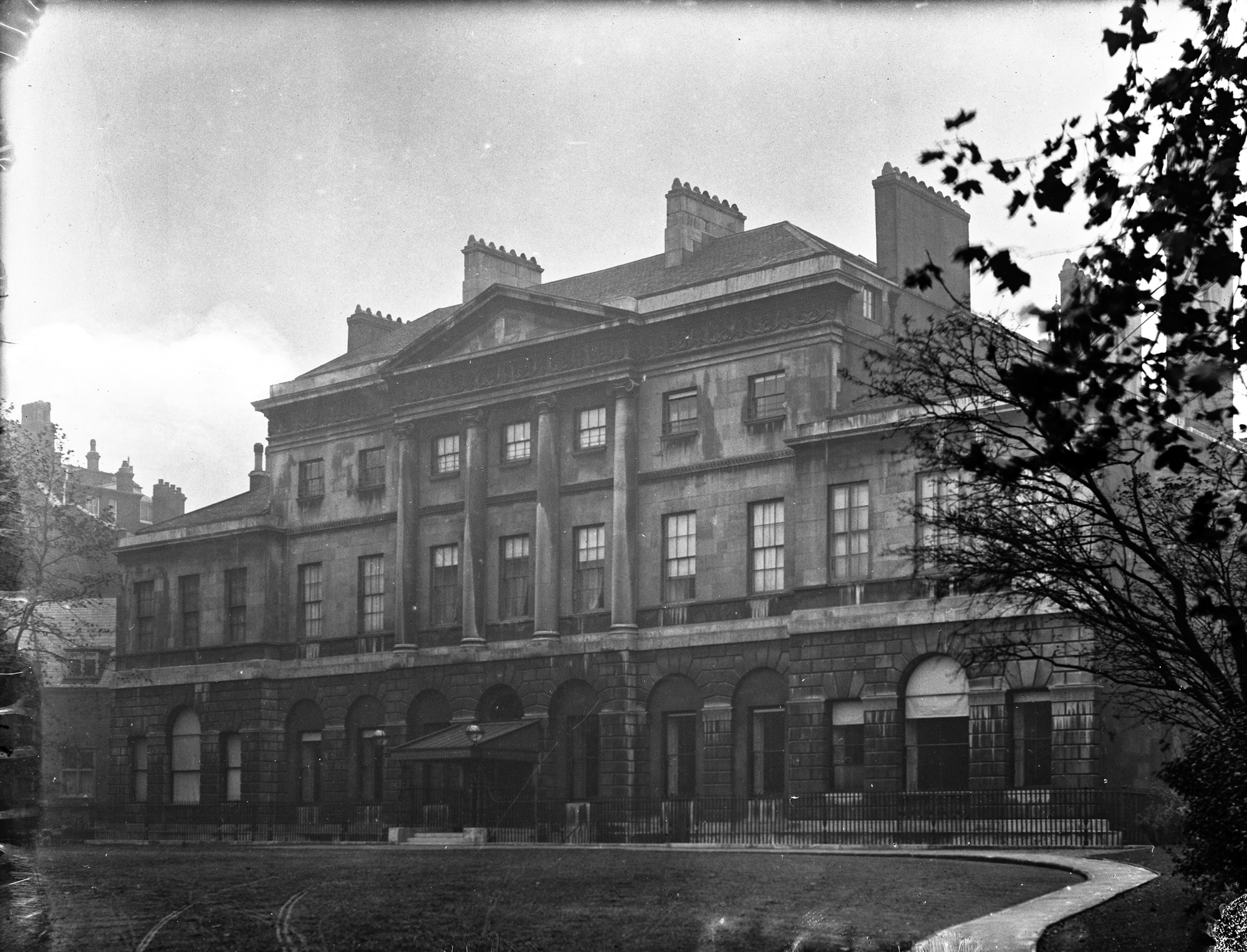
- The house before its eastern front rooms were demolished

- Location within Central London

General information
- Architectural style: Neo-classical
- Location: 9 Fitzmaurice Place; London, W1, United Kingdom
- Coordinates: 51°30′30″N 0°8′44″W
- Client: John Stuart, 3rd Earl of Bute; William Petty, 2nd Earl of Shelburne

Design and construction
- Architect: Robert Adam

Website
- Official website

Listed Building – Grade II
- Reference no.: 1066795

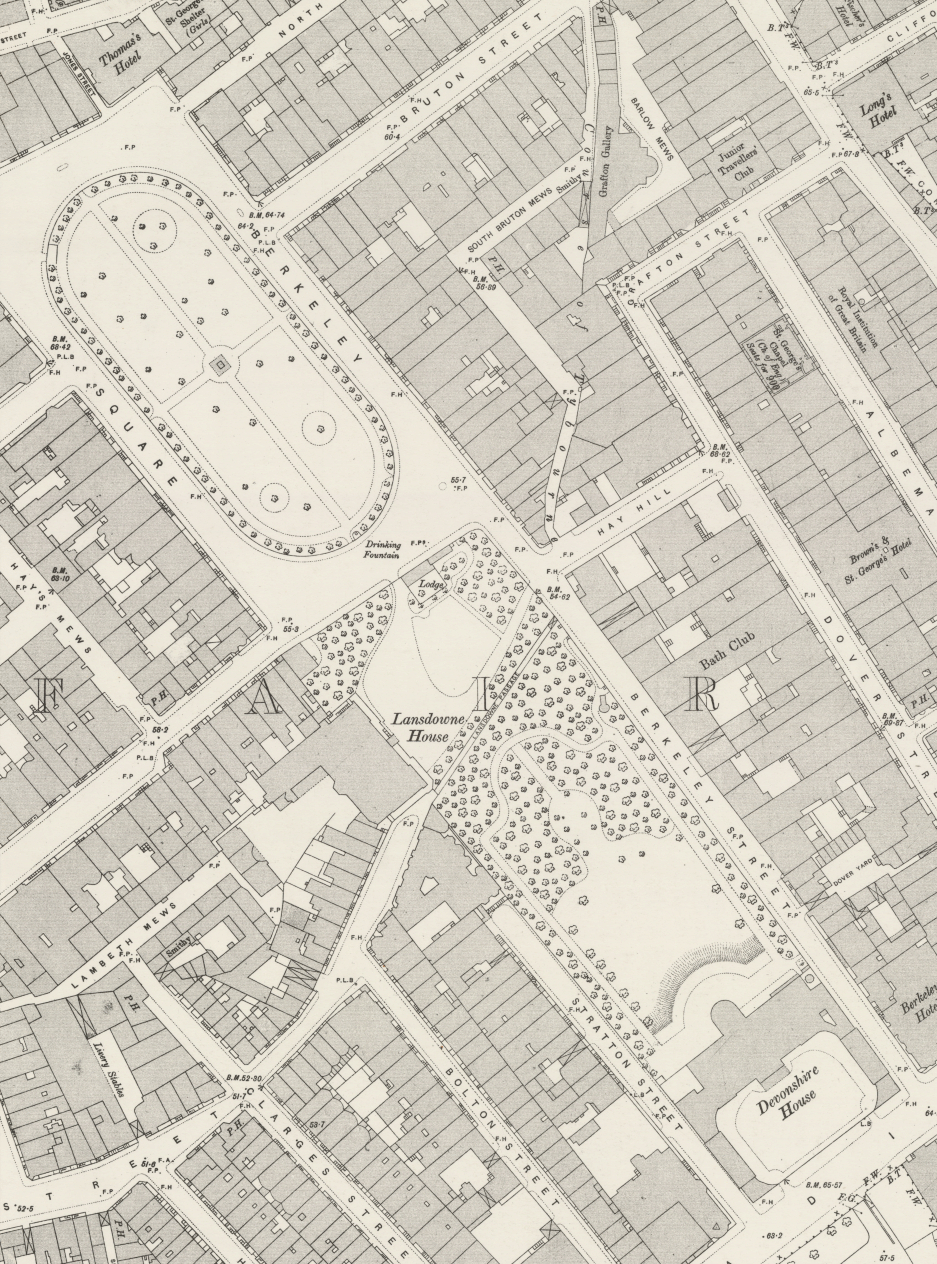
Lansdowne House, Berkeley Square and Devonshire House on a map of 1895

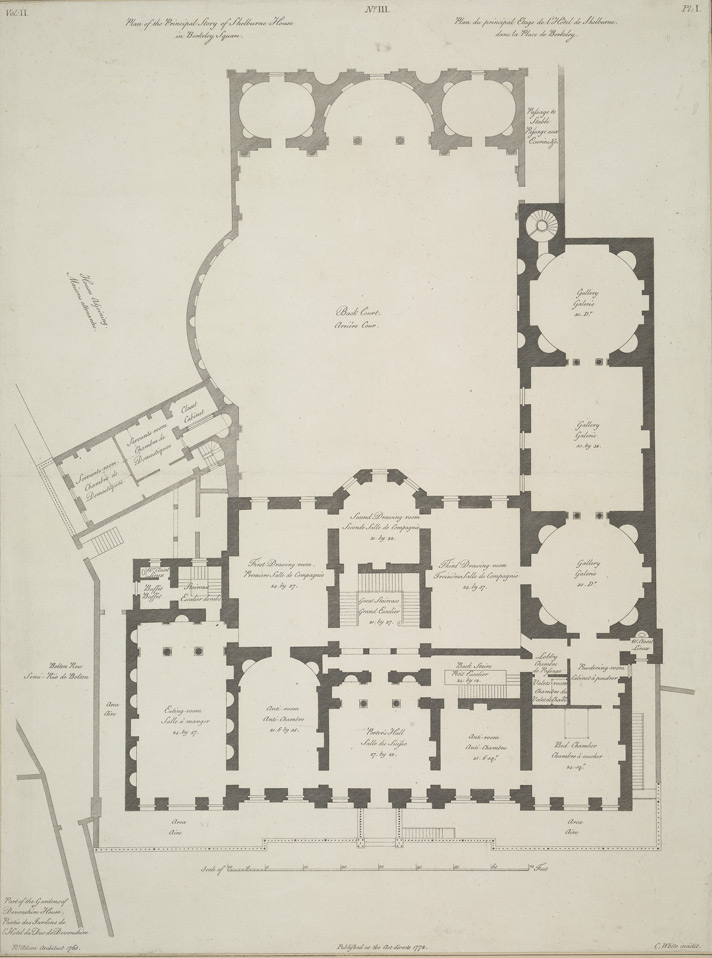
A plan of the main floor of the house published in 1765.

Lansdowne House, now 9 Fitzmaurice Place, is the remaining part of an aristocratic English town house to the south of Berkeley Square in the city of Westminster, England. (Note: Not to be confused with 57 Berkeley Square – opposite – a much later quadrilateral office building which takes its name as an extra line of address. 57 Berkeley Square occupies the vast bulk of Lansdowne House's former garden; the rest of the House's former land was strips forming roads on all four sides of the Berkeley Square neo-classical office building and small parts of three thin houses north of 9 Fitzmaurice Place)

The initial name was for two decades Shelburne House, before it was changed to match its owner's elevation to a higher peerage, Marquess of Lansdowne, in 1784. In the 19th century, the house was frequently let, as a whole, to men of high wealth or income, such as Lord Rosebery of Mentmore Towers from 1878 to 1890. Some of its 18th-century interiors, among the best in England, were removed and taken elsewhere. It was at different times leased by three 19th century British prime ministers, by William Waldorf Astor, 1st Viscount Astor of Cliveden House, widely believed to be the richest man in America at the time of his tenancy (1891–1893), and also by Harry Gordon Selfridge in the 1920s. In 1929, two years after the death of the 5th Marquess of Lansdowne, a prominent government frontbencher, his heir sold the property.

The local authority had built an approach road in 1931 which saw the loss of approximately half of the rooms of its greater wing; (Note: The eastern half of the largest range, which formed the eastern wing, is where street Fitzmaurice Place runs today) it is today one of two buildings which open onto Fitzmaurice Place but is known as 9 Fitzmaurice Place. (Note: A street having two numbered/named addresses: 5 and 9) The surviving house was given Grade II* Listed Building status in 1970. The house was also the inspiration for Bingham House in Montreal, built by Lord Shelburne's great friend William Bingham in 1821, who was then the wealthiest man in North America and an associate of Alexander Hamilton.

Notable guests have included Benjamin Franklin, Oscar Wilde, Henry James, and the Comte de Mirabeau, among others.

== Current use ==
The building now houses the Lansdowne Club of Mayfair. It co-serves as an address of Fitzmaurice House Ltd, the International Wine and Food Society which may meet here and The Junior League of London.

== History ==
It was designed by Robert Adam as a house for John Stuart, 3rd Earl of Bute but in 1763 he sold it (one year into its building) to William Petty, 2nd Earl of Shelburne (both men became Prime Minister); the structure was finished in 1768. Adam commissioned the local sculptor Thomas Carter the Younger to carve the chimney-pieces of his design. Shelburne retained Adam until 1771, when his wife died, with parts of the decoration still incomplete. George Dance the Younger (in the 1790s of George III's reign) and Robert Smirke (at the end of his associated Regency) worked on the house.

From 1763 to 1929, it belonged to the seniormost branch of the Petty-FitzMaurice family, elevated from 1784 to a high peerage, as Marquesses of Lansdowne. In 1931, the house, in compensation seeing its extension built to the south-west, saw half of its greater original wing, the east wing, demolished to allow the street Fitzmaurice Place to be built. Since 1935, the residue accommodates the Lansdowne Club.

Winston Churchill commented that in Victorian and Edwardian London, "glittering parties at Lansdowne House, Devonshire House or Stafford House (Lancaster House) comprised all the elements which made a gay and splendid social circle in close relation to the business of Parliament, the hierarchies of the Army and Navy, and the policy of the State".

Its front private garden exceeded its building's footprint but was subject to another's restrictive covenants. Its main front lay further forward and was a garden front to this green expanse (between Berkeley Square and Devonshire House's gardens). This conservation guaranteed for Devonshire House on Piccadilly open aspects (greenery-covered land save for discreet fences/railings) up to and including all of Berkeley Square. These reasons are set out in the Square's article.

In 2022, Blackstone finalized an agreement to redevelop Lansdowne House (the namesake office block at 57 Berkeley Square, opposite the Lansdowne Club; see dispersal of name below) as its European headquarters. Prime Minister Liz Truss called the agreement "a resounding vote of confidence in the United Kingdom as Europe's leading financial centre."

=== Famous residents ===
Owner, resident:

- William Petty, 2nd Earl of Shelburne (later 1st Marquess of Lansdowne), British prime minister (1782–83)

Tenants:

- John Stuart, 3rd Earl of Bute, British prime minister (1762–63)
- William Pitt the Younger, British prime minister (1783–1801, 1804–1806)
- William Waldorf Astor, later 1st Viscount Astor and great-grandfather of the 4th Viscount, widely believed to be the second richest man in the United States at the time (1891–1893)
- Archibald Primrose, 5th Earl of Rosebery, a British Liberal statesman and Prime Minister (1894–1895), and his wife Hannah de Rothschild
- Harry Gordon Selfridge, founder of the Selfridges department store
- Princess Marie Louise of Schleswig-Holstein, a granddaughter of Queen Victoria widely known for her charity work

== Partial demolition and dispersal of name ==
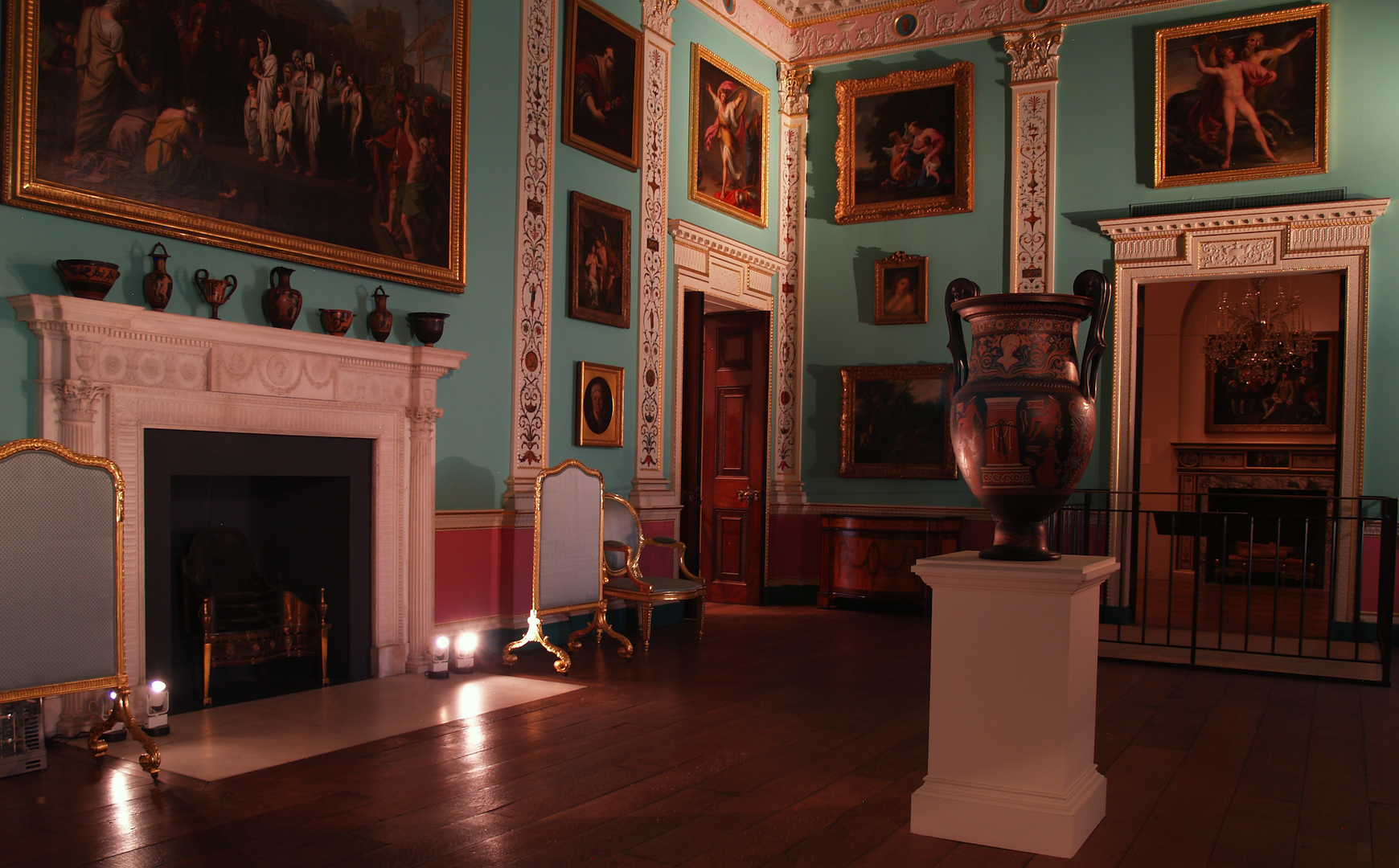
Interior of a drawing room, now installed in the Philadelphia Museum of Art

In the 1930s, the Metropolitan Borough of Westminster Council decided to build a road from Berkeley Square to Curzon Street, which required the demolition of all the garden front rooms of Lansdowne House. One of Adam's three drawing rooms was removed and installed at the Philadelphia Museum of Art, while the Dining Room went to the Metropolitan Museum of Art in New York City. The façade was rebuilt in a modified form at the front of the reduced house; about half of the north-west corner has also been lost.

On 1 May 1935, the Lansdowne Club opened as a "social, residential and athletic Club for members of social standing". It comprises the remaining 18th-century rooms plus a large 1930s extension in the Art Deco style.

Many works of art, such as the Lansdowne Amazon and the Lansdowne Hercules, were also bought by American and British museums. The Lansdowne Hermes resides at the Santa Barbara Museum of Art in California. Other objects moved to Bowood House, the Lansdowne country house, where Adam had also worked, which remains in the family, though large parts of it were demolished in 1956.

A large office block build in 1988, 57 Berkeley Square, with classical fronts and surrounding roads, occupies what was the garden. This still uses as line of its address the name of the old house. What is left of the house, with a 20th-century extension, is now called 9, Fitzmaurice Place.

Extensive renovations began in 2000.

== Gallery ==
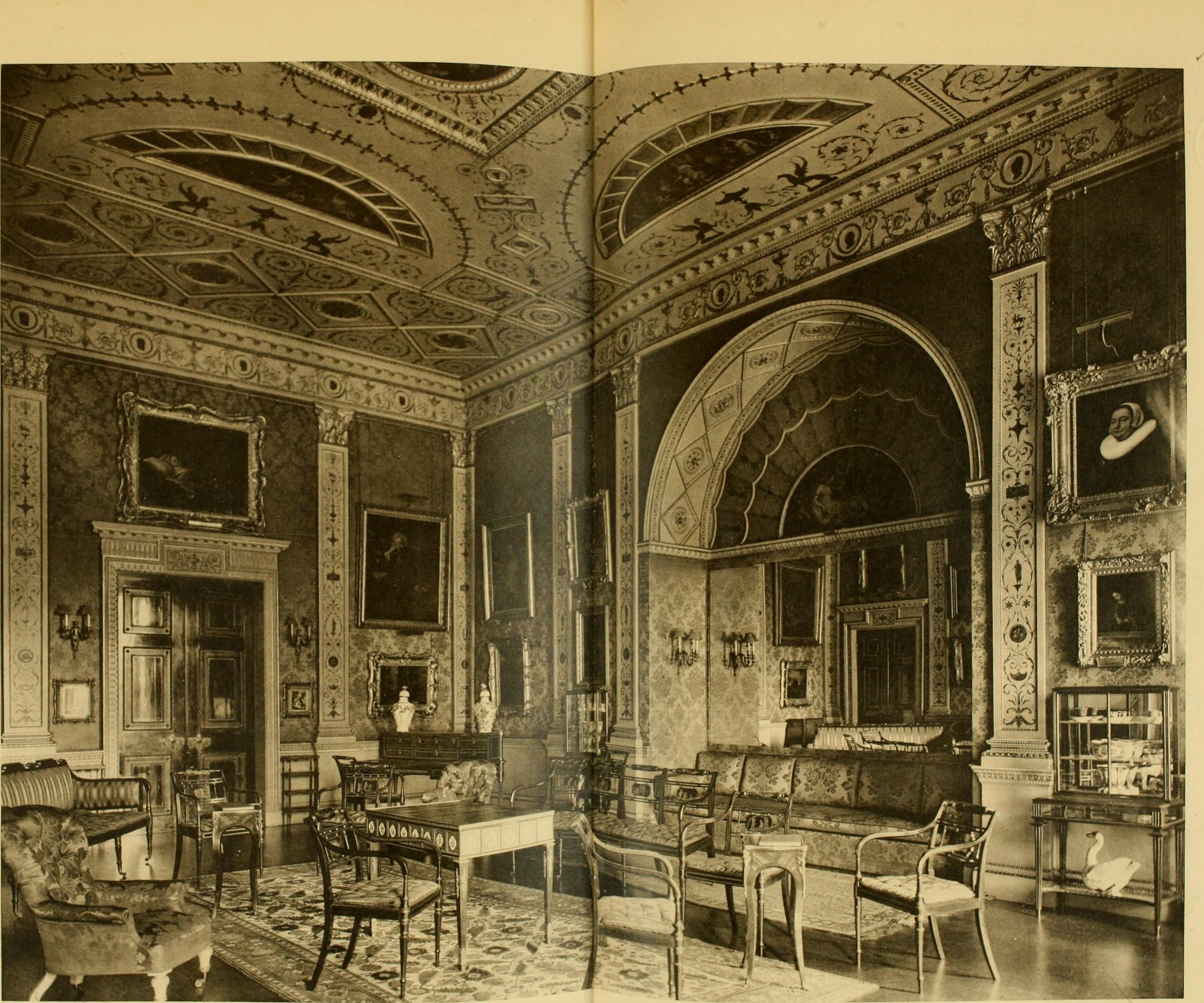
The room now in Philadelphia, before 1915

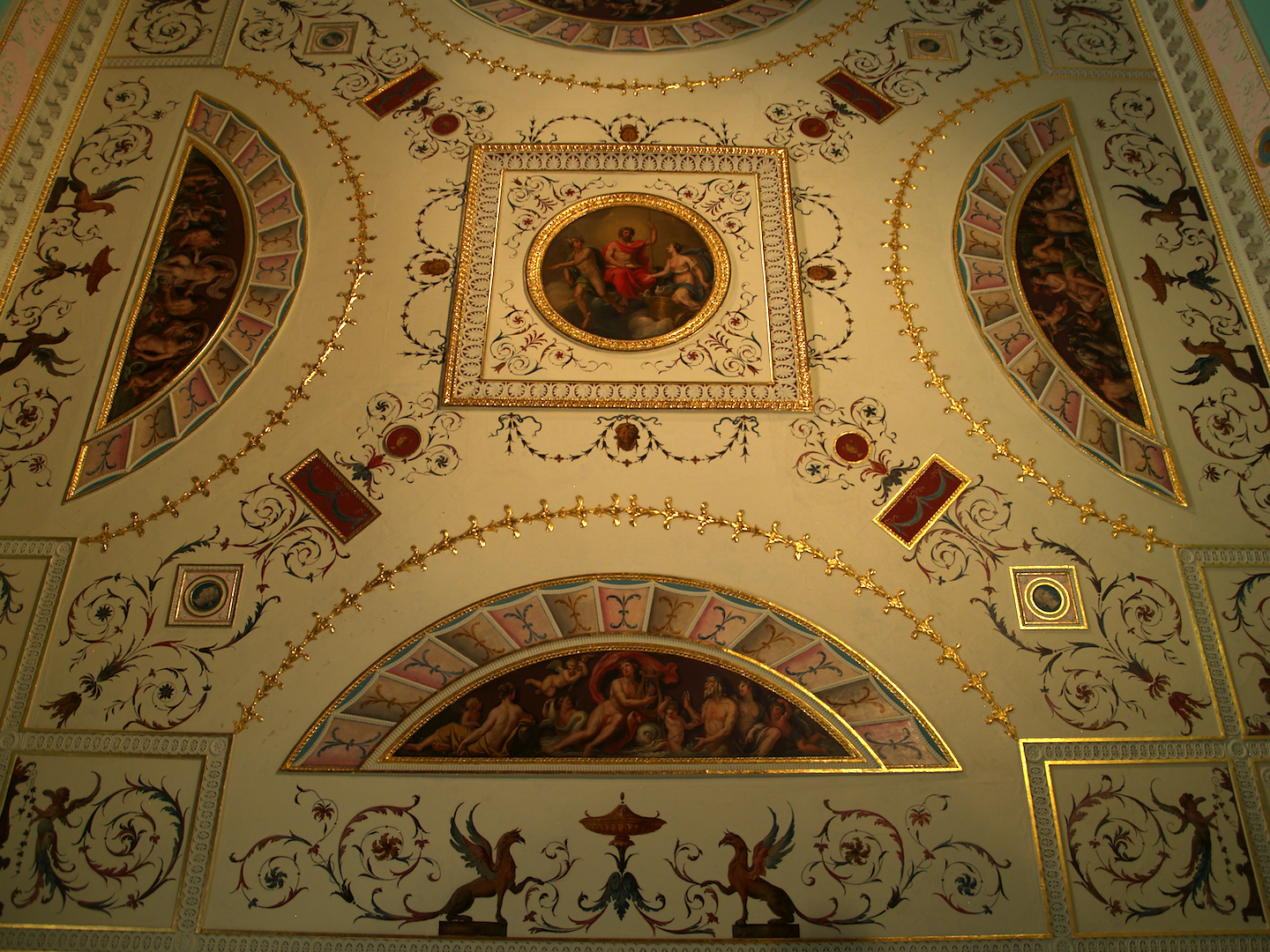
Part of the ceiling now in Philadelphia

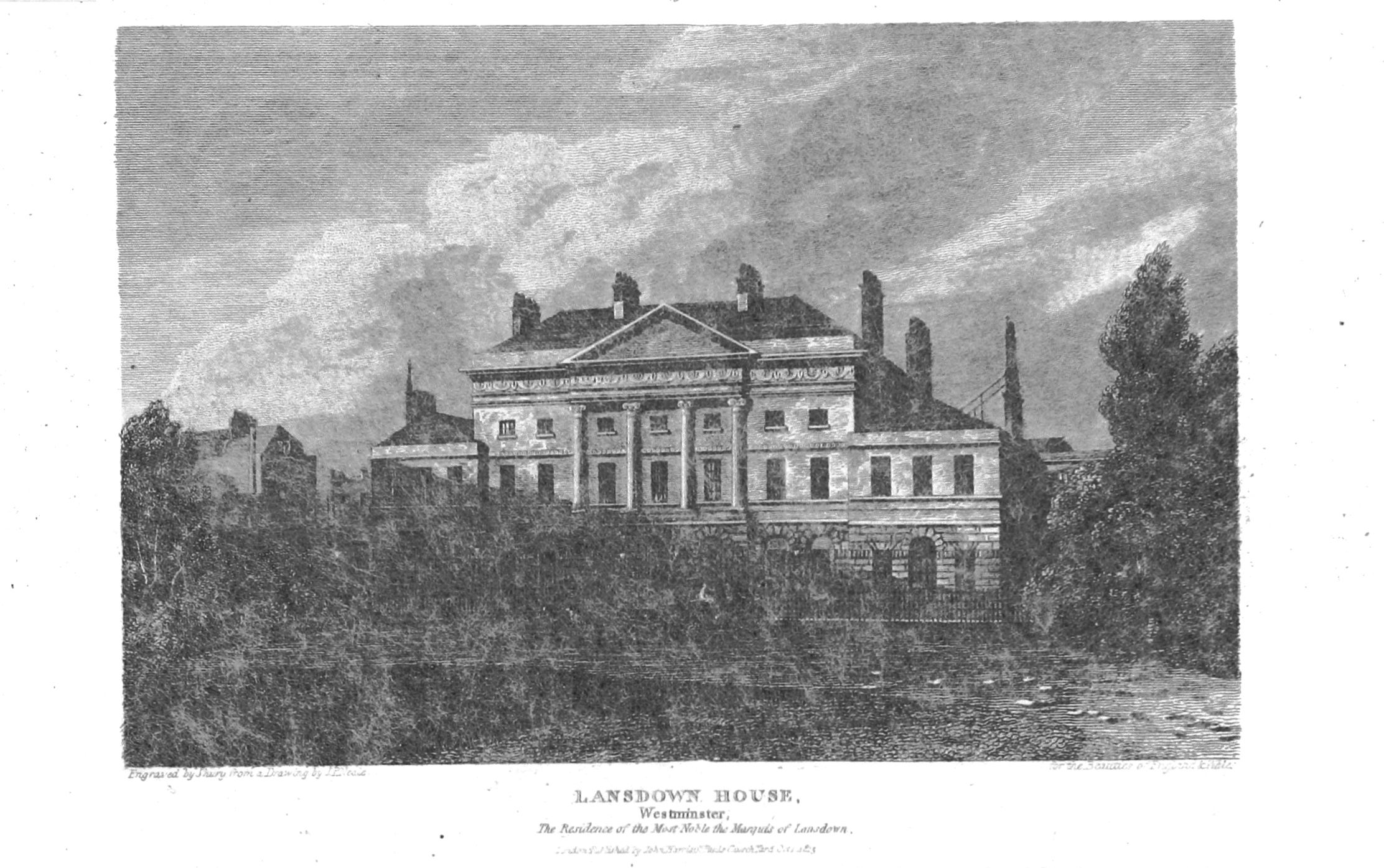
View in 1820

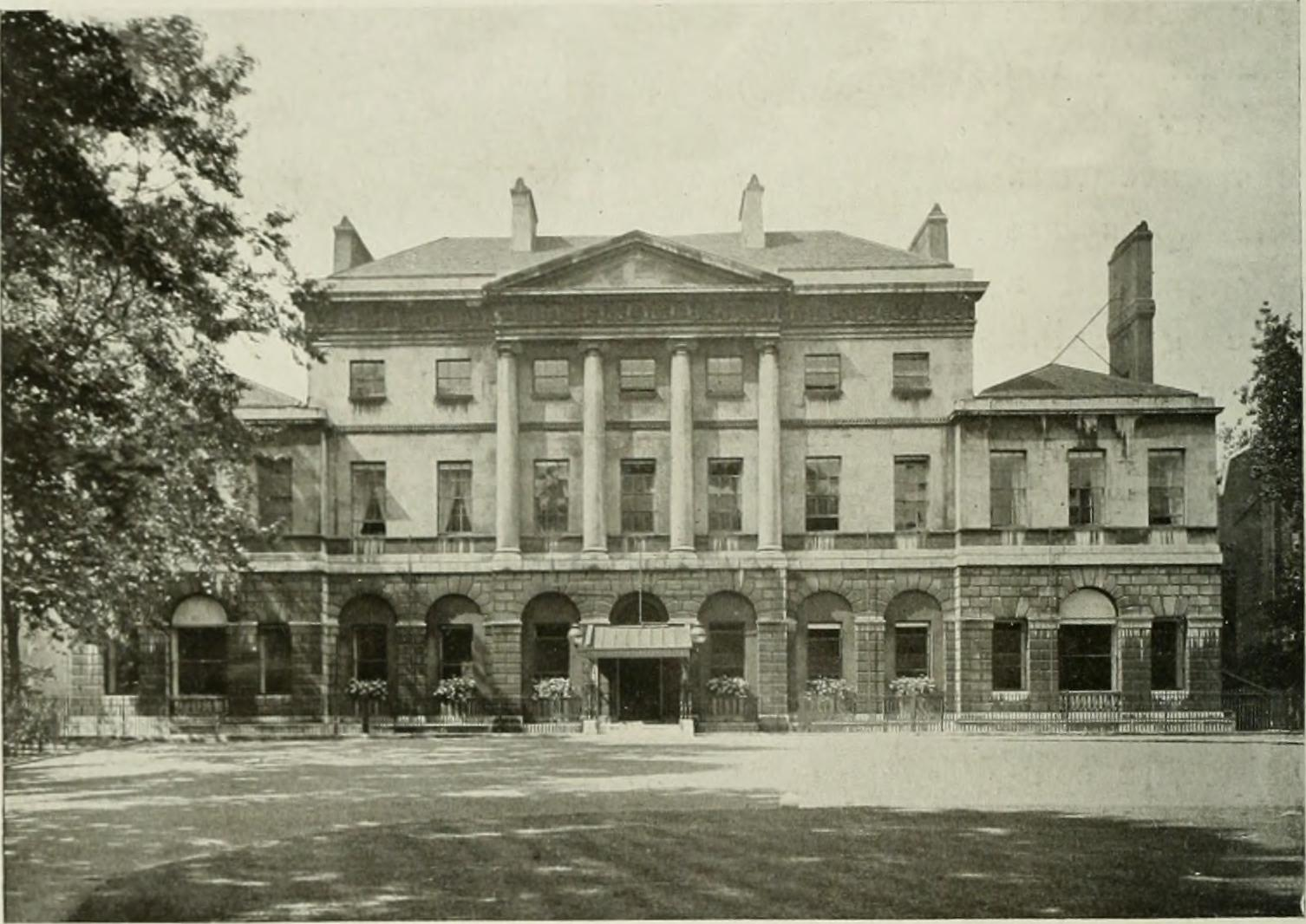
Entrance view

== Notes and references ==
Footnotes

Citations
