= Getty Villa =

Art museum in Los Angeles, California, US

- The Outer Peristyle of the Villa in 2007
- Established: 1954, reopened 2006
- Location: 17985 Pacific Coast Highway, Pacific Palisades, California
- Coordinates: 34°02′42″N 118°33′54″W
- Type: Art museum
- Collection size: 44,000 Greek, Roman, and Etruscan antiquities
- Visitors: 259,000 (2021)
- Director: Timothy Potts
- Public transit access: Los Angeles Metro Bus: 134
- Website: getty.edu/villa

The Getty Villa is an educational center and an art museum located at the easterly end of the Malibu coast in the Pacific Palisades neighborhood of Los Angeles, California, United States. One of two campuses of the J. Paul Getty Museum, the Getty Villa is dedicated to the study of the arts and cultures of ancient Greece, Rome, and Etruria. The collection has 44,000 Greek, Roman, and Etruscan antiquities dating from 6,500 BC to 400 AD, including the Lansdowne Heracles and the Victorious Youth. The UCLA/Getty Master's Program in Archaeological and Ethnographic Conservation is housed on this campus.

== History ==
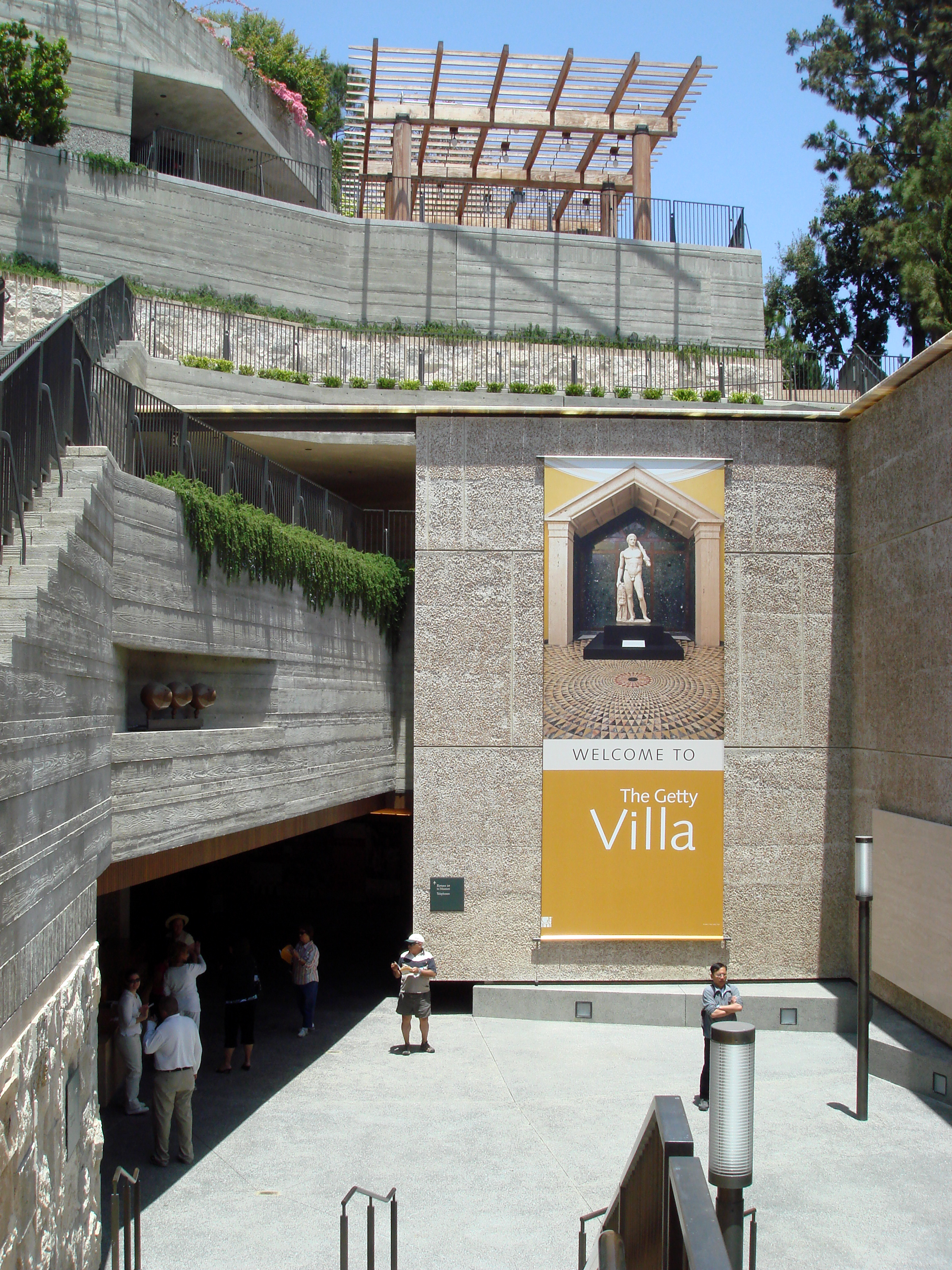
The entrance to the Getty Villa sets the impression of entering an archaeological dig

In 1954, oil tycoon J. Paul Getty opened a gallery adjacent to his home in Pacific Palisades. Quickly running out of room, he built a second museum, the Getty Villa, on the property down the hill from the original gallery. The villa design was inspired by the Villa of the Papyri at Herculaneum and incorporated additional details from several other ancient sites.

It was designed by architects Robert E. Langdon, Jr., and Ernest C. Wilson, Jr., in consultation with archeologist Norman Neuerburg. It opened in 1974, but was never visited by Getty, who died in 1976. Following his death, the museum inherited $661 million, and began planning a much larger campus, the Getty Center, in nearby Brentwood. The museum overcame neighborhood opposition to its new campus plan by agreeing to limit the total size of the development on the Getty Center site. To meet the museum's total space needs, the museum decided to split between the two locations with the Getty Villa housing the Greek, Roman, and Etruscan antiquities.

In 1993, the Getty Trust selected the Boston architects Rodolfo Machado and Jorge Silvetti to design a renovation of the Getty Villa and its campus. In 1997, portions of the museum's collection of Greek, Roman and Etruscan antiquities were moved to the Getty Center for display, and the Getty Villa was closed for renovation. The collection was restored during the renovation.

In 2004, during the renovation, the museum and the University of California, Los Angeles (UCLA), began holding summer institutes in Turkey, studying the conservation of Middle Eastern Art.

Reopened on January 28, 2006, the Getty Villa shows Greek, Roman, and Etruscan antiquities within Roman-inspired architecture and surrounded by Roman-style gardens. The art is arranged by themes, e.g., Gods and Goddesses, Dionysos and the Theater, and Stories of the Trojan War. The new architectural plan surrounding the Villa – which was conceived by Machado and Silvetti Associates (who were also responsible for the plans for the renovated museum) – is designed to simulate an archaeological dig. Architectural Record has praised their work on the Getty Villa as "a near miracle – a museum that elicits no smirks from the art world ... a masterful job ... crafting a sophisticated ensemble of buildings, plazas, and landscaping that finally provides a real home for a relic of another time and place."

In 2016–2018 the collection was reinstalled in a chronological arrangement emphasizing art-historical themes.

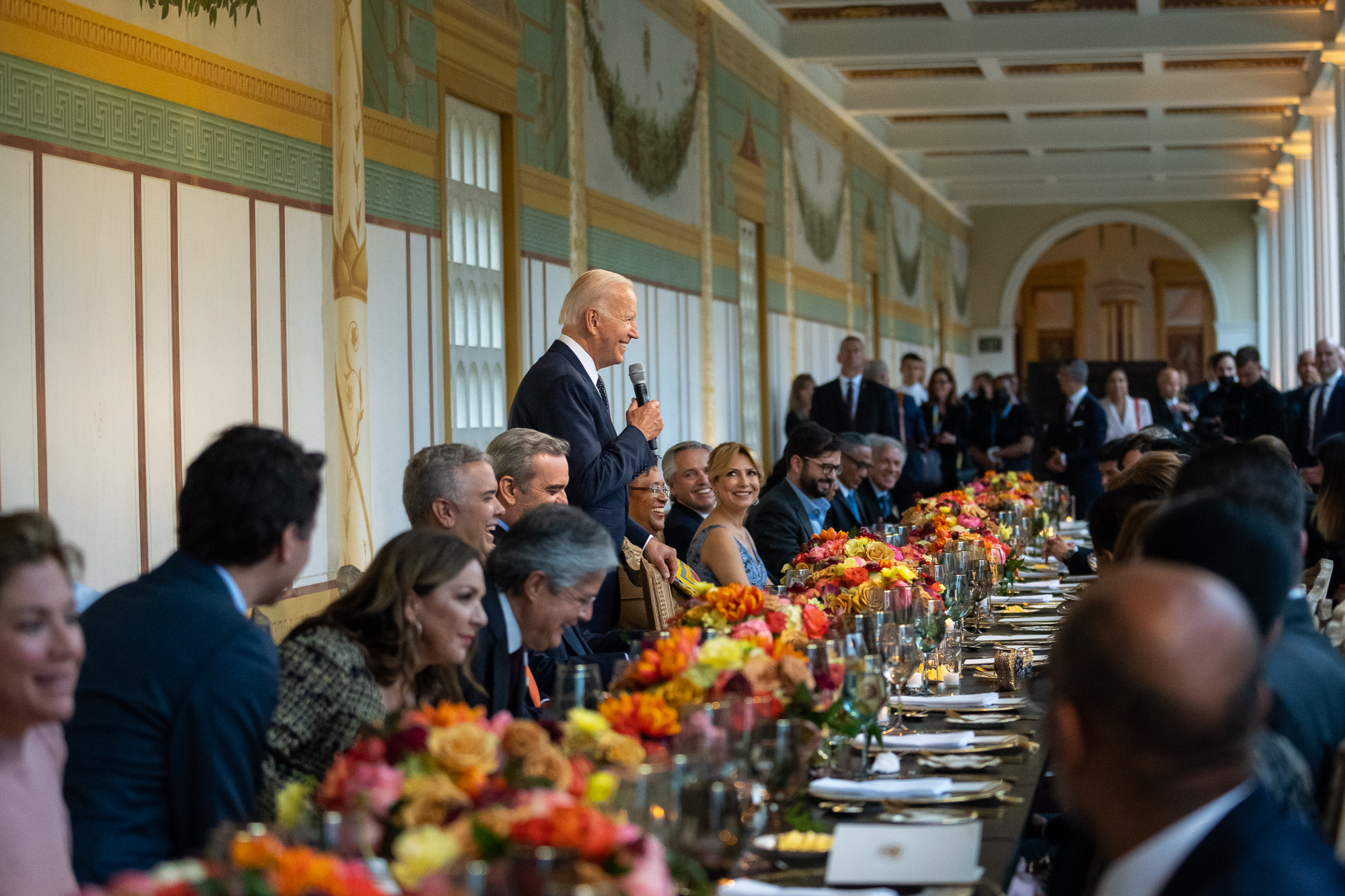
9th Summit of the Americas world leaders dinner hosted at the villa by President Joe Biden in 2022

There has been controversy surrounding the Greek and Italian governments' claim that objects in the collection were looted and should be repatriated. In 2006, the Getty returned or promised to return four looted objects to Greece: a stele (grave marker), a marble relief, a gold funerary wreath, and a marble statue. In 2007, the Getty signed an agreement to return 40 looted items to Italy.

The villa was host to leaders of the Western Hemisphere for dinner, held by President Joe Biden and First Lady Jill Biden in honor of the 9th Summit of the Americas on June 9, 2022, which was a first for the Villa.

On January 7, 2025, the villa's grounds caught fire as a result of the Palisades Fire. No structures or artwork were damaged but roughly 1,400 trees were burned. The Villa reopened on June 27, 2025, following remediation work.

== Facility and programs ==
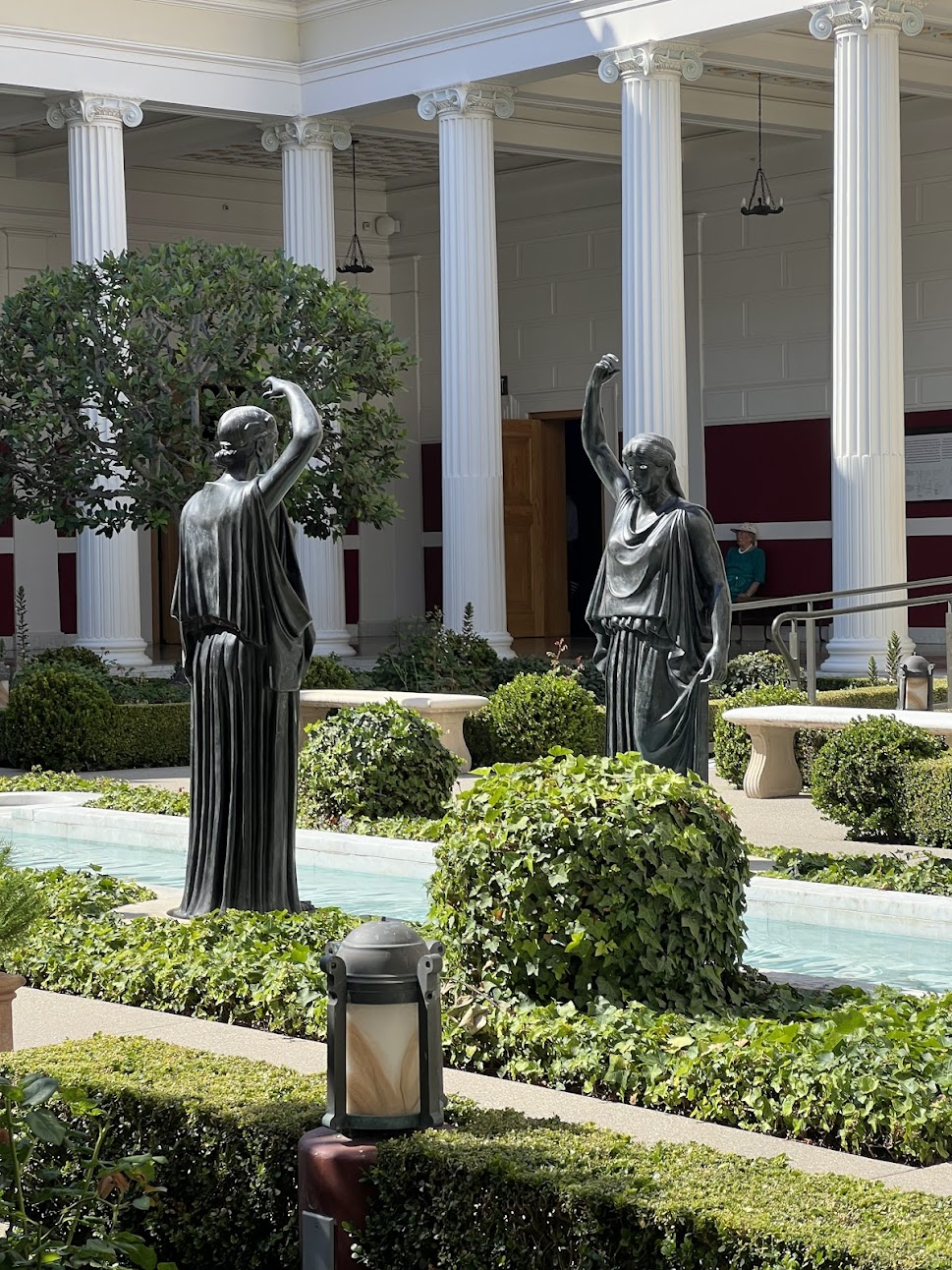
The Inner Peristyle

The Getty Villa hosts live performances in both its indoor auditorium and its outdoor amphitheatre, the Barbara and Lawrence Fleischman Theater. Indoor play-readings included The Trojan Women, Aristophanes' The Frogs, and Euripides' Helen. Indoor musical performances, which typically relate to art exhibits, included: Musica Angelica, De Organographia, and Songs from the Fifth Age: Sones de México in Concert. The auditorium held a public reading of Homer's Iliad.

Outdoor performances included Aristophanes' Peace, Aeschylus's Agamemnon, and Sophocles' Elektra. The Getty Villa hosts visiting exhibitions beyond its own collections. For example, in March 2011, it hosted "In Search of Biblical Lands", a photographic exhibition which included scenes of the Middle East dating back to the 1840s.

The Getty Villa offers special educational programs for children. A special Family Forum gallery offers activities including decorating Greek vases and projecting shadows onto a screen that represents a Greek urn. The room also has polystyrene props from Greek and Roman culture for children to handle and use to cast shadows. The Getty Villa also offers children's guides to the other exhibits.

The Getty Conservation Institute offers a Master's Program in Archaeological and Ethnographic Conservation in association with the Cotsen Institute of Archaeology at UCLA. Classes and research are conducted in the museum wing of the ranch house. The program was the first of its kind in the United States.

== Campus ==
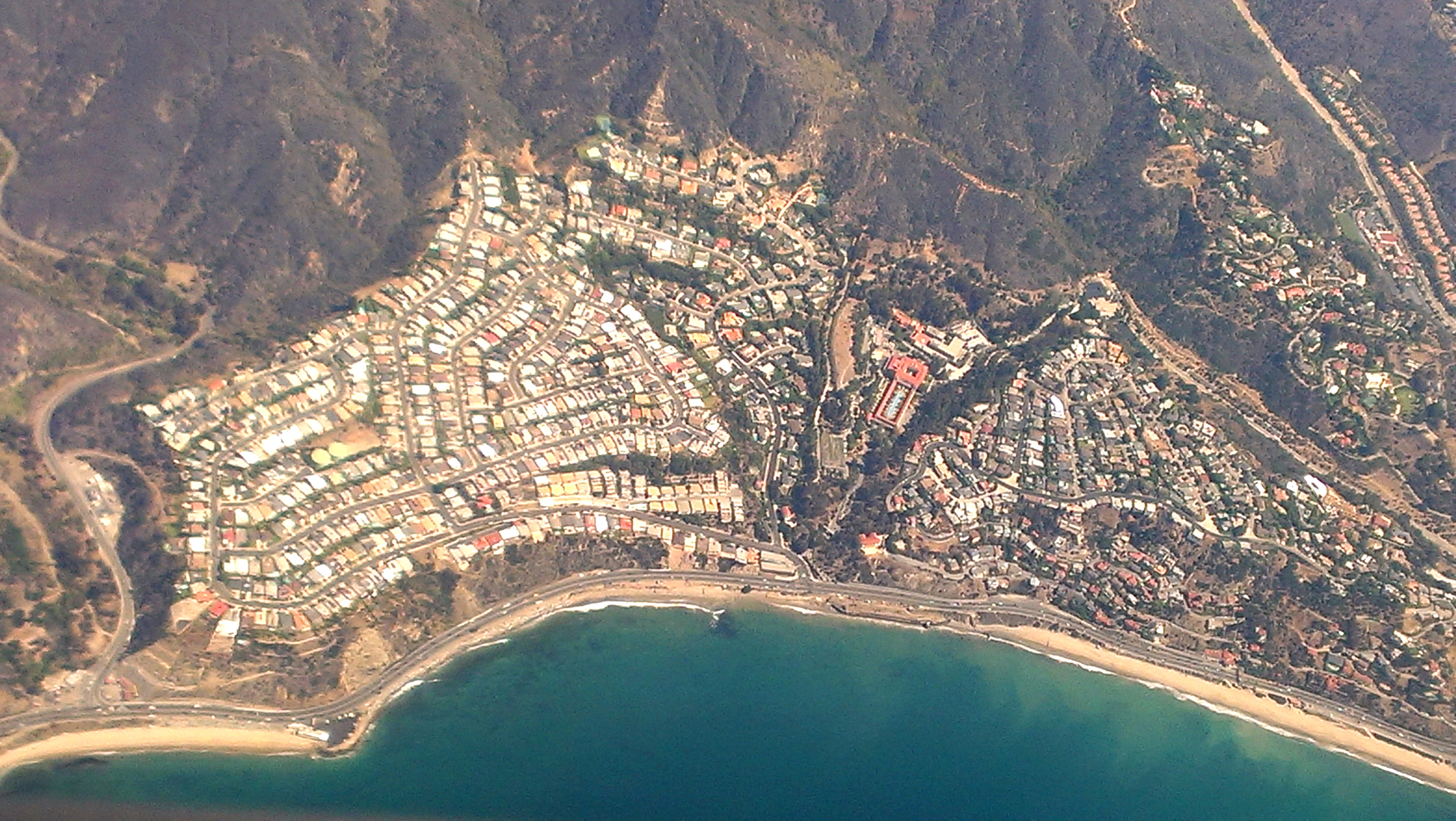
An aerial view of Getty Villa, the building with the red roof at center right, and the surrounding area, before the 2025 fires

While the Getty Villa is located in the Los Angeles neighborhood of Pacific Palisades, it self-identifies with the city of Malibu, as it is located just east of that city's limits. The 64 acres (26 ha) museum complex sits on a hill overlooking the Pacific Ocean, which is about 100 yards (91 m) from the entrance to the property. An outdoor 2,500-square-foot (230 m^{2}) entry pavilion is also built into the hill near the 248-car, four story, South Parking garage at the southern end of the Outer Peristyle.

To the west of the Museum is the 450-seat Barbara and Lawrence Fleischman Theater, where outdoor evening performances are staged. The theater faces the west side of the Villa and uses its entrance as a stage. To the northwest of the theatre is a three-story, 15,500-square-foot (1,440 m^{2}) building built into the hill that contains the museum store on the lower level, a cafe on the second level, and a private dining room on the top level. North of the Villa is a 10,000 sq ft (930 m^{2}) indoor 250-seat auditorium. On the hill above the museum are Getty's original private ranch house and the museum wing that Getty added to his home in 1954. They are now used for curatorial offices, meeting rooms and as a library.

Although not open to the public, the campus includes J. Paul Getty's grave on the hill behind his ranch house.

A 200-car North Parking Garage is behind the ranch complex. The 105,500-square-foot (9,800 m^{2}) museum building is arranged in a square opening into the Inner Peristyle courtyard. The 2006 museum renovation added 58 windows facing the Inner Peristyle and a retractable skylight over the atrium. It replaced the terrazzo floors in the galleries and added seismic protection with new steel reinforcing beams and new isolators in the bases of statues and display cases. The museum has 48,000 sq ft (4,500 m^{2}) of gallery space.

Writing in 2008, the architectural critic Calum Storrie described the overall effect:

What the Getty Villa achieves, first by seclusion, then by control of access, and ultimately through the architecture, is a sense of detachment from its immediate environment.

=== Gardens ===
There are four different gardens on the grounds of the Getty Villa, with plants native to the Mediterranean and known to have been cultivated by the ancient Romans. The largest garden is the Outer Peristyle, an exact proportional replica of the one at the Villa dei Papiri. The garden is 308 by 105 feet (94 m × 32 m), with a 220 feet (67 m) long pool at the center. Traditional Roman landscaping designs are replicated with manicured bay laurel, boxwood, oleander, and viburnum shrubs. There are rows of date palms lining each of the long sides of the Outer Peristyle garden. Each corner features pomegranate trees surrounded by ornamental plants like acanthus, ivy, hellebore, lavender, and iris. Copies of Roman bronzes excavated at the Villa dei Papiri and elsewhere are scattered throughout the garden.

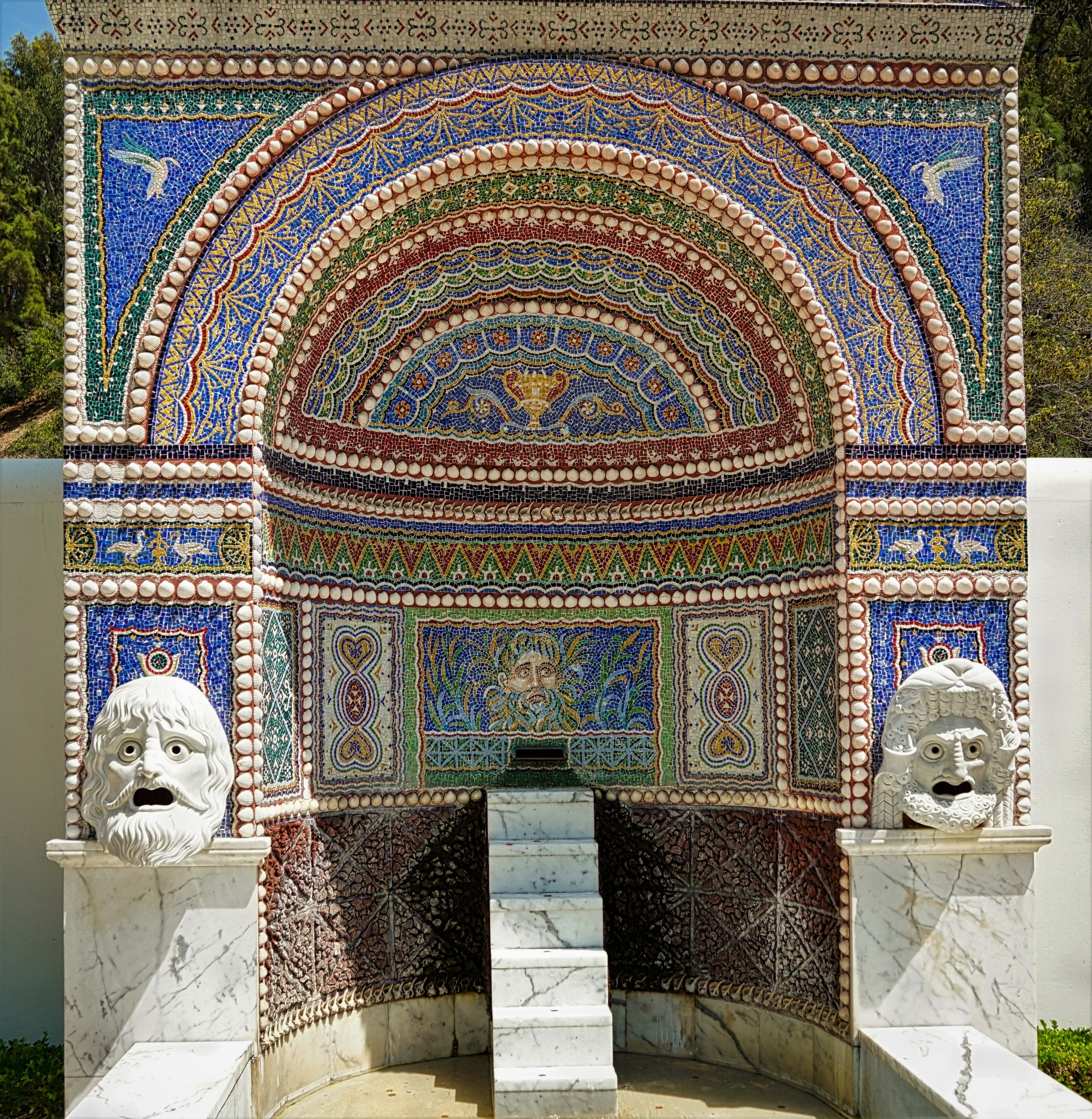
Mosaic Fountain

Just west of the Outer Peristyle is the Herb Garden, where traditional herbs sourced from ancient Roman texts are cultivated along with a variety of fruit trees: pomegranate, fig, apricot, apple, citrus, and pear. The garden is surrounded by grapevines, and bounded by an olive grove planted on terraces above the garden. The East Garden is small and secluded, surrounded by laurel and plane trees. Its chief feature is an exact replica of the famous shell and mosaic fountain at the House of the Great Fountain in Pompeii, but there is also a circular fountain at the center of a basin filled with aquatic plants, around which the garden is oriented.

The fourth and final garden is the Inner Peristyle. Like the Outer Peristyle, a long, narrow, marble lined pool forms the centerpiece of the landscaping. Along each side are replicas of bronze female statues from the Villa dei Papiri, modelled to appear as if they are drawing water from the pool. In each corner of the garden is a replica white marble fountain, and there are several bronze copies of famous Greek sculptures like the Doryphoros and busts of Greek philosophers like Pythagoras and Democritus.

== Collection ==
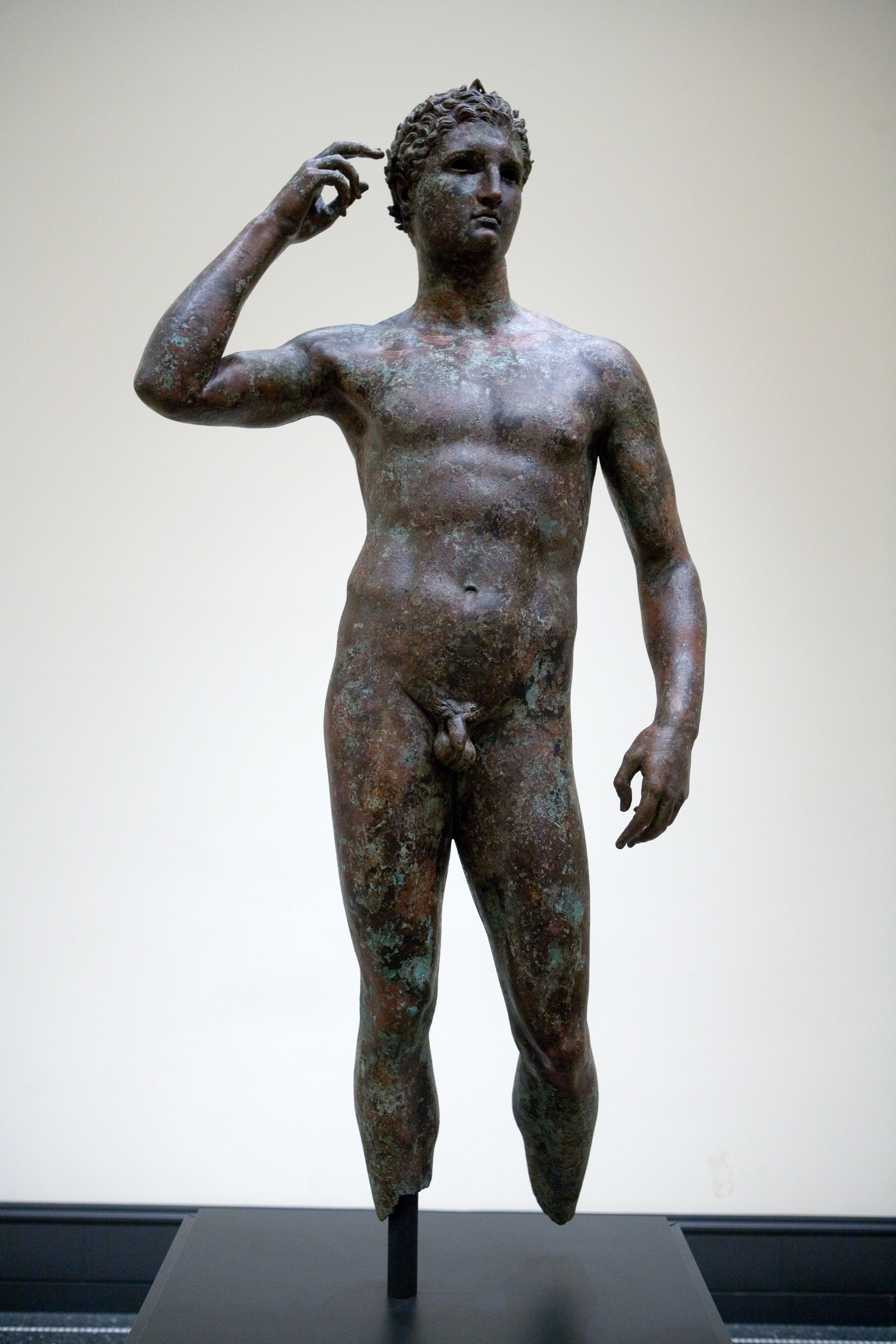
Victorious Youth, part of the museum's collection

The collection has 44,000 Greek, Roman, and Etruscan antiquities dating from 6,500 BC to 400 AD, of which approximately 1,400 are on view.

Among the outstanding items is Victorious Youth, one of few life-size Greek bronze statues to have survived to modern times. The Lansdowne Heracles is a Hadrianic Roman sculpture in the manner of Lysippus. The Villa has jewelry and coin collections and an extensive 20,000 volume library of books covering art from these periods.

The Villa displays the Getty kouros, which the museum lists as "Greek, about 530 B.C., or modern forgery" because scientific analysis is inconclusive as to whether the marble statue can be dated to Greek times. If genuine, the Getty kouros is one of only twelve remaining intact lifesize kouroi. The Marbury Hall Zeus is an 81 in (2.1 m) tall marble statue that was recovered from ruins at Tivoli near Rome.

== Gallery ==
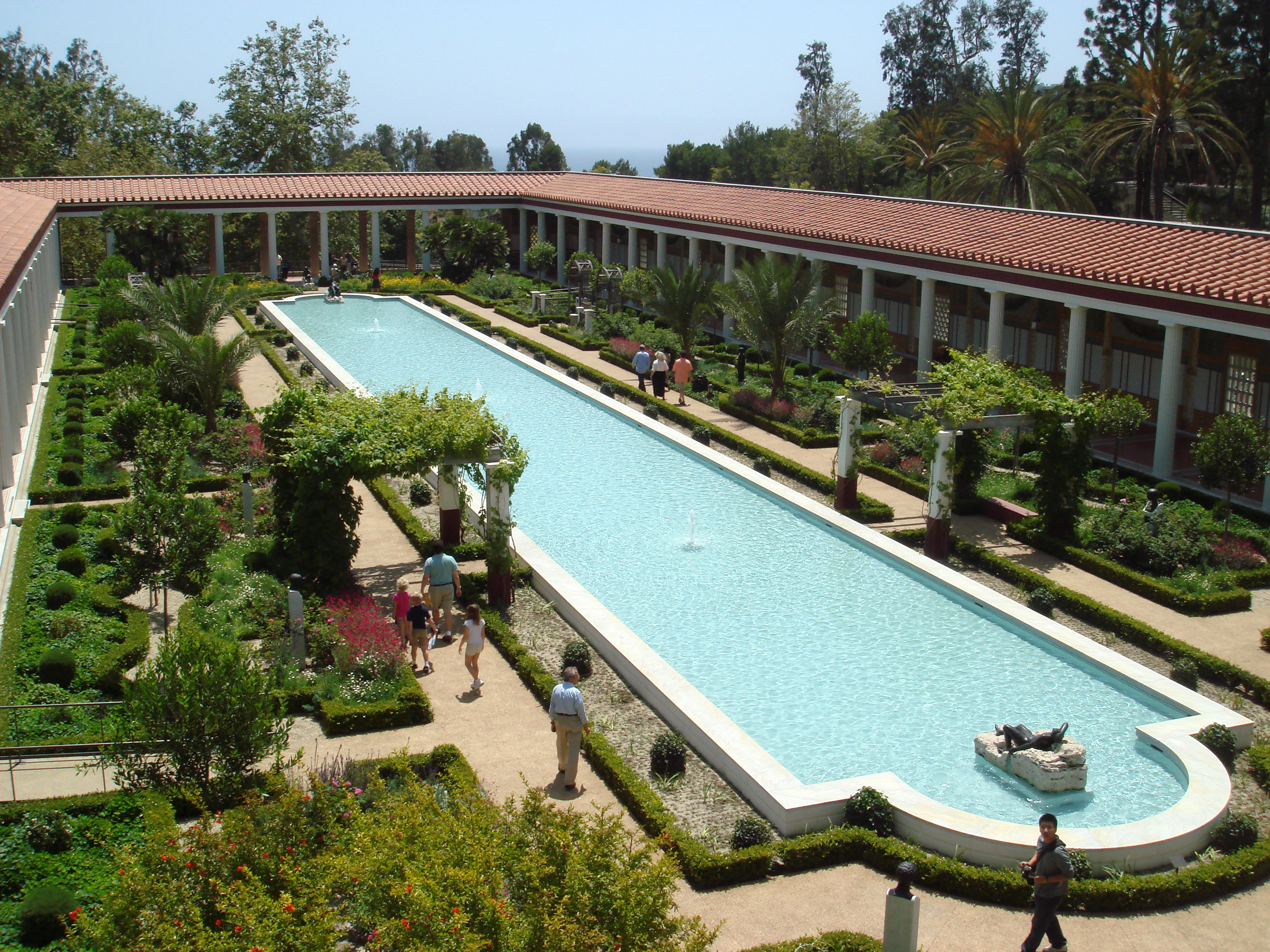
Outer Peristyle

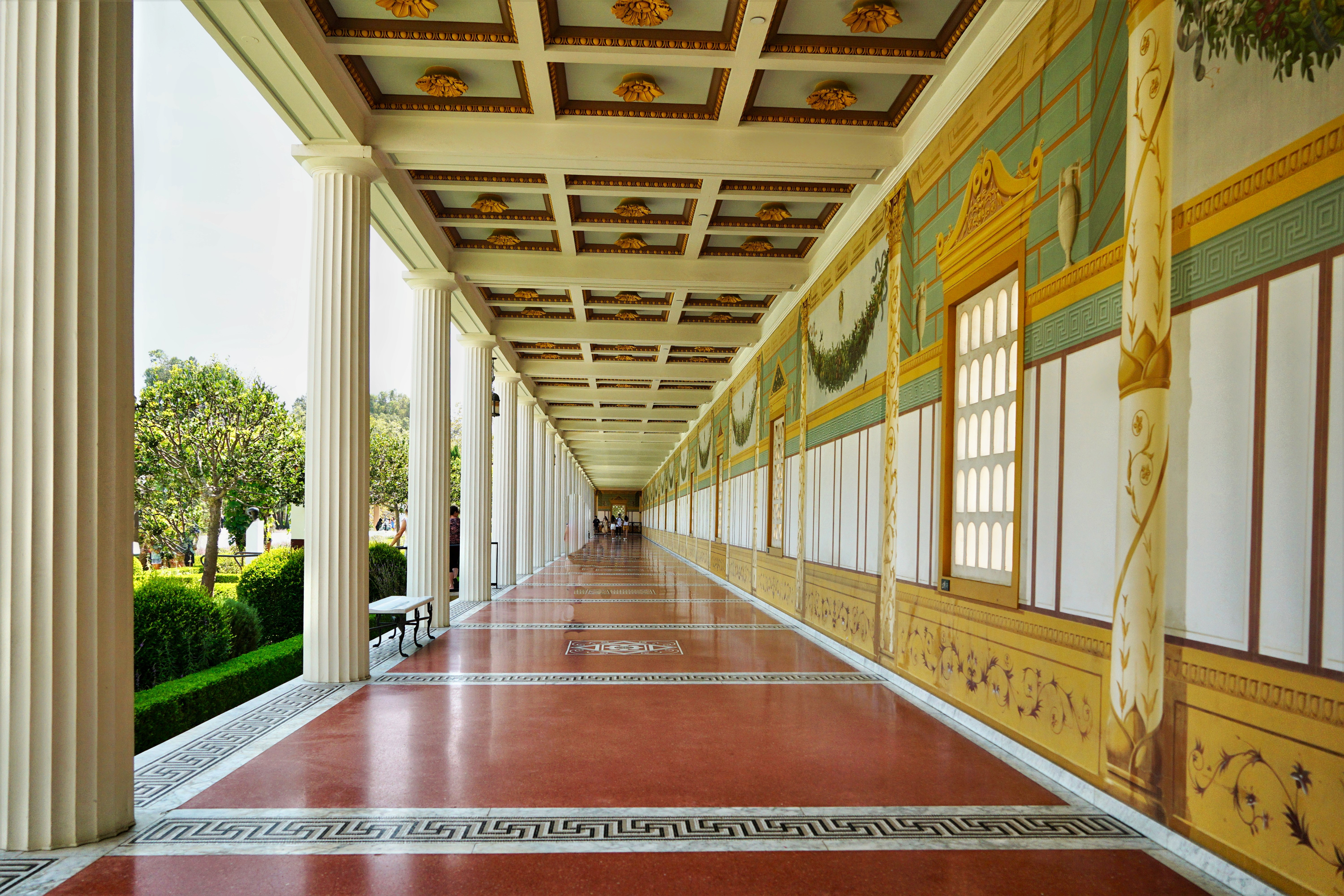
Outer Peristyle – architectural detail

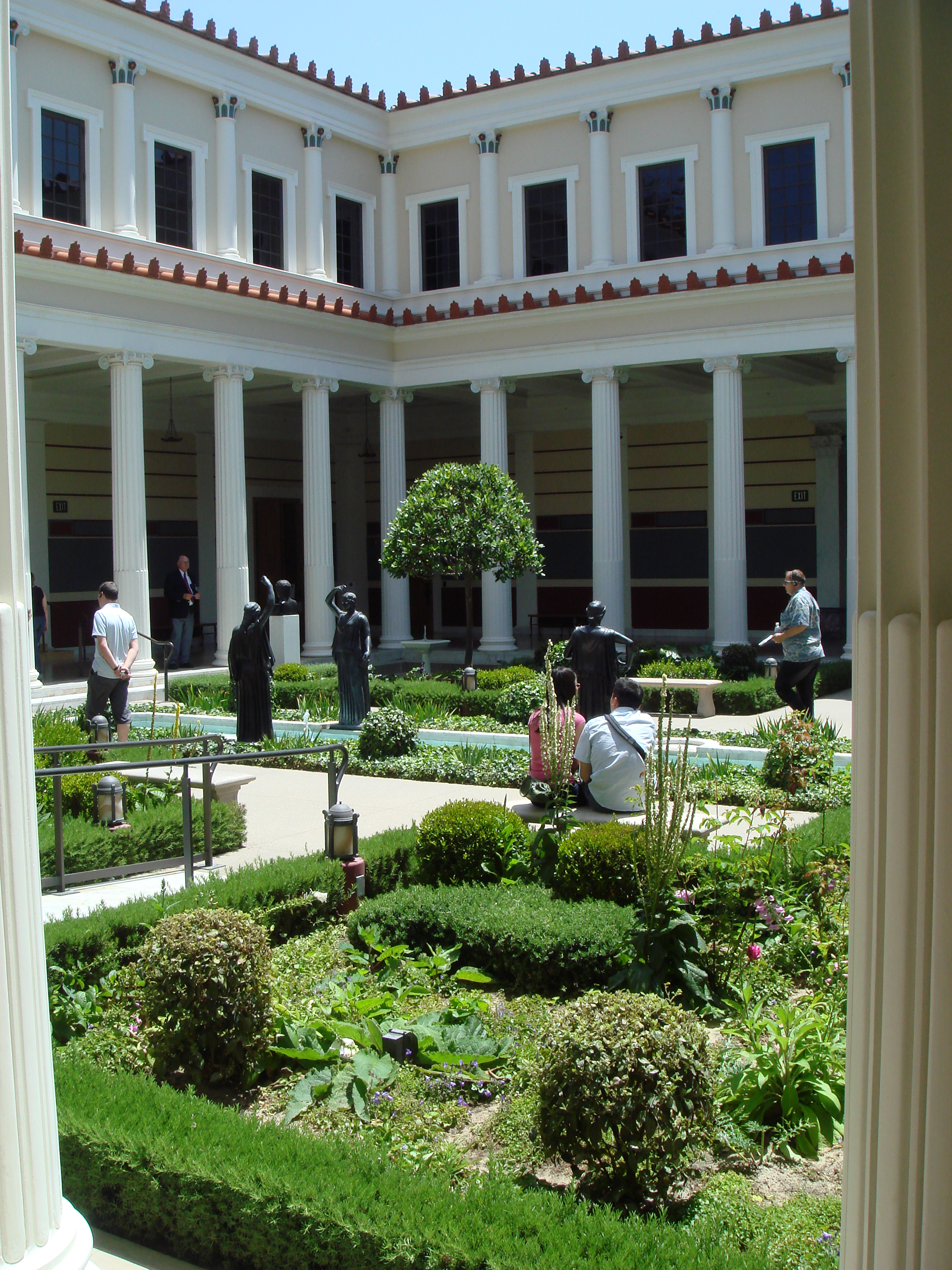
Inner Peristyle

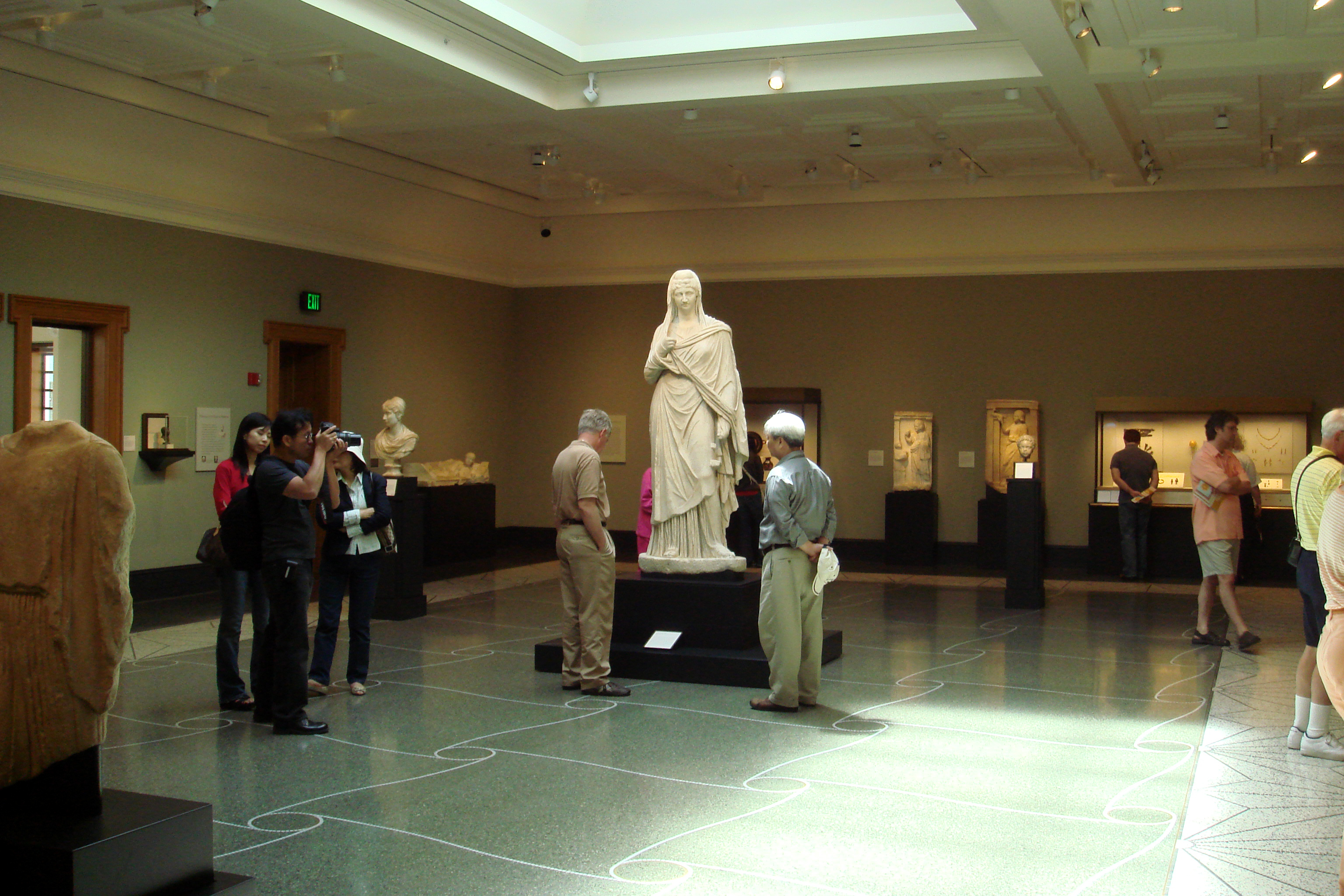
Gallery within the Villa

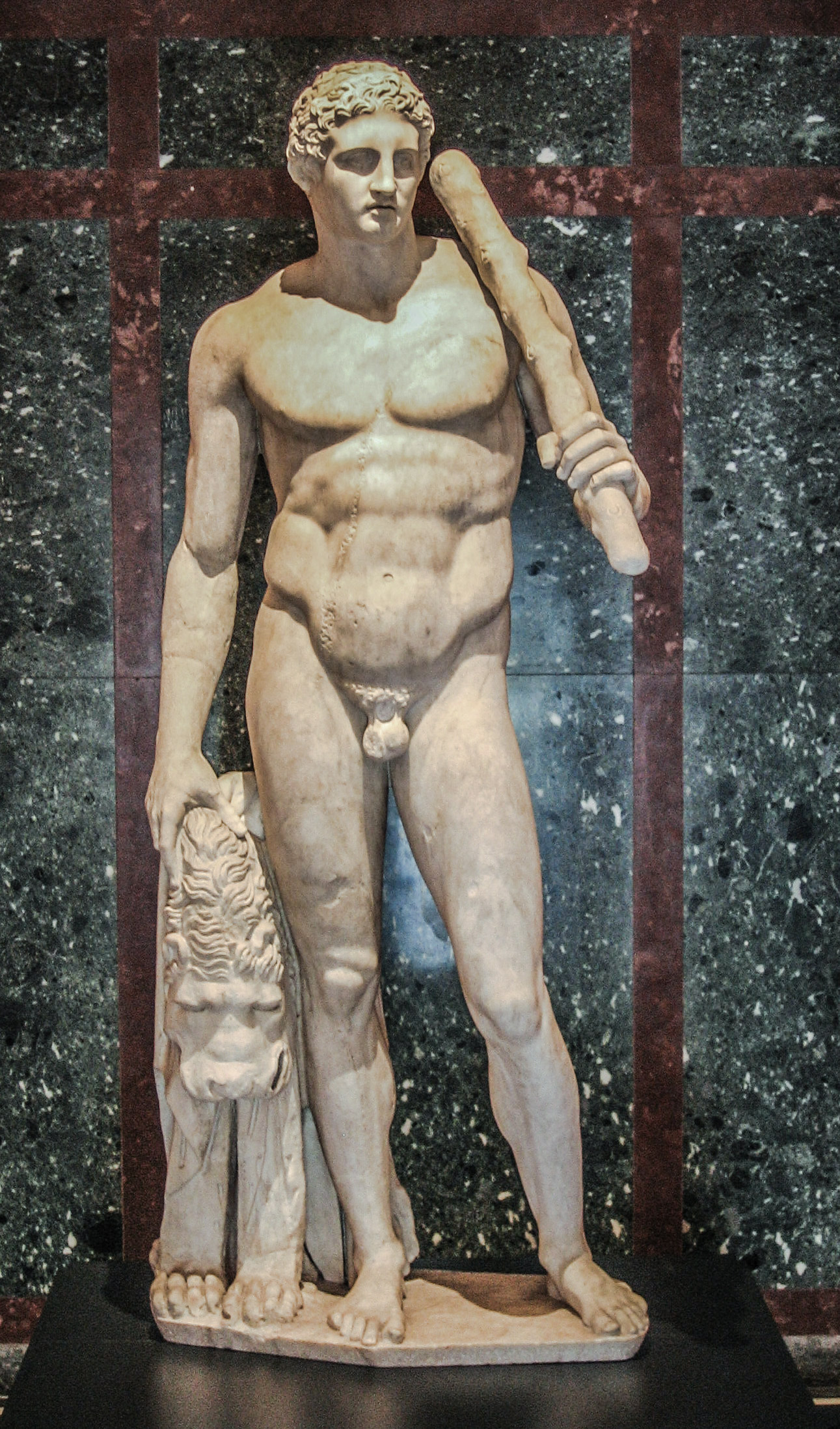
The Lansdowne Herakles, part of the museum's collection

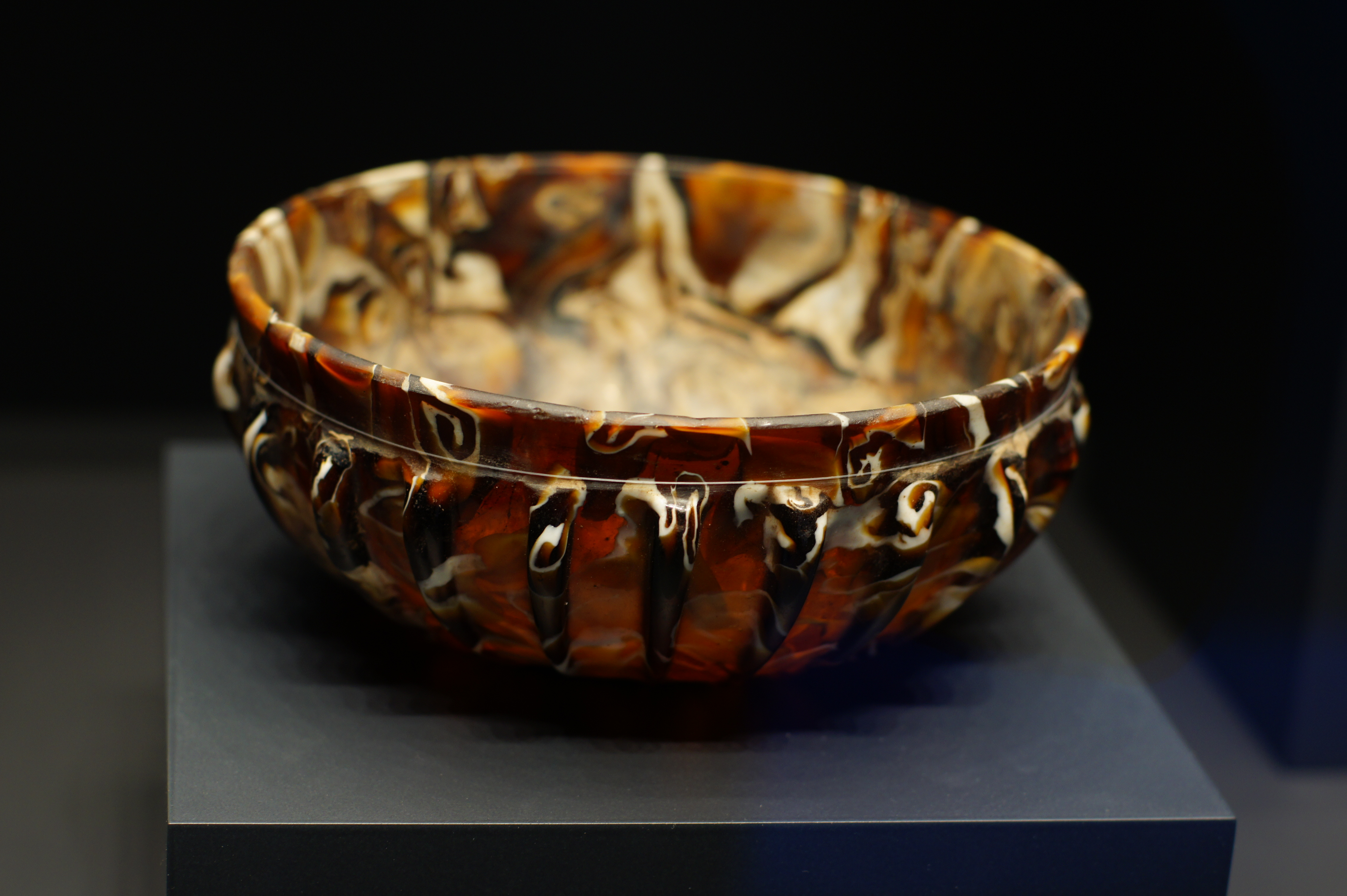
Ancient Roman glassware in the Getty Villa

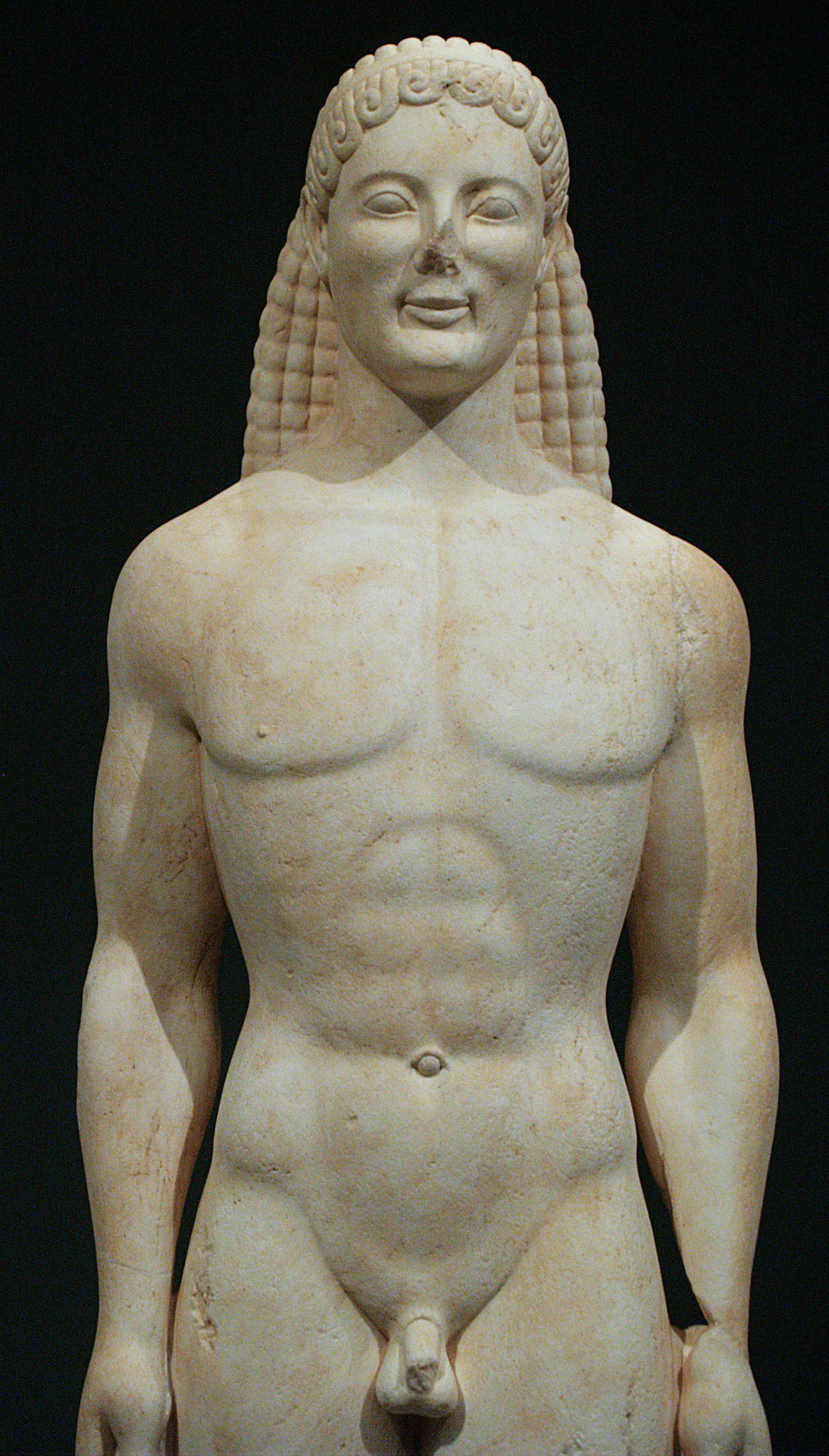
Getty kouros, part of the museum's collection

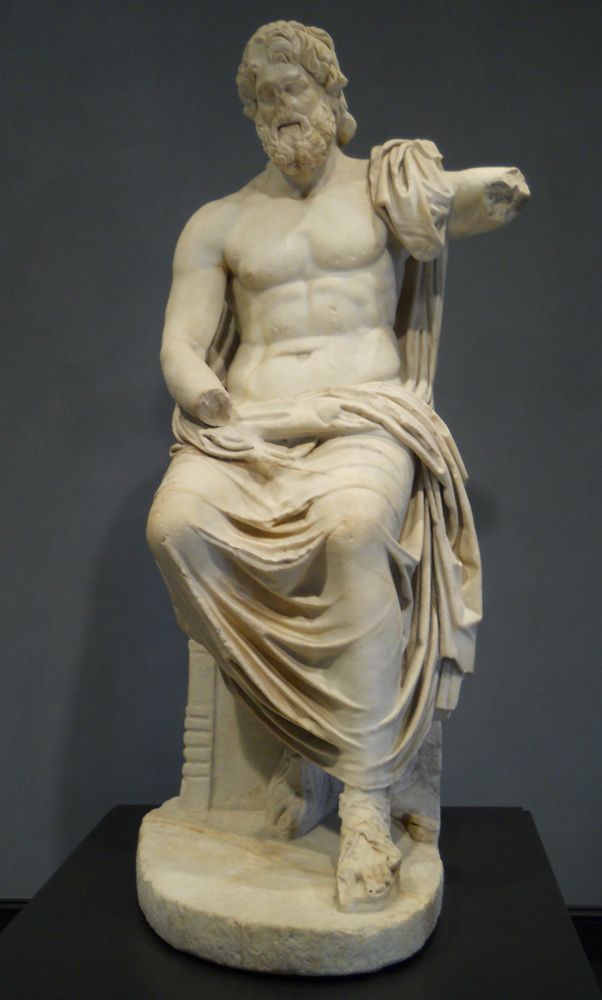
Marbury Hall Zeus, King of the Gods, at the Getty Villa

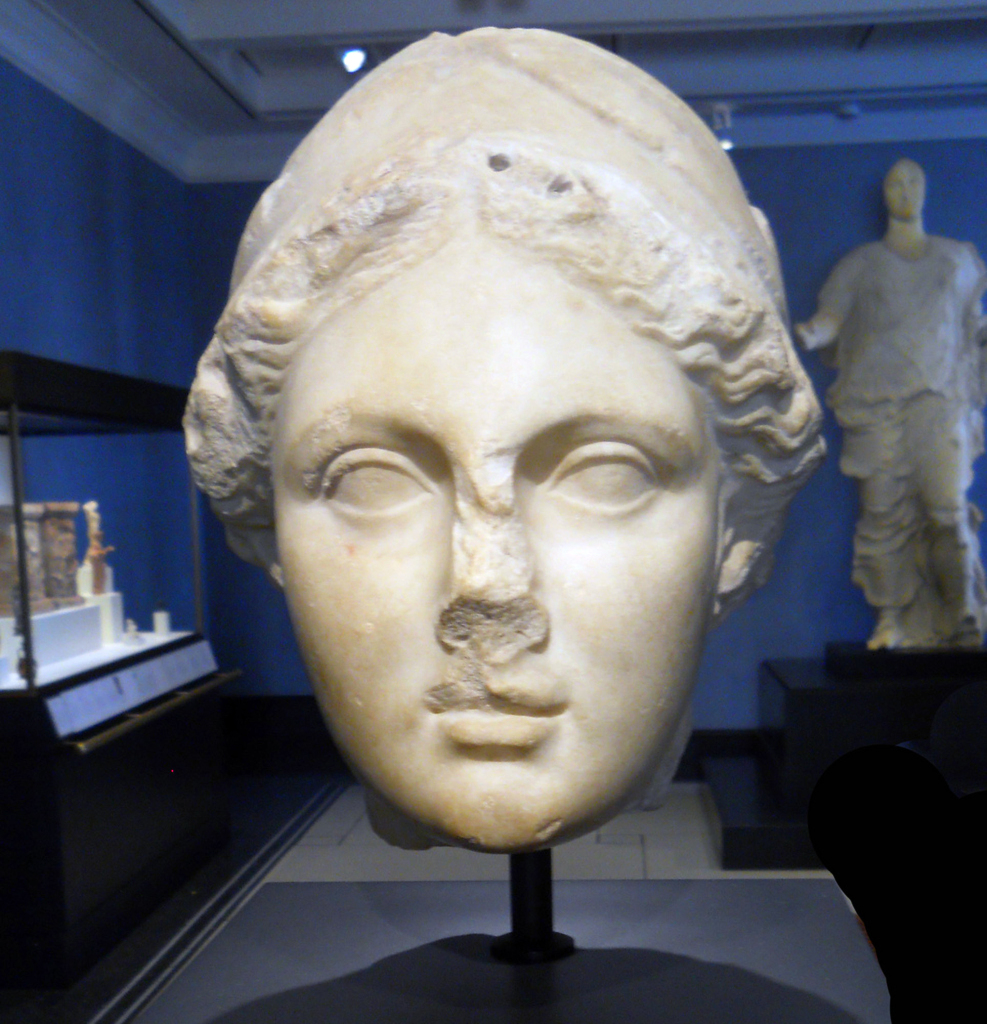
Athena, Goddess of war, civilization, wisdom, strength, strategy, crafts, justice and skill

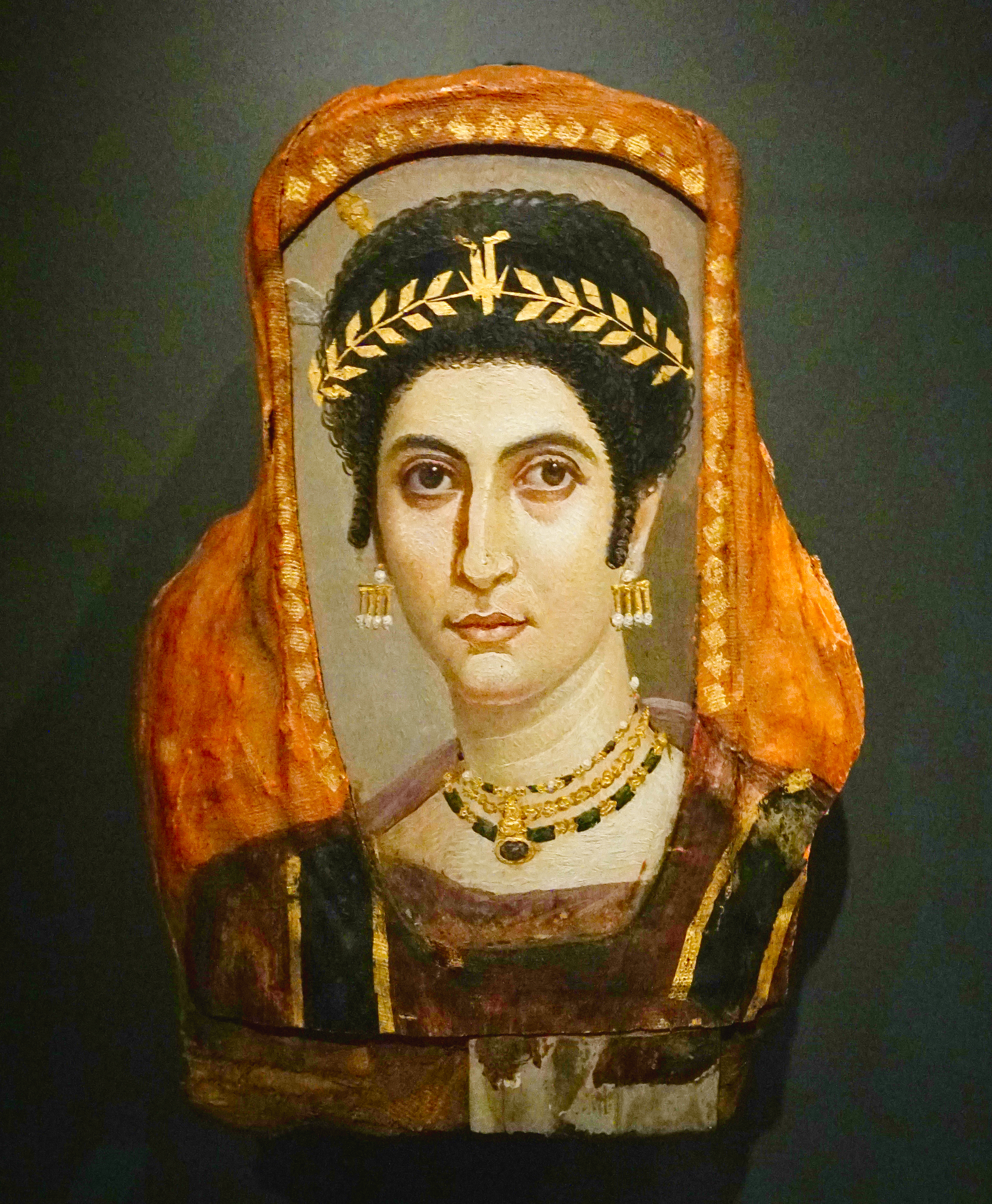
Roman-Egyptian Female Mummy Portrait

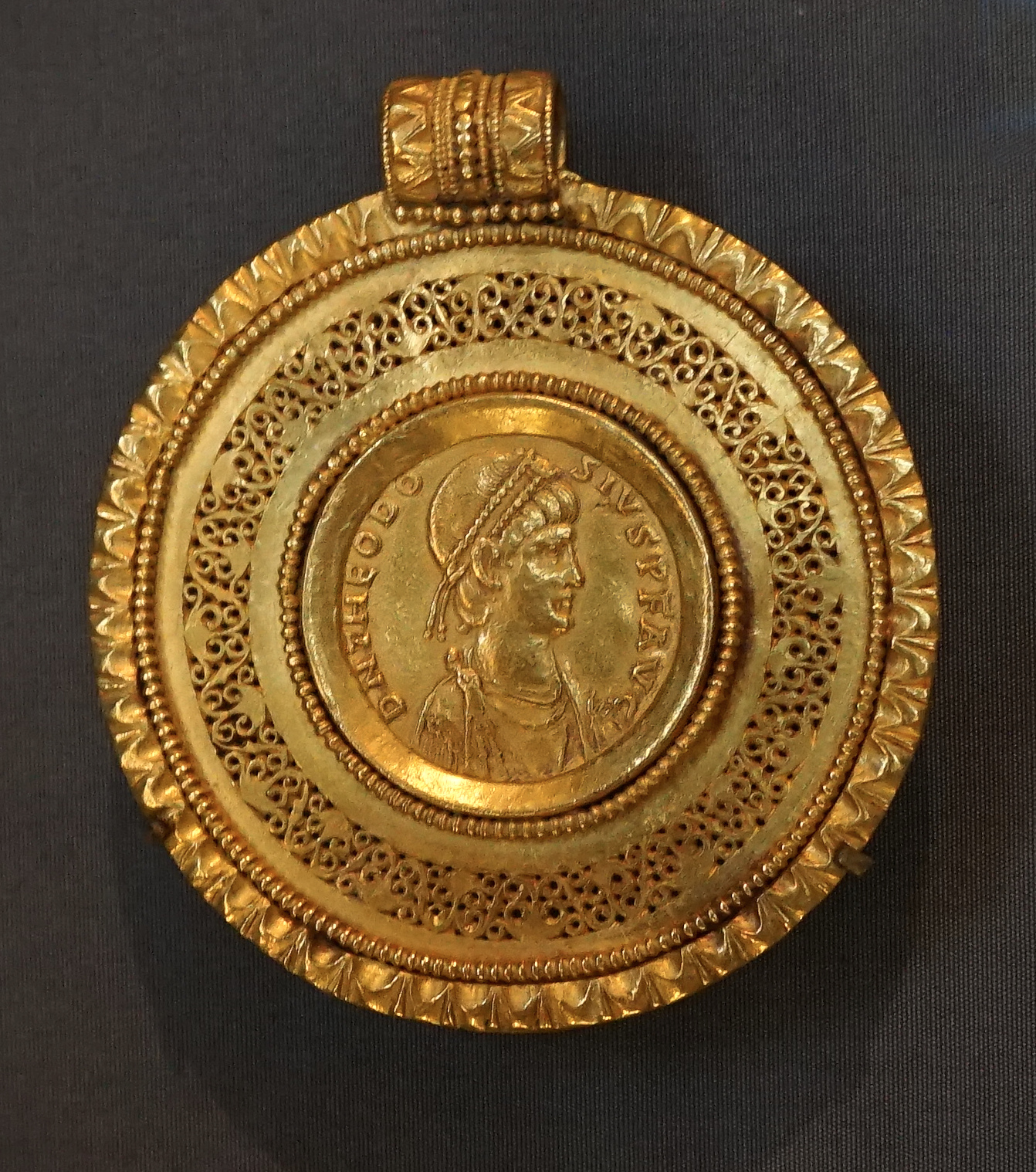
Roman gold medallion

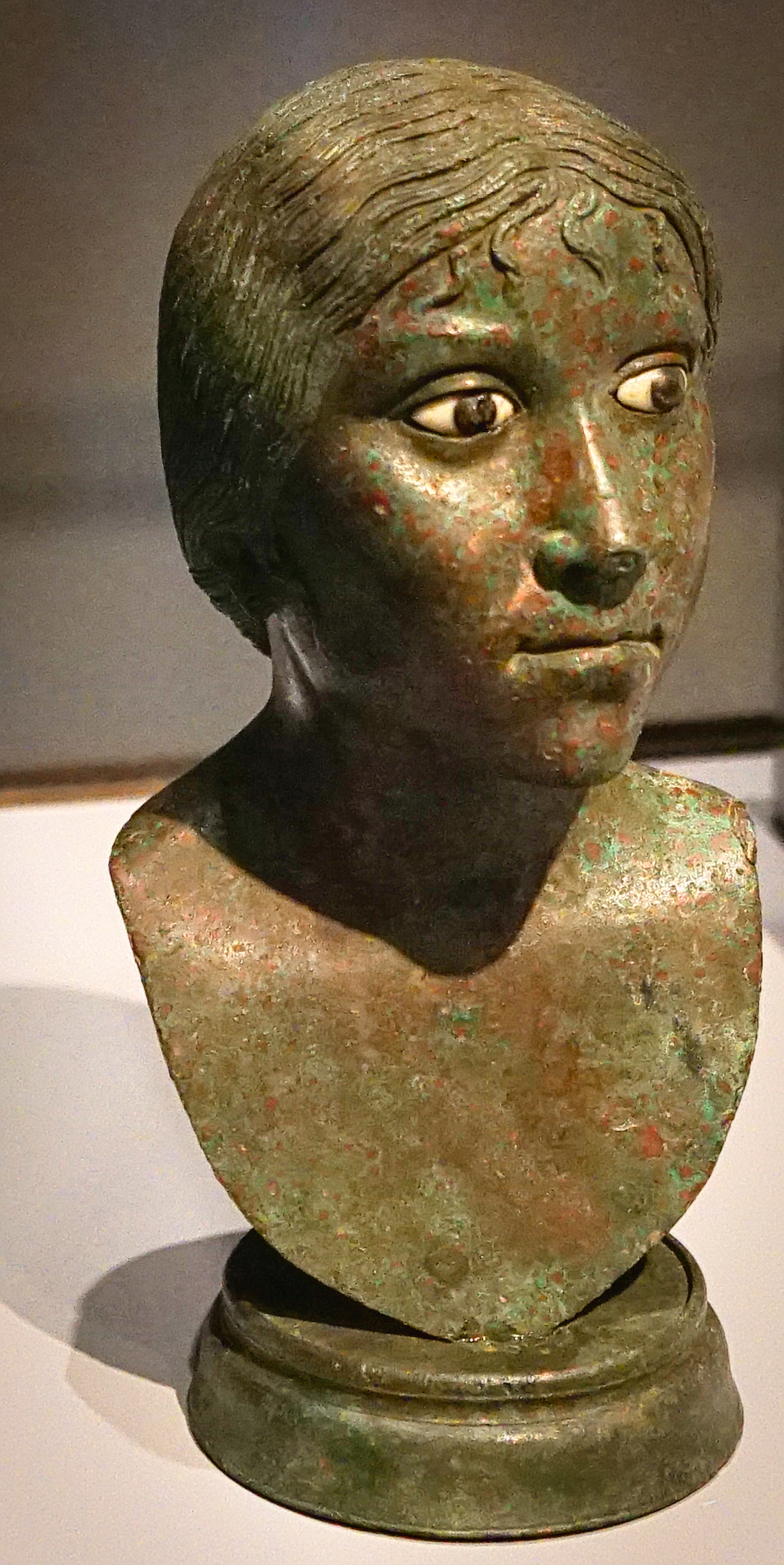
Roman bronze statuette

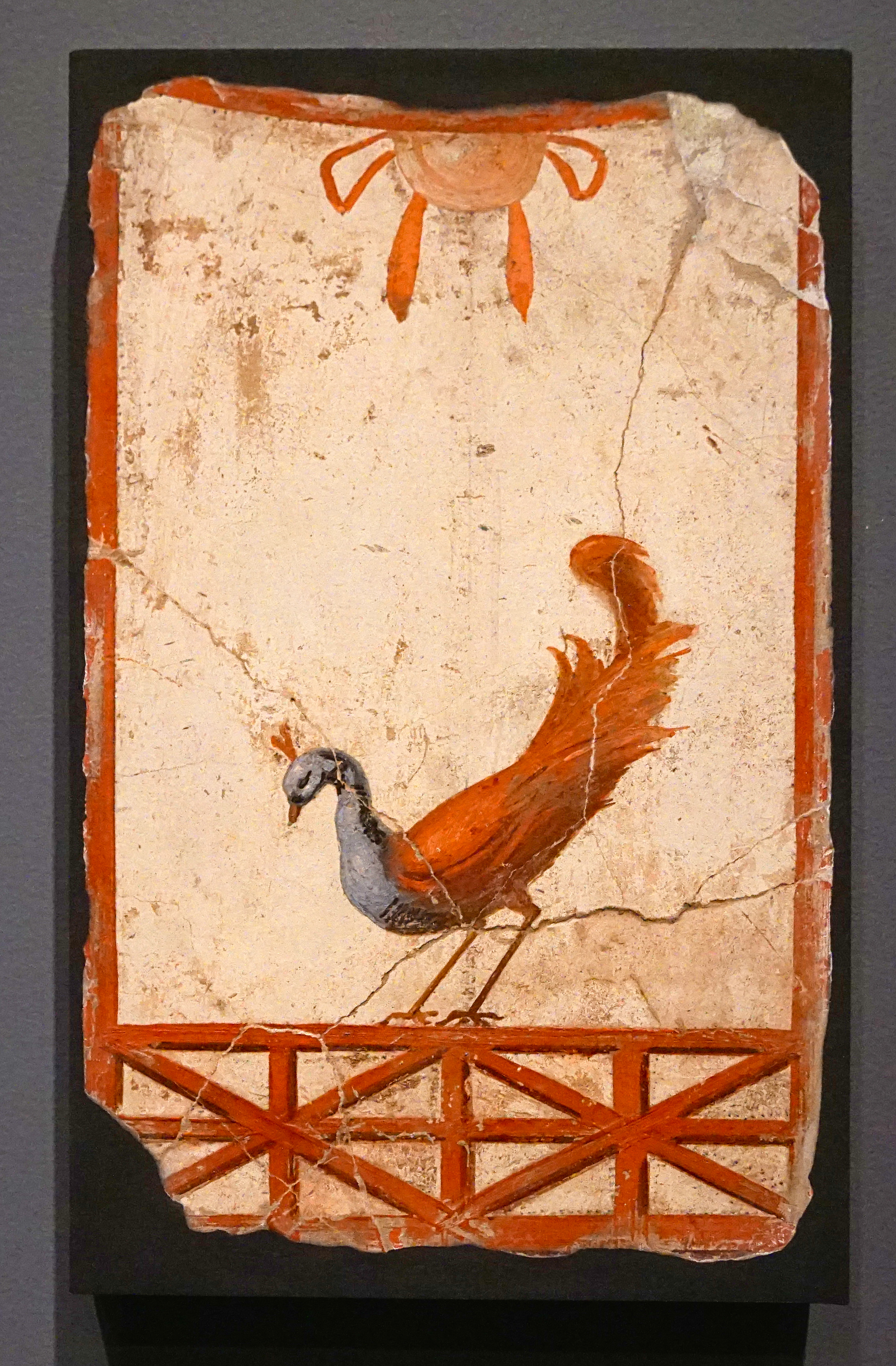
Roman fresco fragment of a peacock

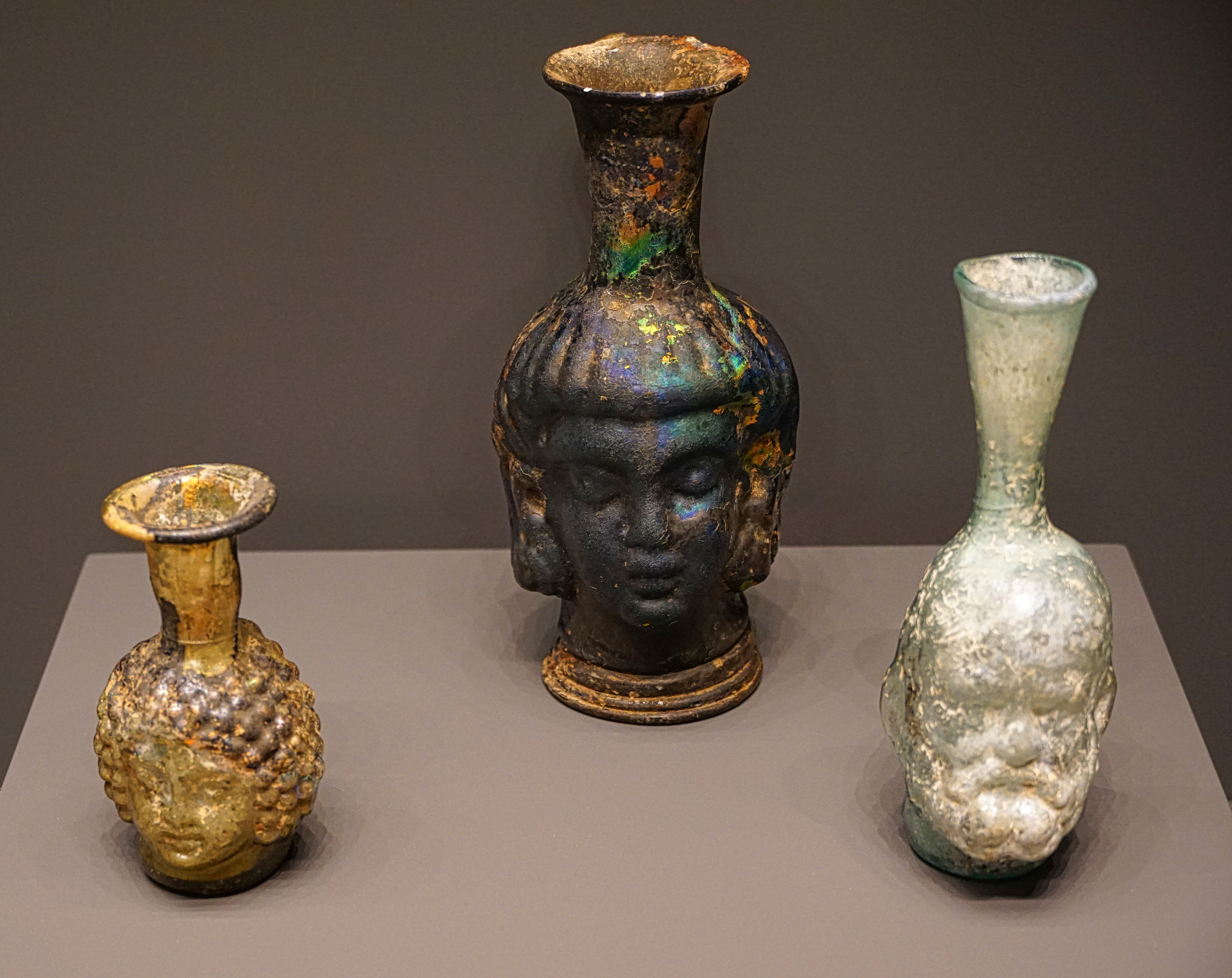
Roman head-shaped glass vessels

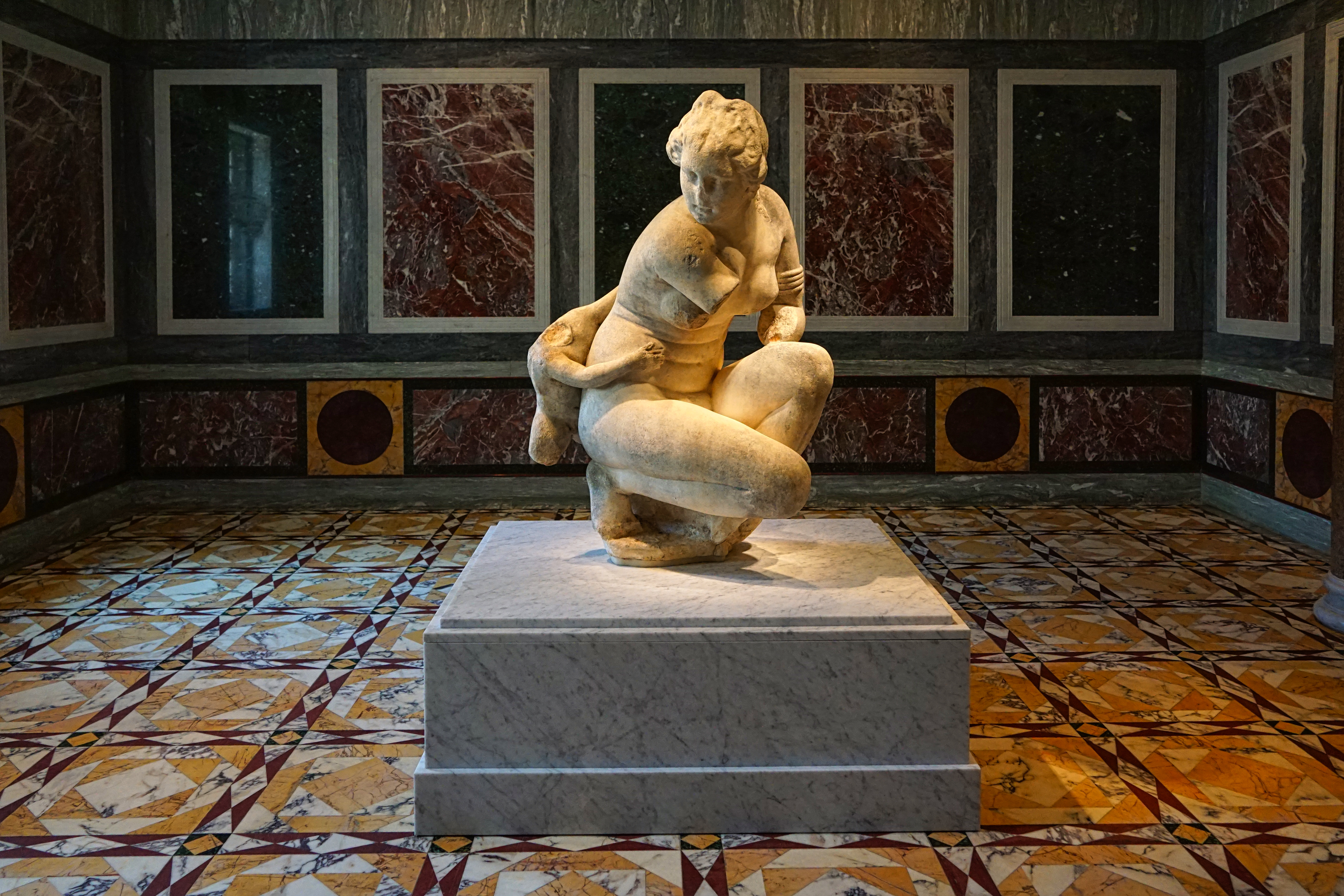
Venus and Eros in Marble Room

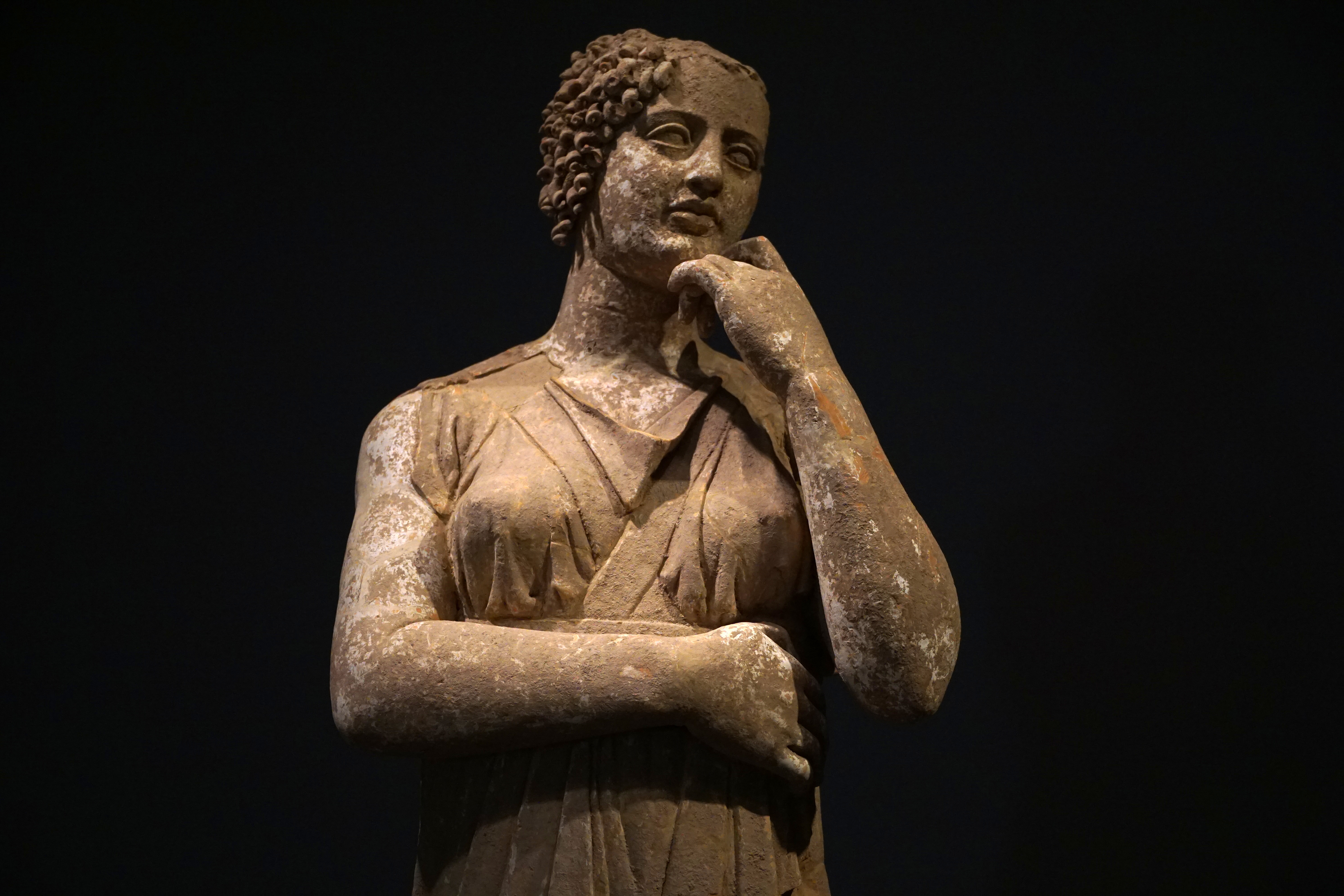
Statue of a Siren

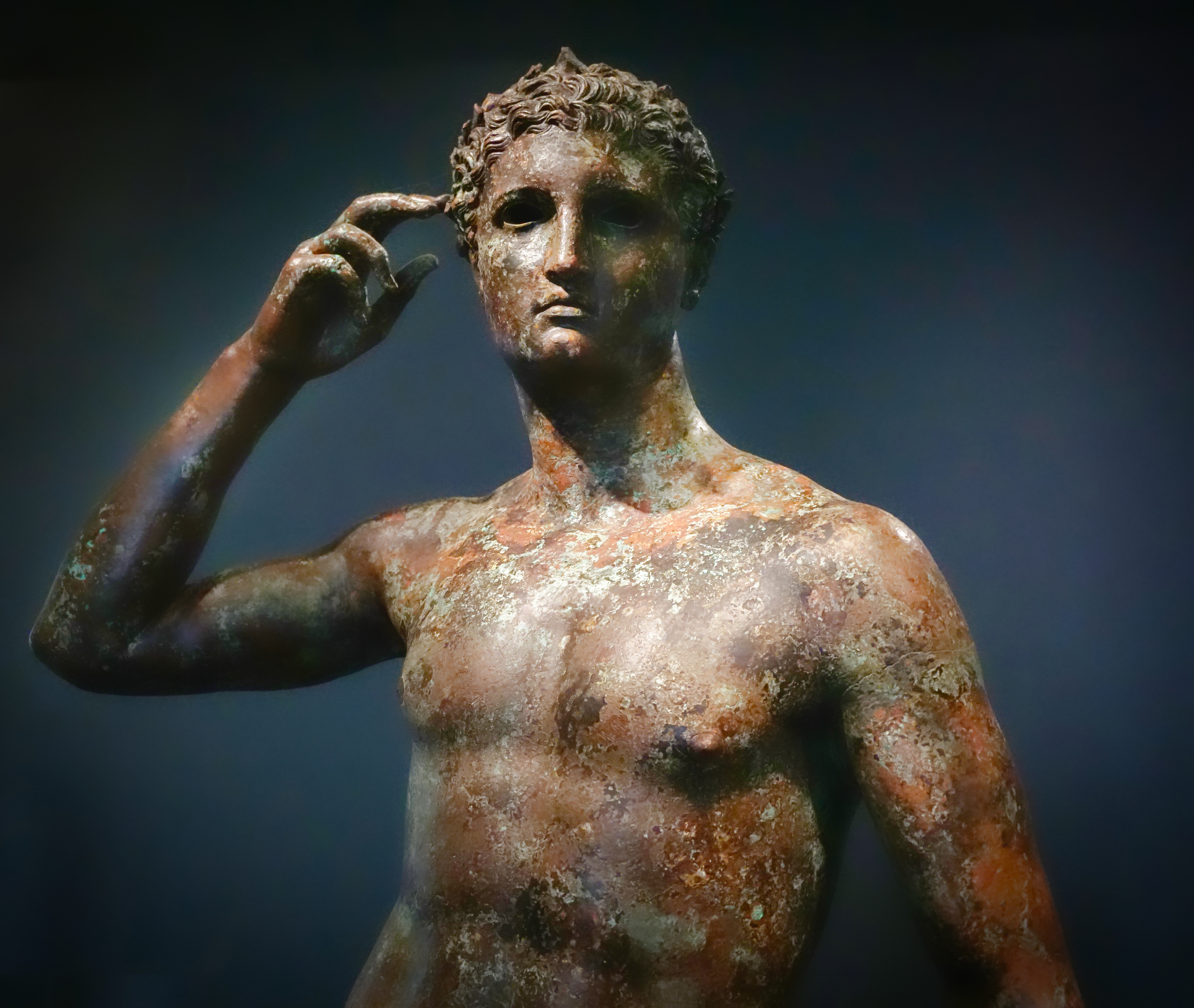
Victorious Youth, part of the museum's collection

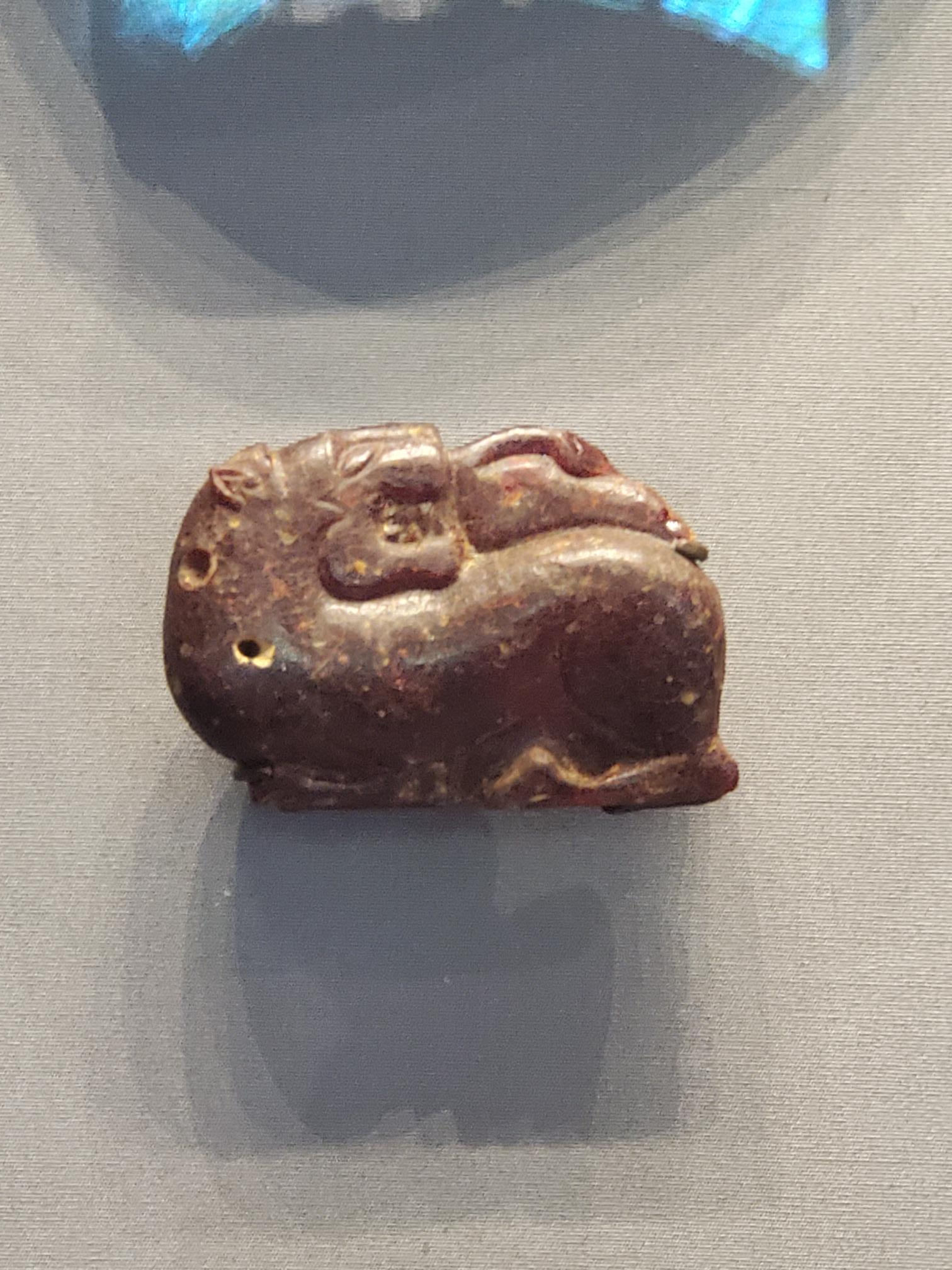
Etruscan amber pendant of a lion and a swan

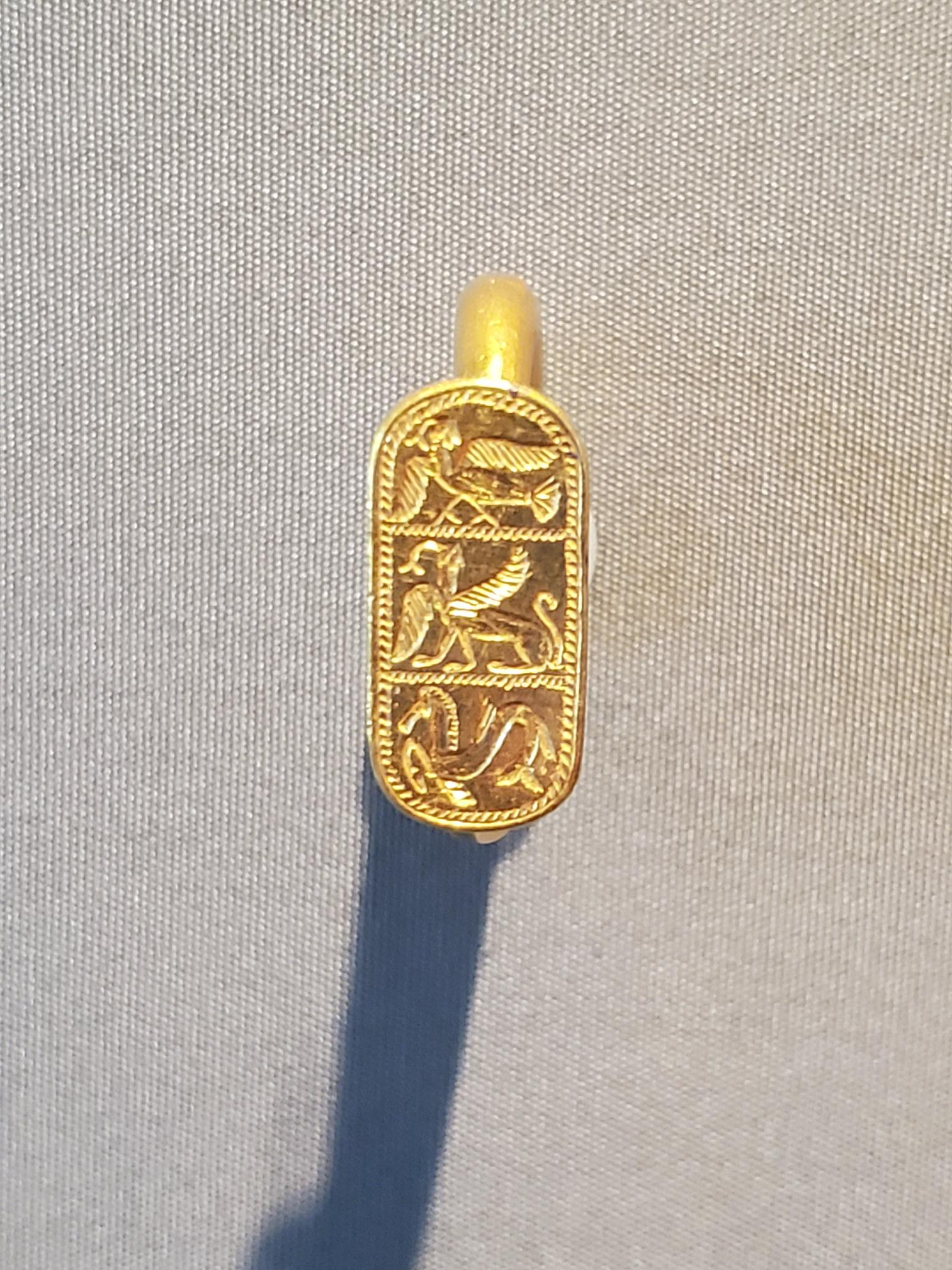
Etruscan gold ring depicting a siren, sphinx, and hippocamp

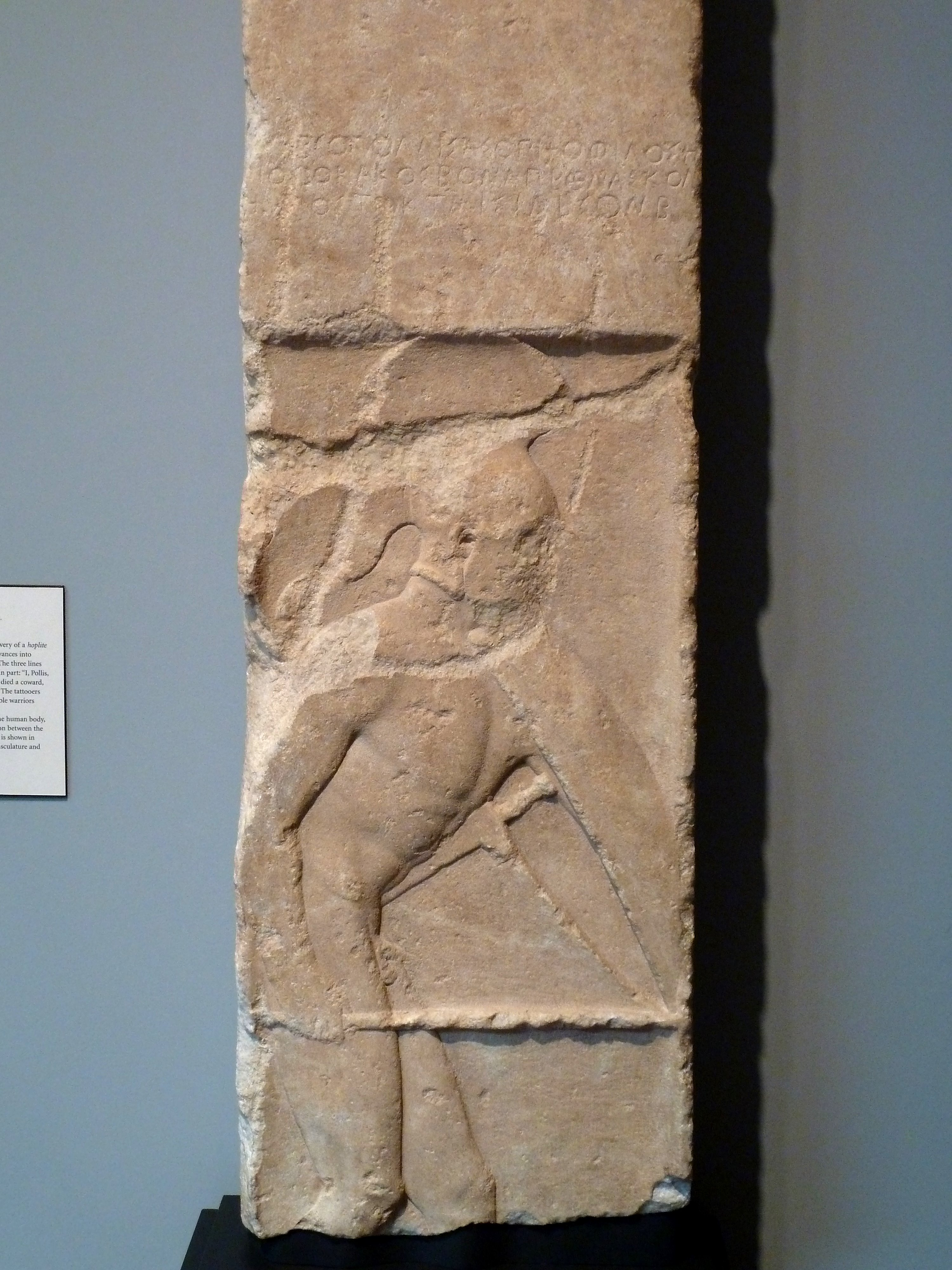
Grave Stele of Pollis (480 BC)

== See also ==
- Camillo Paderni described parts the Villa of the Papyri
