= Lansdowne Heracles =

Roman sculpture of Heracles

- Lansdowne Herakles
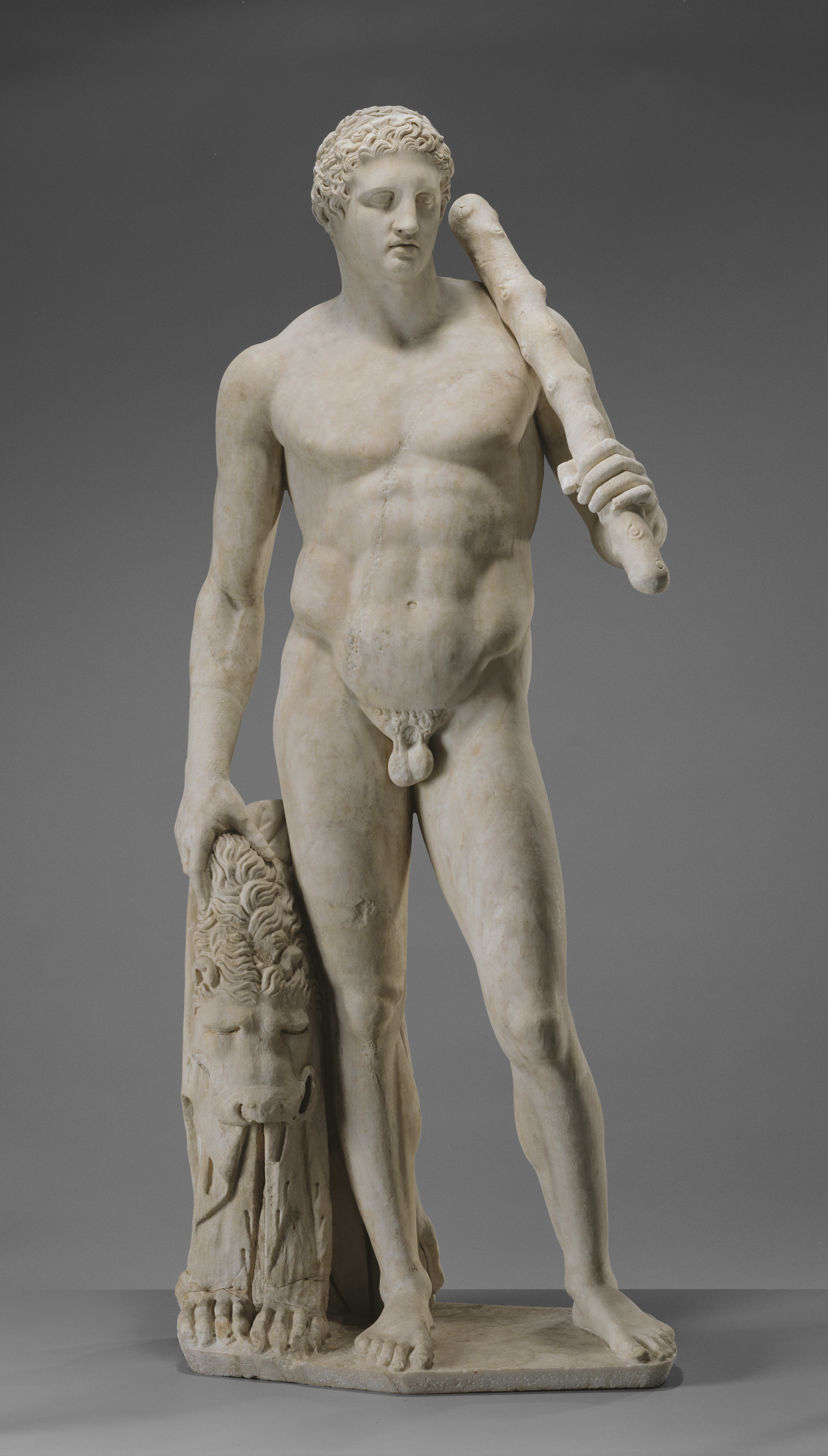
- Year: c. 125 (Julian)
- Medium: marble
- Dimensions: 193.5 cm (76.2 in) × 77.5 cm (30.5 in)
- Location: United States
- Collection: J. Paul Getty Museum

The Lansdowne Heracles is a Roman marble sculpture of about 125 CE. Today it is in the collection of the J. Paul Getty Museum's Getty Villa on the Malibu Coast, Los Angeles. The statue represents the hero Heracles as a beardless Lysippic youth grasping the skin of the Nemean lion with his club upon his shoulder. The work was discovered in 1790 in Tivoli, Italy, on the site of Hadrian's Villa, where many fine Hadrianic copies and pastiches of Greek sculptures had been discovered since the 16th century. Today, the sculpture is considered to be an example of Roman-era improvisations on the Greek sculptural style of the fourth century BCE rather than a copy of a specific Greek original.

The sculpture was found in the part of the villa's former site that had belonged to conte Giuseppe Fede. It was quickly acquired by Thomas Jenkins, an English connoisseur and dealer in antiquities with deep connections to English aristocrats on the Grand Tour. In 1792, the statue was purchased by the first Marquess of Lansdowne. The statue had been fragmentary when rediscovered. It was restored at that time, as fragmentary sculptures did not appeal to neoclassical taste; the sculptor responsible, who was probably Carlo Albacini, completed the statue's missing parts according to the sensibilities of the day: the nose was completed; the right forearm, several fingers, the rear of the lion's hide, part of the right thigh and the whole of the left calf were sculpted and assembled as discreetly as possible. The restorations were removed in the 1970s, after it was detected that iron and lead pins connecting the restorations to the original were swelling from corrosion and threatening to spall off additional pieces of marble. The 18th-century restorations were, in part, replaced with casts in epoxy resin, "to show the original as much as possible free of alien additions" according to the conservator Jerry Podany. They have been re-integrated with the sculpture more recently.

The sculpture remained at Lansdowne House, London, until the grand reception rooms were sheared off in a street-widening scheme. The Lansdowne sculptures were sold at auction in 1930. The oil billionaire and collector J. Paul Getty bought the sculpture in 1951.
