= Meikleour House =

Country house in Perth and Kinross, Scotland

Coordinates: 56.5327°N 3.3767°W

Designations

Inventory of Gardens and Designed Landscapes in Scotland
- Official name: Meikleour
- Designated: 1 July 1987
- Reference no.: GDL00279

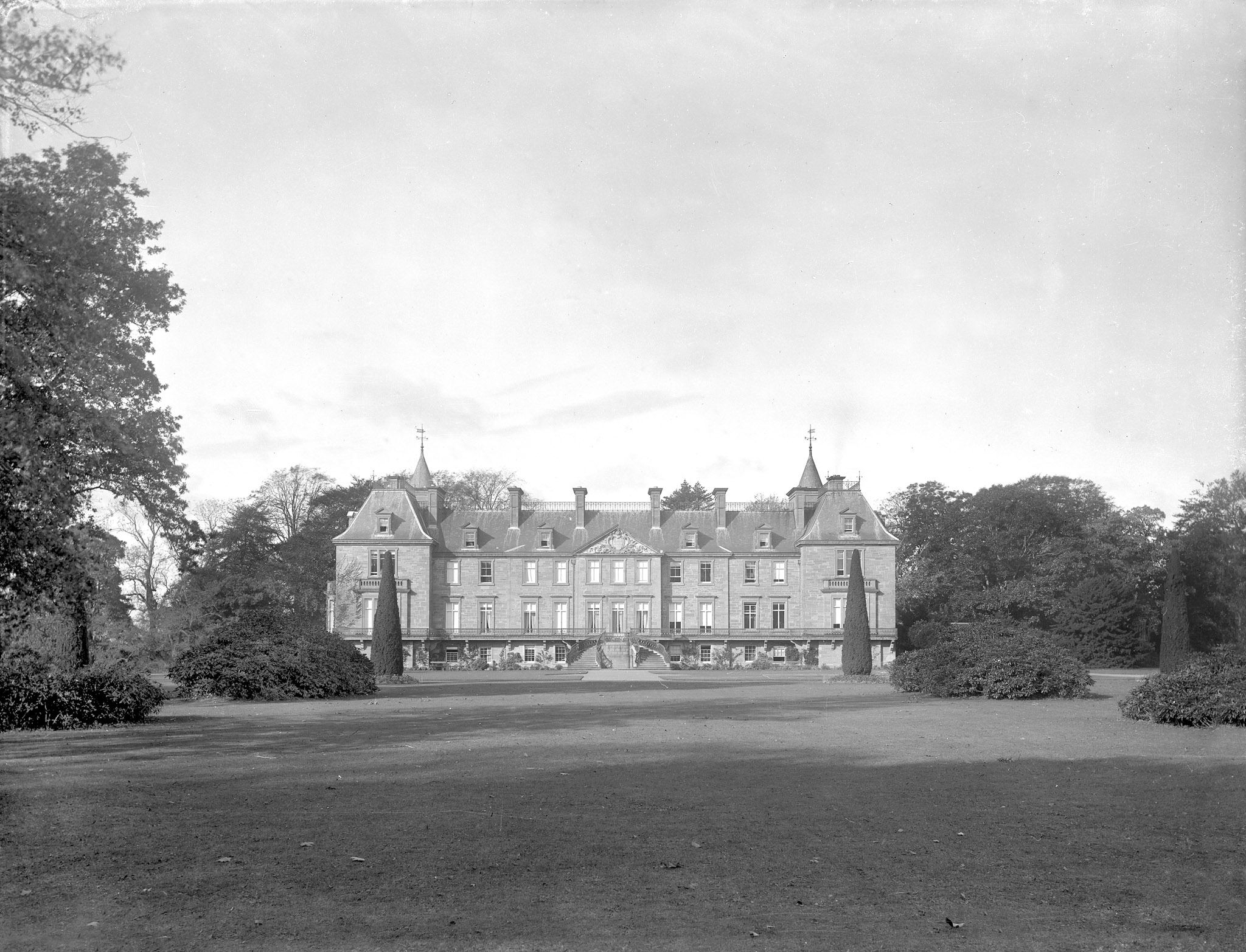
Meikleour House (19th century)

Meikleour House is a country house on the Meikleour estate near Meikleour, Perth and Kinross, Scotland. The present house, which incorporates an 18th-century core, was remodelled in 1869–70 by David Bryce, and is protected as a Category B listed building. The house stands within the Inventory-listed designed landscape of the Meikleour Beech Hedges, on a terrace overlooking the River Tay.

== History ==
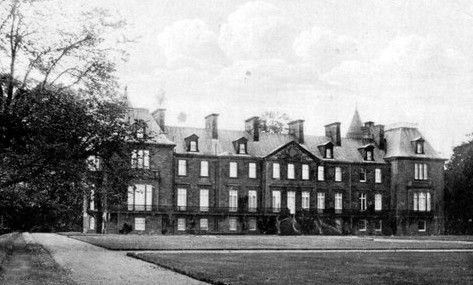
View of Meikleour House

=== Early Origins and Mercer Family Lineage ===
The Mercer family’s connection to Meikleour dates back to 1362, when King David II granted the barony of Meikleour to John Mercer, a wealthy merchant from Perth who served as a royal counsellor and “frequently Scotland’s ambassador to England, France and Holland”.

Generations later, the Mercers endured both tragedy and transition: Henry Mercer of Meikleour was killed at the Battle of Flodden in 1513, and James Mercer regained royal favour under Charles II as a Gentleman Usher. The male line frequently failed, leading inheritance to pass through daughters—for example, one male Mercer heir died in infancy and the estate continued under his sister Helen’s descendants.

=== 18th Century Mansion and Beech Hedge ===
Jean Mercer, a descendant of Helen’s line, married Robert Murray, the younger son of William Murray, 2nd Lord Nairne, who adopted the Mercer name. In 1734 the couple built a symmetrical classical mansion, featuring a segmental monogrammed pediment, a three-bay centre, and pavilion wings with Venetian windows.

Robert Mercer of Aldie was a Jacobite who was killed at the Battle of Culloden in 1746. Around that time the famous Meikleour Beech Hedge was planted, traditionally said to commemorate estate workers who fell at Culloden. Rising to about 30 m over a 540 m stretch, it is recognised by Guinness World Records as the tallest hedge in the world and still demands extensive maintenance every decade.

=== 19th Century Transition: Flahaut, Keith, and De Flahaut Families ===
In 1787 the Mercer heiress Jean Mercer, daughter of Colonel William Mercer of Aldie, married the naval commander George Elphinstone, 1st Viscount Keith. Their daughter, Margaret Mercer Elphinstone, inherited Meikleour after her father was created Baron Keith with a special remainder to her. Despite her father’s opposition, she married Charles, Comte de Flahaut, a former aide-de-camp to Napoleon, in 1817.

The couple attempted to reside at Meikleour but found the house in poor condition, leading Margaret to employ architect Joseph Bonomi for essential repairs. Lord Keith meanwhile built the Gothic Tulliallan Castle, which became the family’s Scottish base after his death in 1823. Margaret and Charles later divided their time between Paris, Vienna, and London during his diplomatic postings.

=== Emily Mercer de Flahaut and David Bryce Remodel ===
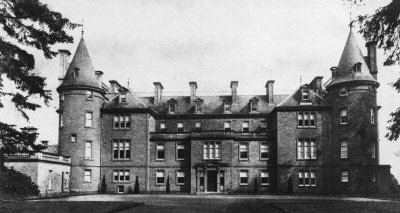
The entrance side of Meikleour House

Their daughter, Emily Mercer de Flahaut, successfully claimed the Nairne peerage and in 1808 married Henry Petty-Fitzmaurice, 4th Marquess of Lansdowne. Following her mother’s death in 1867, Emily commissioned David Bryce to remodel Meikleour House (1869–70) in a French Renaissance château style that reflected her Franco-Scottish heritage.

Bryce rebuilt the west (entrance) front with a two-storey balustraded addition and round towers capped with conical roofs, decorated with the Nairne and Lansdowne arms. The east (garden) front was given curved steps, a full-width iron balcony, distinctive mansard roofs, dormers, and ornate cresting. The interiors included an oak staircase, a gallery about 33 m long, and a decorative scheme in white and gold with pale green satin panels, furnished in Louis XVI–XVIII style and enriched with objets d’art from Emily’s European residences.

=== 20th Century—Tragedy and Transition ===
The Lansdowne family experienced several tragedies. In 1914 Emily’s grandson, Lord Charles Fitzmaurice, who had adopted the surname Mercer Nairne, inherited Meikleour but was killed in action at the First Battle of Ypres. His posthumous son, George Mercer Nairne, eventually succeeded as the 8th Marquess of Lansdowne in 1944, after his cousin Charles, the 7th Marquess, died childless and his younger brother was killed in Normandy nine days earlier. During the Second World War the house served as a maternity hospital.

In the 1950s–60s two fatal incidents occurred in the gun room: the accidental death of Caroline Mercer Nairne (aged 17) and, later, the death of Marchioness Barbara from injuries sustained in a gun blast as well. Following these tragedies the Marquess withdrew from public life, focusing on the gardens, while many of the family’s collections were sold through Christie’s.

=== 21st Century Revival ===
After the 8th Marquess died in 1999, Meikleour passed to his younger son’s line, represented by Lord Robert Harold Mercer Nairne. In the early 2000s a classical porch inspired by the 1734 entrance was added to the north front.

Since 2006 the estate has been managed by Robert’s son Samuel Mercer Nairne and his wife Claire, who is French-born. Initially, they found the house inhospitable, but they remained and revitalised both the estate and the village hotel, the Meikleour Arms, creating self-catering accommodation in the stables, and promoting salmon fishing on the River Tay.

== Architecture ==
Bryce’s remodelling re-faced the Georgian core in a French château idiom, with a flat-topped mansard attic and corner towers—square to the south-east front and round to the north-west.

== Grounds and estate buildings ==
The designed landscape extends to about 156 ha (385 acres) and contains notable features including the Meikleour Beech Hedge; late-18th/early-19th-century stables (with a rear doorway pediment dated 1734), a vase-shaped sundial of 1776, and 18th-century gatepiers near Kinclaven Bridge. A medieval motte (Scheduled Monument SM7293) lies within the policies.

== Designations ==
- Category B listed: the house (LB4420), sundial (LB4421), and old gatepiers near Kinclaven Bridge (LB4423).
- Category B/C: stables (LB4422).
- Inventory of Gardens and Designed Landscapes: Meikleour (GDL00279).
- Scheduled Monument: Motte W of Meikleour House (SM7293).

== Access ==
Meikleour House is a private residence and is not generally open to the public.
