= List of listed buildings in Caputh, Perth and Kinross =

This is a list of listed buildings in the parish of Caputh in Perth and Kinross, Scotland.

== List ==
Name	Location	Date Listed	Grid Ref. (Note: Sometimes known as OSGB36, the grid reference (where provided) is based on the British national grid reference system used by the Ordnance Survey. • "Guide to National Grid". Ordnance Survey. • "Get-a-map". Ordnance Survey.)	Geo-coordinates	Notes	LB Number (Note: Historic Environment Scotland assign a unique alphanumeric identifier to each designated site in Scotland, for listed buildings this always begins with "LB", for example "LB12345".)	Image
Tron Or "Jougs"				56°32′23″N 3°22′18″W	Category B	4447	Upload Photo
Kincairney House, Lodge				56°34′41″N 3°28′48″W	Category C(S)	4451	Upload Photo
Dalbeathie House, With Lodge And Garden Walls, Gates Etc. (One Group)				56°32′41″N 3°32′05″W	Category B	4455	Upload Photo
Spittalfield Green W. Side South Most House (Sir Gavin Lyle, James D. Bryant Tenant.)				56°33′05″N 3°27′12″W	Category B	4463	Upload Photo
Meikleour House, Sundial				56°32′00″N 3°22′33″W	Category B	4421	Upload Photo
Bridge Of Isla, Near Meikleour, Over R. Isla				56°31′40″N 3°21′40″W	Category A	4424	Upload another image
Kincairney House				56°34′49″N 3°29′17″W	Category B	4450	Upload Photo
Boat Of Murthly				56°32′27″N 3°31′36″W	Category B	4456	Upload Photo
Spittalfield, Old School (Sir Gavin Lyle)				56°33′05″N 3°27′08″W	Category C(S)	4458	Upload Photo
Spittalfield Green, 3Rd House From West. (Sir Gavin Lyle, Samuel Grant, Tenant)				56°33′06″N 3°27′12″W	Category C(S)	4469	Upload Photo
Meikleour, The Cottage (House Immediately To North Of Hotel, Charles Flemming Tenant. Meikleour Discretionary Trust)				56°32′31″N 3°22′19″W	Category C(S)	4416	Upload Photo
Spittalfield Green, E. Side, Northmost Cottage (A & C Mclennan, 2 Houses Vacant.)				56°33′07″N 3°27′08″W	Category C(S)	4431	Upload Photo
Spittalfield Green, Fencing				56°33′05″N 3°27′11″W	Category C(S)	4437	Upload Photo
Gourdie House, Sundial Just East Of Gourdie House				56°33′53″N 3°25′44″W	Category C(S)	4442	Upload Photo
Nether Aird				56°32′45″N 3°25′01″W	Category C(S)	4444	Upload Photo
Meikleour Post Office (Archer I And Isabella Firth)				56°32′25″N 3°22′16″W	Category C(S)	4448	Upload Photo
Spittalfield Green, 2Nd House From South. (A & C Maclennan J Louden Tenant				56°33′05″N 3°27′13″W	Category B	4464	Upload Photo
Spittalfield Green, N. Side West Most House. (The Green Miss Jane Smith)				56°33′06″N 3°27′13″W	Category C(S)	4467	Upload Photo
Spittalfield Green, 2Nd House From West. (A & C Mclennan, Andrew Biggar Tenant.)				56°33′06″N 3°27′13″W	Category C(S)	4468	Upload Photo
Meikleour, K6 Telephone Kiosk At Post Office				56°32′24″N 3°22′17″W	Category B	4426	Upload Photo
Spittalfield Green, Centre Block, The Muckle House 1-4, (Sir Gavin Lyle)				56°33′07″N 3°27′12″W	Category B	4427	Upload Photo
Spittalfield Green 2Nd Cottage From North. (A & C Mclennan, Wm Scott, Tenant.)				56°33′07″N 3°27′08″W	Category C(S)	4432	Upload Photo
Cornmill, (Glendelvine Or Ruffel Estate) Millhole				56°33′33″N 3°27′40″W	Category B	4438	Upload Photo
Miller's House At Corn Mill On Glendelvine (Or Ruffel Estate) Millhole				56°33′33″N 3°27′39″W	Category C(S)	4439	Upload Photo
Gourdie House				56°33′52″N 3°25′46″W	Category A	4440	Upload another image
Gourdie House, Walled Garden				56°33′45″N 3°25′44″W	Category C(S)	4443	Upload Photo
Caputh Hall				56°32′39″N 3°29′05″W	Category B	51356	Upload Photo
Easter Claypotts, Caputh				56°32′43″N 3°28′46″W	Category B	4449	Upload Photo
Former Mill, Stenton, 80 Yards West Of Stenton House				56°32′52″N 3°31′23″W	Category C(S)	4454	Upload Photo
Spittalfield Green, S. Side 2 Cottages, East Most Containing Post Office (Sir Gavin Lyle: Tenant Spittalfield Trading Co. Mrs Leyland And Isabella Scott				56°33′04″N 3°27′10″W	Category C(S)	4460	Upload Photo
Spittalfield Green, S. Side Cottage Attached To West Gable Above. West Most House On S. Side Of Green (Mrs Nicol)				56°33′04″N 3°27′11″W	Category C(S)	4462	Upload Photo
Spittalfield Green, 3Rd House From South (Sir Gavin Lyle, Under Reconstruction				56°33′05″N 3°27′13″W	Category B	4465	Upload Photo
Caputh War Memorial				56°32′39″N 3°29′02″W	Category C(S)	4494	Upload Photo
Meikleour, Cottage (Meikleour Discretionary Trust, Robert Mccubbin Tennant.)				56°32′26″N 3°22′17″W	Category C(S)	4413	Upload Photo
Meikleour, 'Parkview'				56°32′20″N 3°22′13″W	Category C(S)	4418	Upload Photo
Spittalfield Green, 4Th Cottage From North. (The Green: Sir Gavin Lyle)				56°33′07″N 3°27′07″W	Category C(S)	4434	Upload Photo
Craigintaggart Cottage				56°34′35″N 3°30′31″W	Category B	4452	Upload Photo
Caputh Parish Church Churchyard Walls And Gate Dismantled				56°32′38″N 3°29′04″W	Category C(S)	4493	Upload Photo
Hagart Of Glendelvine Monument, Mute Hill				56°32′35″N 3°29′34″W	Category C(S)	4497	Upload Photo
Meikleour House,				56°31′58″N 3°22′36″W	Category B	4420	Upload Photo
Spittalfield Green, East Most Cottage, (A & C Mclennan, John Myles Tenant)				56°33′07″N 3°27′09″W	Category C(S)	4430	Upload Photo
Spittalfield Green 5Th Cottage From North (Sir Gavin Lyle: Unoccupied)				56°33′06″N 3°27′07″W	Category C(S)	4435	Upload Photo
Spittalfield Green 3Rd And 2Nd Houses From South. (Sir Gavin Lyle, Colin Todd, Tenant James Black				56°33′06″N 3°27′07″W	Category C(S)	4436	Upload Photo
Easter Drumatherty, Farmhouse				56°33′15″N 3°25′37″W	Category C(S)	47551	Upload Photo
Spittalfield North Most House (The Green: A & C Mcclaren, Colin Mcleod Tennant				56°33′06″N 3°27′13″W	Category C(S)	4466	Upload Photo
Caputh Old Kirkyard, Mute Hill				56°32′35″N 3°29′38″W	Category C(S)	4495	Upload Photo
Meikleour, Old Post Office, (Meikleour Discretionary Trust, Mrs C Stuart, Tenant)				56°32′24″N 3°22′16″W	Category C(S)	4411	Upload Photo
Meikleour Hotel (Meikleour Discretionary Trust, Elizabeth Forsyth Tenant)				56°32′30″N 3°22′18″W	Category B	4415	Upload another image
Meikleour School And Schoolhouse				56°32′25″N 3°22′21″W	Category C(S)	4417	Upload Photo
Meikleour Cross, Meikleour				56°32′25″N 3°22′18″W	Category A	4446	Upload Photo
Snaigow Steading, Snaigow				56°34′12″N 3°30′05″W	Category C(S)	4453	Upload Photo
Beechwood, S. Side Spittalfield Green, Next Old School. (Former Dominie's House) (Sir Gavin Lyle)				56°33′04″N 3°27′09″W	Category C(S)	4459	Upload Photo
Caputh Parish Church				56°32′38″N 3°29′04″W	Category B	4492	Upload another image
Delvine Vault, Mute Hill				56°32′35″N 3°29′38″W	Category B	4496	Upload Photo
Meikleour, Cottage (Mr Craig Tenant.) Next To Old Post Office (Meikleor Discretionary, Trust)				56°32′24″N 3°22′16″W	Category C(S)	4412	Upload Photo
Old Dower House, Meikleour, Now Called 'Brick House' (Meikleour Discretionary Trust, James Reid, Tenant.)				56°32′18″N 3°22′11″W	Category B	4419	Upload Photo
Meikleour House, Stables				56°32′06″N 3°22′39″W	Category C(S)	4422	Upload Photo
Spittalfield, K6 Telephone Kiosk, Spittalfield Green				56°33′05″N 3°27′12″W	Category B	4425	Upload Photo
Spittalfield Green, N Side 3Rd, And 4Th Cottages From East (Now One House). (A & C Mclennan, Muldoon And P. Forbes, Tenants)				56°33′07″N 3°27′10″W	Category C(S)	4428	Upload Photo
Spittalfield Green, 3Rd Cottage From North. (East Side A & C, Mclennan, G. Hunter Tenant.)				56°33′07″N 3°27′07″W	Category C(S)	4433	Upload Photo
Spittalfield Green, S.Side Cottage Attached To West - Most Of Above. (Burnside William M. Scott)				56°33′04″N 3°27′11″W	Category B	4461	Upload Photo
Spittalfield Green, 4Th House From West. (Sir Gavin Lyle Alex Baird Tenant				56°33′06″N 3°27′12″W	Category C(S)	4470	Upload Photo
Meikleour, Cottage Called Two Peek, And Joiners Shop, At Corner West Of Robert Mccubbin's House. (Meikleour Discretionary Trust, Mrs. James Lamont Tenant At Two Peeks				56°32′25″N 3°22′18″W	Category C(S)	4414	Upload Photo
Meikleour House, Old Gate Piers Near Kindaven Bridge				56°31′44″N 3°21′56″W	Category B	4423	Upload Photo
Spittalfield Green, 2Nd Cottage From East. (A & C Mclennan, Denis Scott Tenant)				56°33′07″N 3°27′09″W	Category C(S)	4429	Upload Photo
Gourdie House, Wall On Lethendy - Craigie Road				56°33′54″N 3°25′35″W	Category C(S)	4441	Upload Photo

== Key ==
The scheme for classifying buildings in Scotland is:

- Category A: "buildings of national or international importance, either architectural or historic; or fine, little-altered examples of some particular period, style or building type."
- Category B: "buildings of regional or more than local importance; or major examples of some particular period, style or building type, which may have been altered."
- Category C: "buildings of local importance; lesser examples of any period, style, or building type, as originally constructed or moderately altered; and simple traditional buildings which group well with other listed buildings."

In March 2016 there were 47,288 listed buildings in Scotland. Of these, 8% were Category A, and 50% were Category B, with the remaining 42% being Category C.
