= Edmond Fitzmaurice, 1st Baron Fitzmaurice =

British politician (1846–1935)

The Right Honourable The Lord Fitzmaurice PC FBA
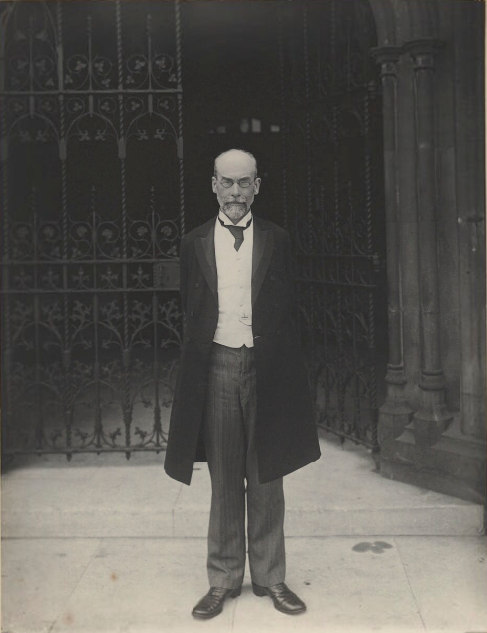

Chancellor of the Duchy of Lancaster
- In office 13 October 1908 – 25 June 1909
- Monarch: Edward VII
- Prime Minister: H. H. Asquith
- Preceded by: The Viscount Wolverhampton
- Succeeded by: Herbert Samuel

Personal details
- Born: 19 June 1846 Lansdowne House, London
- Died: 21 June 1935 (aged 89)
- Party: Liberal
- Spouse: Caroline Fitzgerald (m. 1889; ann. 1894)
- Parent(s): Henry Petty-FitzMaurice, 4th Marquess of Lansdowne; Emily de Flahault
- Education: Eton College
- Alma mater: University of Cambridge (MA)

Edmond George Petty-Fitzmaurice, Baron Fitzmaurice, PC FBA (19 June 1846 – 21 June 1935), styled Lord Edmond FitzMaurice from 1863 to 1906, was a British Liberal politician. He served as Under-Secretary of State for Foreign Affairs from 1883 to 1885 and again from 1905 to 1908, when he entered the cabinet as Chancellor of the Duchy of Lancaster under H. H. Asquith. However, illness forced him to resign the following year.

== Early life and education ==
Born at Lansdowne House in London, Fitzmaurice was the second son of Henry Petty-FitzMaurice, 4th Marquess of Lansdowne and his second wife Emily de Flahault, daughter of the French statesman Charles Joseph, comte de Flahaut. His elder brother was the statesman Henry Petty-FitzMaurice, 5th Marquess of Lansdowne. Fitzmaurice was educated at Eton College and Trinity College, Cambridge, where he served as President of the Cambridge Union in 1866. He studied the Classical Tripos and graduated with a first class degree in 1868.

== Career ==
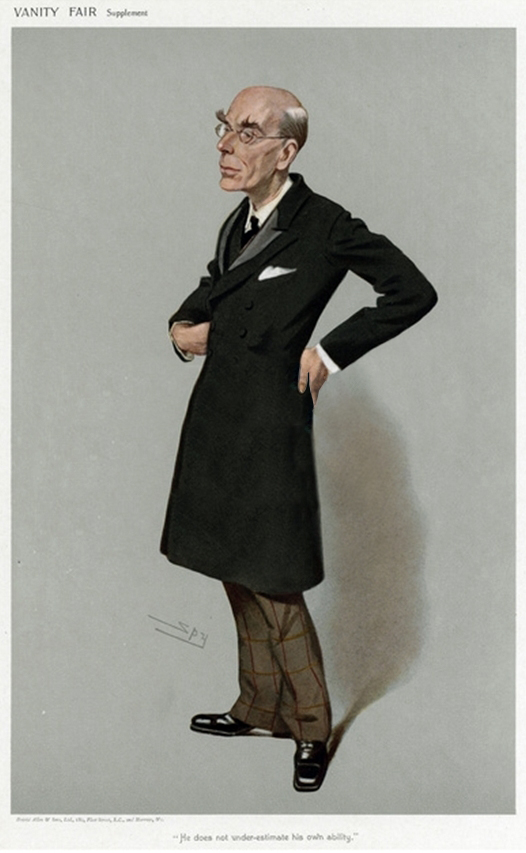
"He does not under-estimate his own ability". Lord Fitzmaurice as depicted by "Spy" (Leslie Ward) in Vanity Fair, June 1906.

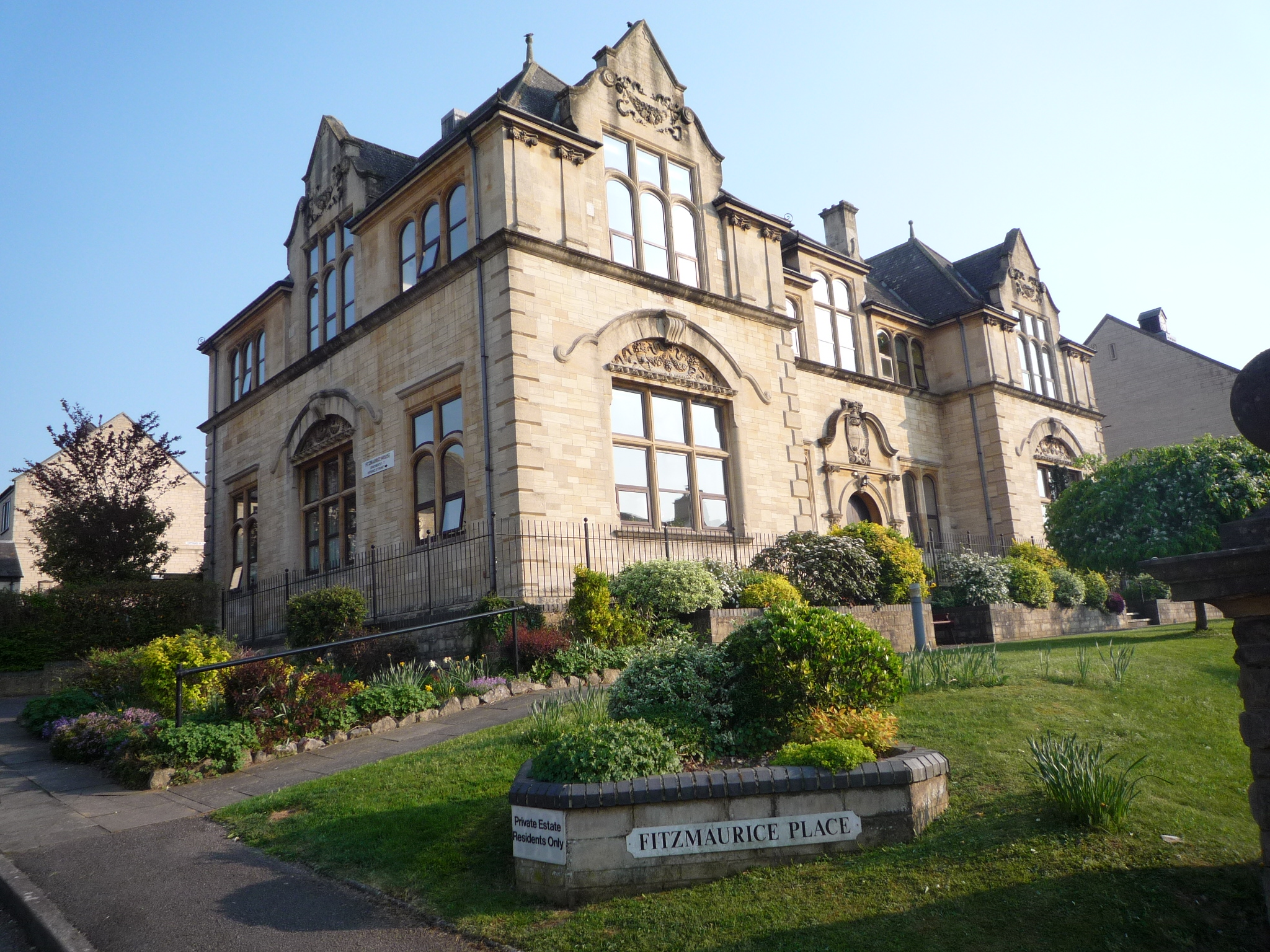
The County School was started with financial support from Fitzmaurice. On his death it was renamed Fitzmaurice Grammar School, currently in residential use as Fitzmaurice Place

Fitzmaurice was called to the Bar at Lincoln's Inn in 1871, but never practised. In 1868 Fitzmaurice was elected unopposed to Parliament for the family constituency of Calne, a seat he would hold until 1885, and served as Parliamentary Private Secretary to Robert Lowe, Chancellor of the Exchequer and later Home Secretary, from 1872 to 1874, when the Liberals fell from office. He was appointed Commissioner at Constantinople in 1880, overseeing the reorganisation of the European provinces of the Ottoman Empire under the Berlin Treaty of 1878. However, his ambitious plans and ideas for the area were never implemented.

The Liberal party had returned to power in 1880, and in 1883 William Gladstone appointed Fitzmaurice Under-Secretary of State for Foreign Affairs, succeeding Sir Charles Dilke, which he remained until the fall of the Liberal Government in 1885. The Calne constituency he had represented since 1868 was abolished in 1885, and he was instead chosen as the Liberal party candidate for the Glasgow constituency of Blackfriars and Hutchesontown. However, illness forced Fitzmaurice into semi-retirement before the elections. He returned to public life in 1887 but was unsuccessful in his attempts to return to Parliament when he stood for Deptford in the 1892 general election and for Cricklade in the 1895 general election.

However, in 1898 he was successfully returned for Cricklade in a by-election, a constituency he would represent until 1906. When the Liberals came to power in late 1905 under Sir Henry Campbell-Bannerman, Fitzmaurice was appointed to his old post of Under-Secretary of State for Foreign Affairs, but to the surprise of many he was overlooked for a Cabinet post. He was in fact offered the position of Foreign Secretary (which for five years prior had been held by his brother Lord Lansdowne) should Sir Edward Grey refuse it (which he did not).

Fitzmaurice chose not to stand in the 1906 General Election, and was instead raised to the peerage as Baron Fitzmaurice, of Leigh in the County of Wiltshire. He remained at the Foreign Office after H. H. Asquith became Prime Minister of the United Kingdom in April 1908 and was admitted to the Privy Council the same month. In October 1908 he was appointed Chancellor of the Duchy of Lancaster, with a seat in the Cabinet. However, a recurrence of his earlier illness forced him to resign the following year, marking the end of his political career.

Following Asquith's ascension to the premiership, Fitzmaurice was critical of what he saw as "the Liberals' aimless drift in domestic politics," although following his resignation he was (according to one study) "anxious to dispel rumours that his resignation was caused by a rift with Asquith or misgivings over Lloyd George's controversial 'People's Budget.'"

=== Business and publications ===
Apart from his participation in national politics, Lord Fitzmaurice serve as Chairman of Wiltshire County Council from 1896 to 1906. He was also a biographer, and published works on his great-grandfather, the Prime Minister the 2nd Earl of Shelburne and of his earlier ancestor, the economist, scientist and philosopher Sir William Petty (in Life of Sir William Petty 1623 - 1687, published 1895), of the 2nd Earl Granville and of Charles William Ferdinand, Duke of Brunswick, amongst others. He served as a trustee of the National Portrait Gallery.

Published works of Lord Fitzmaurice include:

- 1875: Life of William, earl of Shelburne, afterwards first marquess of Lansdowne
- 1895: The Life of Sir William Petty, 1623-1687
- 1901: Charles William Ferdinand, Duke of Brunswick : An Historical Study, 1735-1806. London : Longmans, Green & Co.
- 1905: The life of Granville George Leveson Gower, second earl Granville, K.G., 1815-1891in 2 vols.
- 1912: Life of William, earl of Shelburne, afterwards first marquess of Lansdowne (2nd, revised, edition) in 2 vols.
- 1914: The country dressmaker : a play in three acts.
- 1914: Dandy dolls.
- 1914: Moonlighter.

=== Awards and honours ===
Fitzmaurice was awarded Fellowship of the British Academy (FBA) in 1914. He provided the finance to set up the County School in Bradford-on-Avon which was renamed Fitzmaurice Grammar School in his honour after his death. Fitzmaurice Primary School is also named in his honour. Dauntsey's School have named a school house in his honour, as he served as a school governor there from 1893.

== Personal life ==
Lord Fitzmaurice married Caroline FitzGerald in 1889, daughter of William John FitzGerald of Connecticut. Their marriage was annulled in 1894 and they had no children. He died in June 1935, two days after his 89th birthday. The title Baron Fitzmaurice became extinct on his death. Fitzmaurice lived at Leigh House in Bradford-on-Avon, now the Leigh Park Hotel. His family's home was at Bowood House, near Chippenham.

== Arms ==
Coat of arms of Edmond Fitzmaurice, 1st Baron Fitzmaurice
Coronet A Coronet of a Baron Crest 1st, a beehive beset with bees, diversely volant, proper; 2nd, a centaur drawing a bow and arrow, proper, the part from the waist argent. Escutcheon Quarterly : 1st and 4th Ermine, on a bend, azure a magnetic needle pointing at a polar star, or, (Petty); 2nd and 3rd Argent, a saltier, gules, a chief, ermine (Fitzmaurice); a crescent for difference. Supporters Two pegasi, ermine.; bridled, crined, winged, and unguled, or, each charged on the shoulder with a fienr-de-lis, azure. Motto Virtute non verbis (By courage, not words).

Parliament of the United Kingdom
Preceded by Robert Lowe	Member of Parliament for Calne; 1868 – 1885	Constituency abolished
Preceded by Alfred Hopkinson	Member of Parliament for Cricklade; 1898 – 1906	Succeeded by John Massie
Political offices
Preceded by Sir Charles Dilke, Bt	Under-Secretary of State for Foreign Affairs; 1883–1885	Succeeded by Hon. Robert Bourke
Preceded by Earl Percy	Under-Secretary of State for Foreign Affairs; 1905–1908	Succeeded by Thomas McKinnon Wood
Preceded by Sir Henry Fowler	Chancellor of the Duchy of Lancaster; 1908–1909	Succeeded by Herbert Samuel
Peerage of the United Kingdom
New creation	Baron Fitzmaurice; 1906–1935	Extinct
