= Emily Petty-Fitzmaurice, Marchioness of Lansdowne =

British peeress (1819–1895)

The Most Honourable The Marchioness of Lansdowne
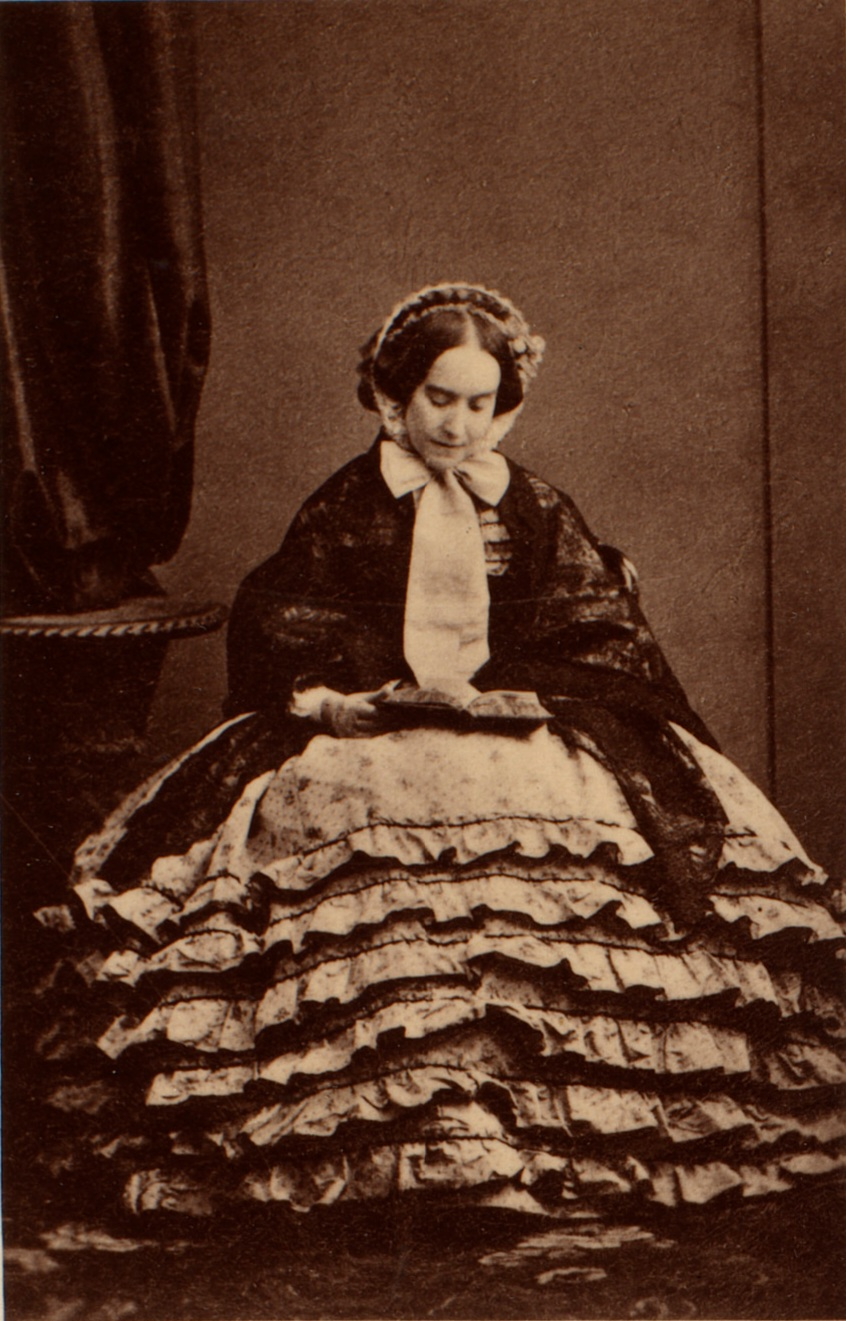
- Emily Petty-Fitzmaurice, Marchioness of Lansdowne, 1888
- Born: Emily Jane de Flahaut; 16 May 1819; Edinburgh, Scotland
- Died: 26 June 1895 (aged 76); Meikleour, Scotland
- Title: Lady Nairne
- Spouse: Henry Petty-Fitzmaurice, 4th Marquess of Lansdowne (m. 1843; died 1866)
- Children: Henry Petty-Fitzmaurice, 5th Marquess of Lansdowne; Edmond Fitzmaurice, 1st Baron Fitzmaurice; Lady Emily Digby
- Parents: Charles de Flahaut de La Billarderie, Comte de Flahaut (father); Margaret Mercer Elphinstone, 2nd Baroness Keith and 7th Lady Nairne (mother)

De Flahaut family arms

Emily Jane Mercer Elphinstone Petty-Fitzmaurice, Marchioness of Lansdowne and 8th Lady Nairne (née de Flahaut; 16 May 1819 – 26 June 1895) was a British peeress.

== Early life ==
Born in Edinburgh, she was the eldest daughter of the French general and statesman, Charles, Comte de Flahaut by his wife, Margaret. Her half-brother was Charles, Duc de Morny, the half-brother of Emperor Napoleon III through her stepmother, Hortense de Beauharnais. She was also a granddaughter of the Prince de Talleyrand.

In 1834, when she was aged only 15, Frédéric Chopin published his Boléro, Op. 19, with a dedication to her.

== Personal life ==
On 1 November 1843, at the British embassy in Vienna, she married Henry Petty-Fitzmaurice, then-Earl of Shelburne. They had three children:

- Henry Charles Keith Petty-Fitzmaurice (1845–1927), later 5th Marquess of Lansdowne
- Edmond George Petty-Fitzmaurice (1846–1935), later 1st Baron Fitzmaurice
- Lady Emily Louisa Anne Petty-Fitzmaurice (1855–1939), married Hon. Everard Charles Digby (third son of Edward Digby, 9th Baron Digby) and had issue

In 1863, her husband inherited his father's marquessate, whereby she became Marchioness of Lansdowne. Although she was unable to inherit her mother's Keith barony as remainder was restricted to male heirs of her mother (of which there were none), she was, however, recognised by the House of Lords as the 8th Lady Nairne in 1874, her mother having inherited the title in 1837 (although she did not attempt to claim this title during her lifetime).

On her death at Meikleour House in 1895, the Nairne title devolved upon her eldest son.

== Notes ==
- Chisholm, Hugh, ed. (1911). "Nairne, Carolina, Baroness" . Encyclopædia Britannica. Vol. 19 (11th ed.). Cambridge University Press. pp. 154–155.

Peerage of Scotland
Preceded by Margaret Keith (not recognised)	Lady Nairne; 1867–1895 (recognised in 1874)	Succeeded by Henry Petty-FitzMaurice
