= Parliamentary Under-Secretary of State for Foreign, Commonwealth and Development Affairs =

UK government position

Parliamentary Under-Secretary of State for Foreign Affairs
- Royal Arms of HM Government
- Incumbent; Inactive Position since 11 May 2010
- Foreign, Commonwealth and Development Office
- Reports to: Foreign Secretary
- Nominator: Prime Minister of the United Kingdom
- Appointer: The Prime Minister approved and sworn in by the Queen-in-Council
- Term length: No fixed term
- Formation: 1782
- First holder: William Fraser

The parliamentary under-secretary of state for foreign affairs was a junior position in the British government, subordinate to both the secretary of state for foreign affairs and since 1945 also to the minister of state for foreign affairs. The post is based at the Foreign, Commonwealth and Development Office, which was created by the merger of the Foreign Office, where the position was initially based, with the Commonwealth Office in 1968 and the Department for International Development in 2020. Notable holders of the office include Granville Leveson-Gower, 2nd Earl Granville, John Wodehouse, 1st Earl of Kimberley, Edward Grey, 1st Viscount Grey of Fallodon, George Curzon, 1st Marquess Curzon of Kedleston, and Anthony Eden.

== List of ministers ==
Name	Portrait	Term of office		Political party	P.M.	F.Sec.
Parliamentary Under-Secretary of State for Foreign Affairs
William Fraser		1782	1789			
Richard Brinsley Sheridan		1782	1782	Whig	Marquess of Rockingham	Fox
George Maddison		1782	1783	Whig	Earl of Shelburne	Lord Grantham
George Maddison		1782	1783	Whig	Duke of Portland	Fox
St Andrew St John		1783	1789		Pitt the Younger	Earl Temple
St Andrew St John		1783	1789		Pitt the Younger	Duke of Leeds
Dudley Ryder		1789	1789	Tory	Pitt the Younger	Duke of Leeds
Sir James Burges, 1st Baronet		1789	January 1796		Pitt the Younger	Duke of Leeds
Sir James Burges, 1st Baronet		1789	January 1796		Pitt the Younger	Lord Grenville
George Canning		January 1796	April 1799	Tory	Pitt the Younger	Lord Grenville
John Hookham Frere		April 1799	September 1800		Pitt the Younger	Lord Grenville
Edward Fisher		September 1800	February 1801		Pitt the Younger	Lord Grenville
Frederick Hervey, Baron Hervey		February 1801	November 1803		Addington	Lord Hawkesbury
Charles Arbuthnot		November 1803	June 1804	Tory	Addington	Lord Hawkesbury
William Eliot		June 1804	February 1805	Tory	Pitt the Younger	Lord Harrowby
Robert Ward		February 1805	February 1806	Tory	Pitt the Younger	Lord Mulgrave
George Walpole		February 1806	March 1807		Lord Grenville	Fox
George Walpole		February 1806	March 1807		Lord Grenville	Charles Grey, Viscount Howick
Sir Francis Vincent, 9th Baronet		February 1806	March 1807		Duke of Portland	Canning
James Harris, Viscount FitzHarris		March 1807	August 1807		Duke of Portland	Canning
Charles Bagot		August 1807	December 1809		Duke of Portland	Canning
Charles Bagot		August 1807	December 1809		Perceval	Earl Bathurst
Culling Charles Smith		December 1809	February 1812		Perceval	Marquess Wellesley
Edward Cooke		February 1812	1817		Perceval	Marquess Wellesley
Edward Cooke		February 1812	1817		Earl of Liverpool	Marquess of Londonderry
Joseph Planta		25 July 1817	22 January 1822	Tory	Earl of Liverpool	Marquess of Londonderry
Richard Meade, 3rd Earl of Clanwilliam		January 1822	January 1823		Earl of Liverpool	Marquess of Londonderry
Richard Meade, 3rd Earl of Clanwilliam		January 1822	January 1823		Earl of Liverpool	Canning
Lord Francis Conyngham		January 1823	January 1826	Tory	Earl of Liverpool	Canning
Charles Ellis, 6th Baron Howard de Walden		July 1824	June 1828	Tory	Earl of Liverpool	Canning
Charles Ellis, 6th Baron Howard de Walden		July 1824	June 1828	Tory	Earl of Liverpool	Earl of Dudley
Ulick de Burgh, 1st Marquess of Clanricarde		January 1826	1827	Tory	Earl of Liverpool	Earl of Dudley
Cospatrick Douglas-Home, Lord Dunglass		June 1828	November 1830	Tory	Duke of Wellington	Earl of Dudley
Cospatrick Douglas-Home, Lord Dunglass		June 1828	November 1830	Tory	Duke of Wellington	Earl of Aberdeen
Sir George Shee, 2nd Baronet		26 November 1830	13 November 1834	Whig	Earl Grey	Viscount Palmerston
Sir George Shee, 2nd Baronet		26 November 1830	13 November 1834	Whig	Viscount Melbourne	Viscount Palmerston
George Cowper, Viscount Fordwich		13 November 1834	17 December 1834	Whig	Duke of Wellington	Duke of Wellington
Philip Stanhope, Viscount Mahon		17 December 1834	18 April 1835	Conservative	Peel	Duke of Wellington
William Fox-Strangways		18 April 1835	7 March 1840	Whig	Viscount Melbourne	Viscount Palmerston
Granville Leveson-Gower, Baron Leveson		7 March 1840	4 September 1841	Whig	Viscount Melbourne	Viscount Palmerston
Charles Canning, 2nd Viscount Canning		4 September 1841	27 January 1846	Conservative	Peel	Earl of Aberdeen
George Smythe		27 January 1846	6 July 1846	Conservative	Peel	Earl of Aberdeen
Edward Stanley		6 July 1846	12 February 1852	Whig	Russell	Viscount Palmerston
Edward Stanley		6 July 1846	12 February 1852	Whig	Russell	Earl Granville
Austen Henry Layard		12 February 1852	18 May 1852	Whig	Russell	Earl Granville
Edward Stanley, Baron Stanley		18 May 1852	28 December 1852	Conservative	Earl of Derby	Earl of Malmesbury
John Wodehouse, 3rd Baron Wodehouse		28 December 1852	5 July 1856	Whig	Earl of Aberdeen	Lord John Russell
John Wodehouse, 3rd Baron Wodehouse		28 December 1852	5 July 1856	Whig	Earl of Aberdeen	Earl of Clarendon
Henry Petty-Fitzmaurice, Earl of Shelburne		5 July 1856	26 February 1858	Whig	Viscount Palmerston	Earl of Clarendon
William Vesey-FitzGerald		26 February 1858	19 June 1859	Conservative	Earl of Derby	Earl of Malmesbury
John Wodehouse, 3rd Baron Wodehouse		19 June 1859	15 August 1861	Liberal	Viscount Palmerston	Earl Russell
Austen Henry Layard		15 August 1861	6 July 1866	Liberal	Viscount Palmerston	Earl Russell
Austen Henry Layard		15 August 1861	6 July 1866	Liberal	Earl Russell	Earl of Clarendon
Edward Egerton		6 July 1866	12 December 1868	Conservative	Earl of Derby	Edward Stanley, Baron Stanley
Edward Egerton		6 July 1866	12 December 1868	Conservative	Disraeli	Edward Stanley, Baron Stanley
Arthur Otway		12 December 1868	9 January 1871	Liberal	Gladstone	Earl of Clarendon
Arthur Otway		12 December 1868	9 January 1871	Liberal	Gladstone	Earl Granville
George Byng, Viscount Enfield		9 January 1871	23 February 1874	Liberal	Gladstone	Earl Granville
Robert Bourke		23 February 1874	28 April 1880	Conservative	Disraeli	Earl of Derby
Robert Bourke		23 February 1874	28 April 1880	Conservative	Disraeli	Marquess of Salisbury
Sir Charles Dilke, 2nd Baronet		28 April 1880	1 January 1883	Liberal	Gladstone	Earl Granville
Lord Edmond Fitzmaurice		1 January 1883	25 June 1885	Liberal	Gladstone	Earl Granville
Robert Bourke		25 June 1885	28 January 1886	Conservative	Marquess of Salisbury	Marquess of Salisbury
James Bryce		7 February 1886	20 July 1886	Liberal	Gladstone	Earl of Rosebery
Sir James Fergusson, 6th Baronet		4 August 1886	22 September 1891	Conservative	Marquess of Salisbury	Earl of Iddesleigh
Sir James Fergusson, 6th Baronet		4 August 1886	22 September 1891	Conservative	Marquess of Salisbury	Marquess of Salisbury
James Lowther		22 September 1891	18 August 1892	Conservative	Marquess of Salisbury	Marquess of Salisbury
Sir Edward Grey, 3rd Baronet		18 August 1892	20 June 1895	Liberal	Gladstone	Earl of Rosebery
Sir Edward Grey, 3rd Baronet		18 August 1892	20 June 1895	Liberal	Earl of Rosebery	Earl of Rosebery
Sir Edward Grey, 3rd Baronet		18 August 1892	20 June 1895	Liberal	Earl of Rosebery	Earl of Kimberley
George Curzon		20 June 1895	15 October 1898	Conservative	Marquess of Salisbury	Marquess of Salisbury
St John Brodrick		15 October 1898	12 November 1900	Conservative	Marquess of Salisbury	Marquess of Salisbury
James Gascoyne-Cecil, Viscount Cranborne		12 November 1900	9 October 1903	Conservative	Marquess of Salisbury	Marquess of Lansdowne
James Gascoyne-Cecil, Viscount Cranborne		12 November 1900	9 October 1903	Conservative	Balfour	Marquess of Lansdowne
Henry Percy, Earl Percy		9 October 1903	18 December 1905	Conservative	Balfour	Marquess of Lansdowne
Lord Edmond Fitzmaurice		18 December 1905	19 October 1908	Liberal	Campbell-Bannerman	Grey
Lord Edmond Fitzmaurice		18 December 1905	19 October 1908	Liberal	Asquith	Grey
Thomas McKinnon Wood		19 October 1908	23 October 1911	Liberal	Asquith	Grey
Francis Dyke Acland		23 October 1911	4 February 1915	Liberal	Asquith	Grey
Neil Primrose		4 February 1915	30 May 1915	Liberal	Asquith	Grey
Lord Robert Cecil		30 May 1915	10 January 1919	Conservative	Asquith	Grey
Lord Robert Cecil		30 May 1915	10 January 1919	Conservative	Lloyd George	Balfour
Cecil Harmsworth		10 January 1919	31 October 1922	Liberal	Lloyd George	Balfour
Ronald McNeill		31 October 1922	23 January 1924	Conservative	Law	Balfour
Ronald McNeill		31 October 1922	23 January 1924	Conservative	Law	Marquess Curzon of Kedleston
Ronald McNeill		31 October 1922	23 January 1924	Conservative	Baldwin	Marquess Curzon of Kedleston
Arthur Ponsonby		23 January 1924	11 November 1924	Labour	MacDonald	MacDonald
Ronald McNeill		11 November 1924	7 December 1925	Conservative	Baldwin	Chamberlain
Godfrey Locker-Lampson		7 December 1925	11 June 1929	Conservative	Baldwin	Chamberlain
Hugh Dalton		11 June 1929	3 September 1931	Labour	MacDonald	Henderson
Anthony Eden		3 September 1931	18 January 1934	Conservative	MacDonald	Marquess of Reading
Anthony Eden		3 September 1931	18 January 1934	Conservative	MacDonald	Simon
James Stanhope, 7th Earl Stanhope		18 January 1934	16 June 1936	Conservative	MacDonald	Simon
James Stanhope, 7th Earl Stanhope		18 January 1934	16 June 1936	Conservative	Baldwin	Hoare
James Stanhope, 7th Earl Stanhope		18 January 1934	16 June 1936	Conservative	Baldwin	Eden
Robert Gascoyne-Cecil, Viscount Cranborne		18 June 1935	20 February 1938	Conservative	Baldwin (1935–37); Chamberlain (1937–40)	Eden (1935–38); Viscount Halifax (1938–40)
Ivor Windsor-Clive, 2nd Earl of Plymouth		30 July 1936	12 May 1940	Conservative	Baldwin (1935–37); Chamberlain (1937–40)	Eden (1935–38); Viscount Halifax (1938–40)
Rab Butler		25 February 1938	20 July 1941	Conservative	Chamberlain	Viscount Halifax
Rab Butler		25 February 1938	20 July 1941	Conservative	Churchill	Viscount Halifax
Rab Butler		25 February 1938	20 July 1941	Conservative	Churchill	Eden
Richard Law		20 July 1941	25 September 1943	Conservative	Churchill	Eden
George Hall		25 September 1943	26 May 1945	Labour	Churchill	Eden
Alec Douglas-Home, Lord Dunglass		26 May 1945	26 July 1945	Conservative	Churchill	Eden
Simon Fraser, 15th Lord Lovat		26 May 1945	26 July 1945	Conservative	Churchill	Eden
Hector McNeil		4 August 1945	4 October 1946	Labour	Attlee	Bevin
Christopher Mayhew		4 October 1946	2 March 1950	Labour	Attlee	Bevin
William Henderson, 1st Baron Henderson		7 June 1948	26 October 1951	Labour	Attlee	Bevin
Ernest Davies		2 March 1950	26 October 1951	Labour	Attlee	Bevin
Ernest Davies		2 March 1950	26 October 1951	Labour	Attlee	Morrison
Gerald Isaacs, 2nd Marquess of Reading		31 October 1951	11 November 1953	Conservative	Churchill	Eden
Anthony Nutting		31 October 1951	18 October 1954	Conservative	Churchill	Eden
Douglas Dodds-Parker		11 November 1953	18 October 1954	Conservative	Churchill	Eden
Robin Turton		18 October 1954	20 December 1955	Conservative	Churchill (1954–55); Eden (1955–56)	Eden (1954–55); Macmillan (1955); Lloyd (1955–56)
Lord John Hope		18 October 1954	9 November 1956	Conservative	Churchill (1954–55); Eden (1955–56)	Eden (1954–55); Macmillan (1955); Lloyd (1955–56)
Douglas Dodds-Parker		20 December 1955	9 January 1957	Conservative	Eden	Lloyd
David Ormsby-Gore		9 November 1956	9 January 1957	Conservative	Eden	Lloyd
Ian Harvey		18 January 1957	24 November 1958	Conservative	Macmillan	Lloyd
Archibald Acheson, 6th Earl of Gosford		18 January 1957	23 October 1958	Conservative	Macmillan	Lloyd
George Petty-Fitzmaurice, 8th Marquess of Lansdowne		23 October 1958	20 April 1962	Conservative	Macmillan	Lloyd
George Petty-Fitzmaurice, 8th Marquess of Lansdowne		23 October 1958	20 April 1962	Conservative	Macmillan	Alec Douglas-Home
John Profumo		28 November 1958	16 January 1959	Conservative	Macmillan	Lloyd
Robert Allan		16 January 1959	7 October 1960	Conservative	Macmillan	Lloyd
Joseph Godber		28 October 1960	27 June 1961	Conservative	Macmillan	Alec Douglas-Home
Peter Thomas		27 June 1961	27 June 1963	Conservative	Macmillan	Alec Douglas-Home
Peter Smithers		16 July 1962	29 January 1964	Conservative	Macmillan	Alec Douglas-Home
Peter Smithers		16 July 1962	29 January 1964	Conservative	Douglas-Home	Butler
Robert Mathew		30 January 1964	16 October 1964	Conservative	Douglas-Home	Butler
Henry Walston, Baron Walston		20 October 1964	7 January 1967	Labour	Wilson	Walker
Henry Walston, Baron Walston		20 October 1964	7 January 1967	Labour	Wilson	Stewart
Henry Walston, Baron Walston		20 October 1964	7 January 1967	Labour	Wilson	Brown
Bill Rodgers		7 January 1967	3 July 1968	Labour	Wilson	Brown
Maurice Foley		3 July 1968	17 October 1968	Labour	Wilson	Stewart
Parliamentary Under-Secretary of State for Foreign and Commonwealth Affairs
Maurice Foley		17 October 1968	19 June 1970	Labour	Wilson	Stewart
William Whitlock		17 October 1968	13 October 1969	Labour	Wilson	Stewart
Evan Luard		13 October 1969	19 June 1970	Labour	Wilson	Stewart
Anthony Royle		24 June 1970	8 January 1974	Conservative	Heath	Douglas-Home
Peter Kerr, 12th Marquess of Lothian		24 June 1970	9 April 1972	Conservative	Heath	Douglas-Home
Anthony Kershaw		15 October 1970	5 June 1973	Conservative	Heath	Douglas-Home
Peter Blaker		8 January 1974	4 March 1974	Conservative	Heath	Douglas-Home
Goronwy Roberts, Baron Goronwy-Roberts		8 March 1974	4 December 1975	Labour	Wilson	Callaghan
Joan Lestor		8 March 1974	12 June 1975	Labour	Wilson	Callaghan
Ted Rowlands		12 June 1975	14 April 1976	Labour	Wilson	Callaghan
John Tomlinson		17 March 1976	4 May 1979	Labour	Callaghan	Crosland (1976–77); Owen (1977–79)
Evan Luard		14 April 1976	4 May 1979	Labour	Callaghan	Crosland (1976–77); Owen (1977–79)
Richard Luce		6 May 1979	14 September 1981	Conservative	Thatcher	Lord Carrington
David Trefgarne, 2nd Baron Trefgarne		14 September 1981	6 April 1982	Conservative	Thatcher	Lord Carrington
Malcolm Rifkind		6 April 1982	13 June 1983	Conservative	Thatcher	Pym
Ray Whitney		13 June 1983	11 September 1984	Conservative	Thatcher	Howe
Tim Renton		11 September 1984	2 September 1985	Conservative	Thatcher	Howe
Timothy Eggar		2 September 1985	24 July 1989	Conservative	Thatcher	Howe
Tim Sainsbury		24 July 1989	24 July 1990	Conservative	Thatcher	Major
Tim Sainsbury		24 July 1989	24 July 1990	Conservative	Thatcher	Hurd
Mark Lennox-Boyd		24 July 1990	20 July 1994	Conservative	Thatcher	Hurd
Mark Lennox-Boyd		24 July 1990	20 July 1994	Conservative	Major	Hurd
Office vacant from 1994 to 1996
Liam Fox		23 July 1996	1 May 1997	Conservative	Major	Rifkind
Elizabeth Symons, Baroness Symons of Vernham Dean		2 May 1997	28 June 1999	Labour	Blair	Cook
Patricia Scotland, Baroness Scotland of Asthal		28 July 1999	12 June 2001	Labour	Blair	Cook
Valerie Amos, Baroness Amos		12 June 2001	13 June 2003	Labour	Blair	Straw
Ben Bradshaw		12 June 2001	29 May 2002	Labour	Blair	Straw
Mike O'Brien		29 May 2002	13 June 2003	Labour	Blair	Straw
Bill Rammell		28 October 2002	10 May 2005	Labour	Blair	Straw
Chris Mullin		13 June 2003	10 May 2005	Labour	Blair	Straw
David Triesman, Baron Triesman		10 May 2005	28 June 2007	Labour	Blair	Straw
David Triesman, Baron Triesman		10 May 2005	28 June 2007	Labour	Blair	Beckett
Meg Munn		29 June 2007	5 October 2008	Labour	Brown	Miliband
Gillian Merron		5 October 2008	9 June 2009	Labour	Brown	Miliband
Chris Bryant		9 June 2009	11 May 2010	Labour	Brown	Miliband
Role merged into Parliamentary Under-Secretary of State for Asia and the Pacific

== See also ==
- Foreign, Commonwealth and Development Office
- Foreign Secretary
- Minister of State for Europe
- Minister of State for Foreign Affairs
- Minister of State for Middle East and North Africa
- Under-Secretary of State for the Home Department
- Undersecretary
