= Henry Petty-Fitzmaurice, 4th Marquess of Lansdowne =

British politician (1816–1866)

The Most Honourable The Marquess of Lansdowne KG
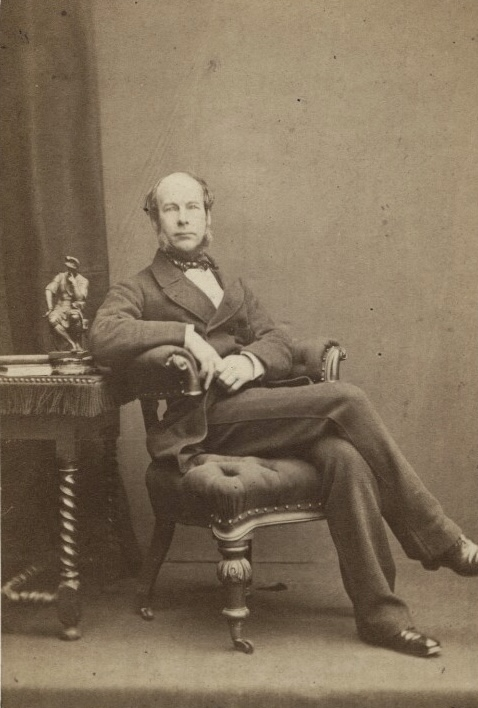
- The 4th Marquess of Lansdowne, c. 1860–1865

Under-Secretary of State for Foreign Affairs
- In office 5 July 1856 – 26 February 1858
- Monarch: Victoria
- Prime Minister: The Viscount Palmerston
- Preceded by: The Lord Wodehouse
- Succeeded by: William Vesey-FitzGerald

Personal details
- Born: 5 January 1816 Lansdowne House, London
- Died: 5 July 1866 (aged 50) Lansdowne House, London
- Party: Liberal
- Spouse(s): (1) Lady Georgiana Herbert (1817–1841) (2) Comtesse Emily de Flahaut (1819–1895)
- Children: Henry; Edmond; Emily
- Parents: Henry Petty-FitzMaurice, 3rd Marquess of Lansdowne; Lady Louisa Fox-Strangways
- Education: Trinity College, Cambridge

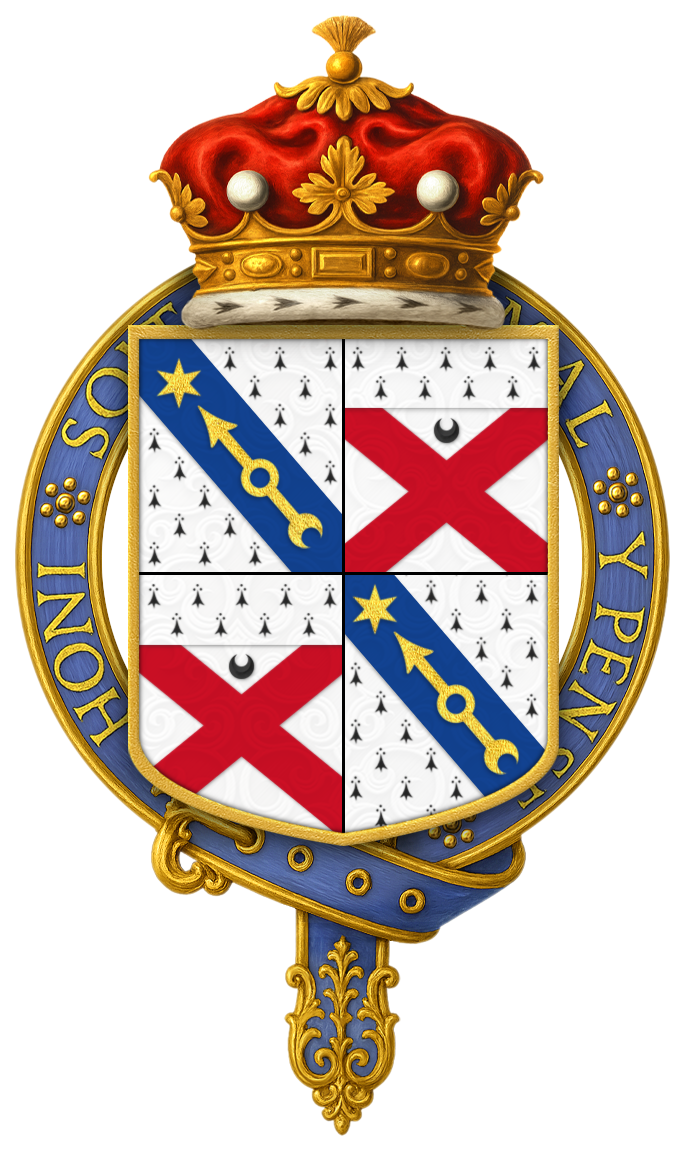
Quartered arms of Henry Petty-Fitzmaurice, 4th Marquess of Lansdowne, KG

Henry Thomas Petty-Fitzmaurice, 4th Marquess of Lansdowne KG (7 January 1816 – 5 July 1866), styled Lord Henry Petty-FitzMaurice until 1836 and Earl of Shelburne between 1836 and 1863, was a British politician.

== Background and education ==
Born Lord Henry Petty-FitzMaurice, he was the second son of Henry Petty-FitzMaurice, 3rd Marquess of Lansdowne, and Lady Louisa Emma, daughter of Henry Fox-Strangways, 2nd Earl of Ilchester. He was educated at Westminster and Trinity College, Cambridge. On the early death of his elder brother the Earl of Kerry in 1836 he became known by the courtesy title Earl of Shelburne.

== Political career ==
After graduation, he entered the Commons as MP for Calne in 1837. He served under Lord John Russell as a Lord of the Treasury from 1847 to 1848. In 1856, he was called up to the House of Lords in his father's barony of Wycombe and was Parliamentary Under-Secretary of State for Foreign Affairs under Lord Palmerston from that year until 1858. On the death of his father in 1863, Lord Shelburne succeeded to his titles and was made a Knight of the Garter a year later.

Historian Simon Kerry (a descendant) writes that he was “a competent administrator but lacked the charisma and flair [of his father the 3rd Marquess]”. In his final months he was one of the Adullamites, whose opposition to Gladstone's 1866 reform bill helped bring down Earl Russell's Liberal ministry.

== Family ==
On 18 August 1840, he married Lady Georgiana Herbert (a daughter of the 11th Earl of Pembroke), but she died six months later. He then married Comtesse Emily de Flahault (the eldest daughter of Charles Joseph, comte de Flahaut and the 2nd Baroness Keith) on 1 November 1843 in Vienna and they had three children:

- Henry Charles Keith, Earl of Shelburne (1845–1927), later Marquess of Lansdowne
- Lord Edmond George (1846–1935), later Baron FitzMaurice
- Lady Emily Louisa Anne (1855–1939), married Col. Hon. Everard Digby, a son of the 9th Baron Digby and had issue

Lord Lansdowne died suddenly from an attack of apoplexy on 5 July 1866; his titles were inherited by his eldest son, Henry.

== Arms ==
Coat of arms of Henry Petty-Fitzmaurice, 4th Marquess of Lansdowne
Coronet A Coronet of a Marquess Crest 1st, a beehive beset with bees, diversely volant, proper; 2nd, a centaur drawing a bow and arrow, proper, the part from the waist argent. Escutcheon Quarterly : 1st and 4th Ermine, on a bend, azure a magnetic needle pointing at a polar star, or, (Petty); 2nd and 3rd Argent, a saltier, gules, a chief, ermine (Fitzmaurice). Supporters Two pegasi, ermine.; bridled, crined, winged, and unguled, or, each charged on the shoulder with a fienr-de-lis, azure. Motto Virtute non verbis (By courage, not words). Orders The Most Noble Order of the Garter - Knight Companion (KG).

== Books ==
- Kerry, Simon. Lansdowne: The Last Great Whig (2018), ISBN 9781910787953, OCLC 1043014305, scholarly biography of his son the 5th Marquess. Online review (Wall Street Journal).

Parliament of the United Kingdom
Preceded by Hon. John Fox-Strangways	Member of Parliament for Calne; 1837–1856	Succeeded by Sir William Williams, Bt
Political offices
Preceded by Viscount Ebrington	Junior Lord of the Treasury; 1847–1848	Succeeded by None
Preceded by The Lord Wodehouse	Under-Secretary of State for Foreign Affairs; 1856–1858	Succeeded by William Vesey-FitzGerald
Peerage of Great Britain
Preceded by Henry Petty-FitzMaurice	Marquess of Lansdowne; 1863–1866	Succeeded by Henry Petty-FitzMaurice
Preceded by Henry Petty-FitzMaurice	Baron Wycombe (writ of acceleration); 1856–1866	Succeeded by Henry Petty-FitzMaurice
