= Filippo De Filippi (explorer) =

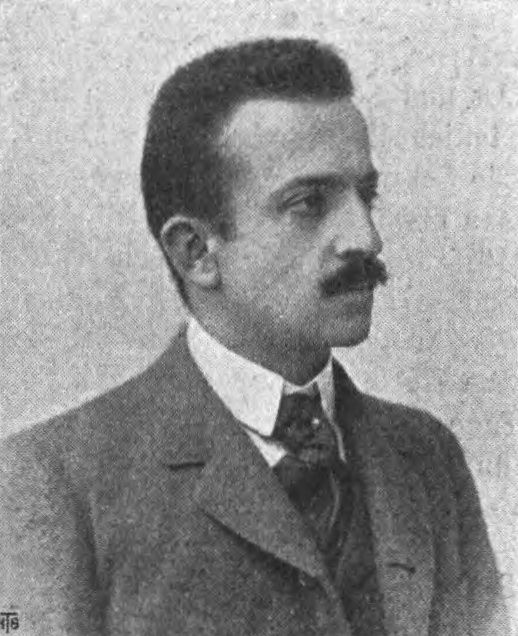
- De Filippi in 1900
- Born: 6 April 1869; Turin, Italy
- Died: 23 September 1938 (aged 69); Florence, Italy
- Occupations: Physician, explorer, scientist
- Spouse: Caroline Fitzgerald (m. 1901; died 1911)

Filippo De Filippi (6 April 1869 – 23 September 1938) was an Italian medical doctor, scientist, mountaineer and explorer. De Filippi was born in Turin on 6 April 1869 to Giuseppe De Filippi, a lawyer, and Olimpia Sella.

== Personal and professional life ==
Working as a doctor De Filippi specialised in physiological chemistry and in experimental aspects of surgery, lecturing at Bologna and Genoa universities.

De Filippi married the poet Caroline Fitzgerald in 1901, daughter of William John Fitzgerald. In World War I he volunteered as a lieutenant colonel in the Red Cross and was posted to London from 1917 to 1919 where he ran the Italian office of propaganda and information. He was awarded the honorary knighthood of KCIE in 1916.

He was the editor of the travel and exploration section of the Enciclopedia italiana. He died at Settignano near Florence on 23 September 1938.

== Expeditions ==
Well known as an Alpine mountaineer, in 1897 De Filippi joined the Duke of the Abruzzi in an expedition to Alaska where they were the first people to climb Mount Saint Elias on 31 July. Then, in 1903, he explored Asia, crossing the Caucasus and entering Turkestan. In 1906 he wrote the book about (though did not take part in) Abruzzi's exploration of the Ruwenzori mountains on the Uganda–Congo border. In 1909 he again went with the Duke of the Abruzzi, this time in the Karakoram mountains, writing the book describing the expedition.

From 1913 to 1914, De Filippi organised and led a large and highly successful scientific expedition to Central Asia: Baltistan, Ladakh and Xinjiang. Accurate gravity and magnetic measurements were made and wireless signals were used to determine longitude. There were ethnological and anthropological, topographical and geological studies. The exploration determined that the Rimo Glacier formed the watershed of Central Asia. The work was written up in seventeen volumes.

== Publications ==
- De Filippi, Filippo; Sella, Vittorio (1900). The ascent of Mount St. Elias [Alaska]. Westminster : A. Constable.
- De Filippi, Filippo; Savoia, Luigi Amedeo di (1908). Ruwenzori : an account of the expedition of Prince Luigi Amedeo of Savoy, duke of the Abruzzi. New York : Dutton.
- De Filippi, Filippo; H.R.H. The Duke of the Abruzzi (1912). Karakoram and Western Himalaya, 1909, an account of the expedition of H.R.H. Prince Luigi Amedeo of Savoy, Duke of Abbruzzi;. Translated by De Filippi, Caroline; Porter, H. T. photographs by Vittorio Sella. New York, Dutton.
- De Filippi, Filippo (1912). List of Illustrations and Index: Karakoram and Western Himalaya, 1909, an account of the expedition of H.R.H. Prince Luigi Amedeo of Savoy, Duke of Abbruzzi. photographs by Vittorio Sella. New York, Dutton.
- De Filippi, Filippo (February 1918). "The Geography of the Italian Front". Geographical Journal. LI (2): 66–75. Bibcode:1918GeogJ..51...65D. doi:10.2307/1780189. JSTOR 1780189.
- De Phillipi, Phillipo, ed. (1931). An Account Of Tibet. The Travels of Ippolito Desideri of Pistoia, S.J., 1712–1727. – travels of Ippolito Desideri
- De Filippi, Filippo (1932). The Italian Expedition to the Himalaya, Karakoram and Eastern Turkestan(1913–1914).
