= Meikleour Beech Hedges =

Hedge in Perth and Kinross, Scotland

Coordinates: 56.5335°N 3.3643°W

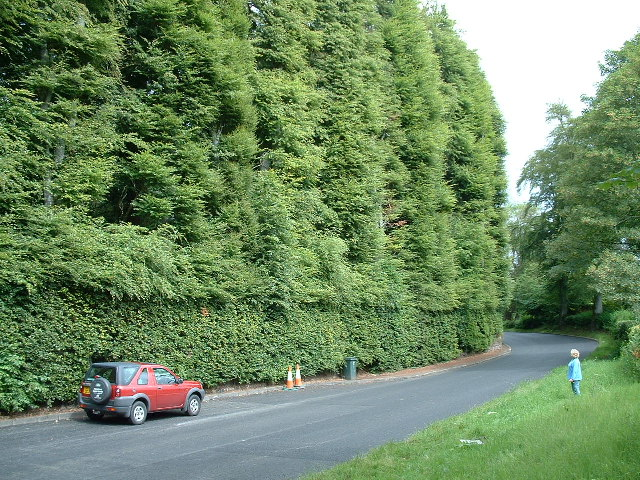
Meikleour Beech Hedges

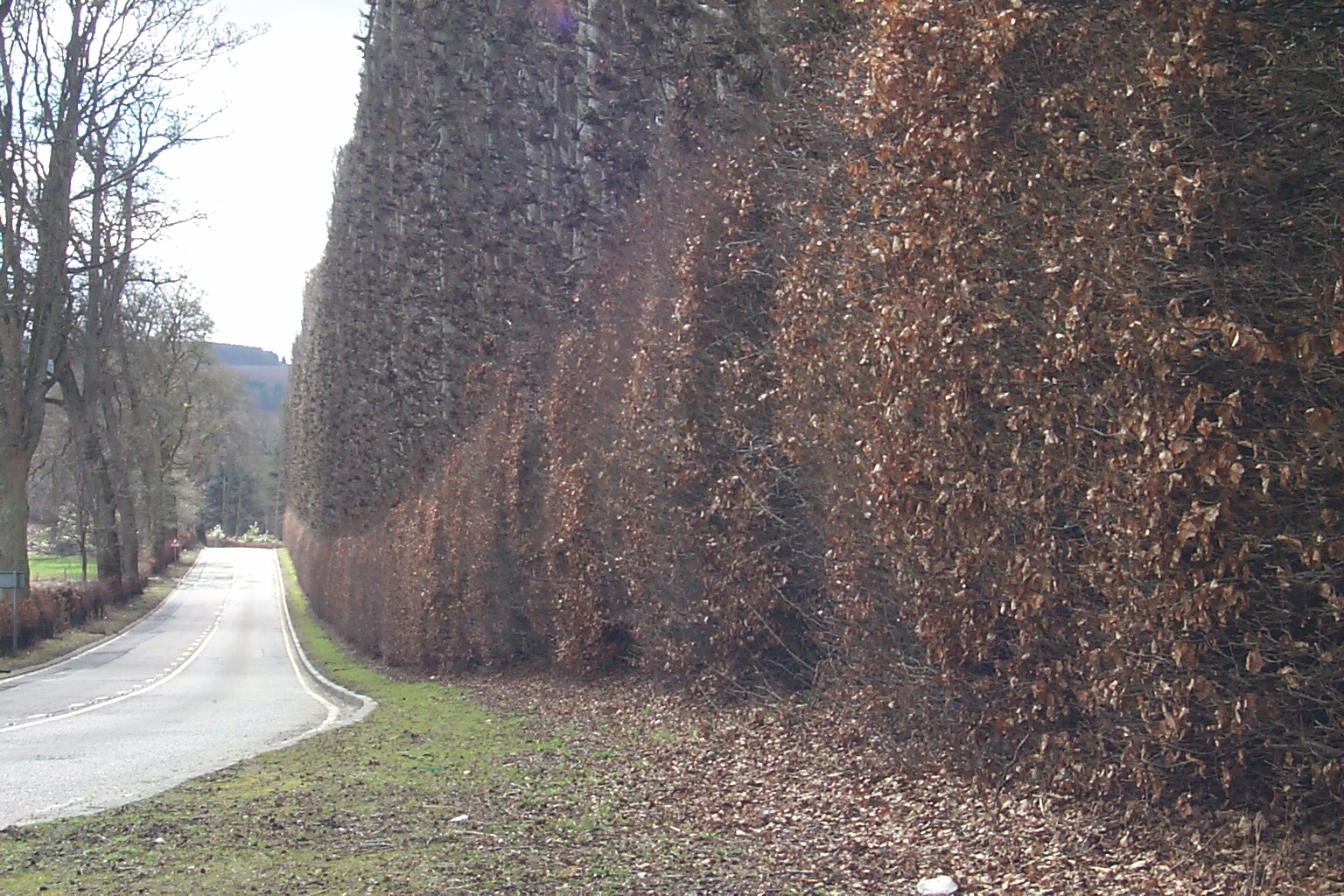
Meikleour Beech Hedges in early spring

The Meikleour Beech Hedge(s) (European beech, Fagus sylvatica), located near Meikleour, Perth and Kinross, Scotland, was planted in the autumn of 1745 by Jean Mercer and her husband Robert Murray Nairne on the Marquess of Lansdowne's Meikleour estate. It is said the hedge grows towards the heavens because the men who planted it were killed at the Battle of Culloden. The hedge lies alongside the A93 Perth-Blairgowrie Road, and can be viewed by visitors all year round.

In 1906 Henry John Elwes and Augustine Henry, in the first volume of their Trees of Great Britain and Ireland, mention the "celebrated beech hedge of Meikleour" as one of the most striking effects produced by the beech in Scotland. "This hedge forms the boundary between the grounds and the highway, and has to be cut in periodically, which is done by men working on a long ladder, from which they are able to reach with shears to about 60 feet. Local history says that this hedge was planted in 1745, and that the men who were planting it left their work to fight at the battle of Culloden, hiding their tools under the hedge, and never returning to claim them.[52] It is 580 yards long, and composed of tall, straight stems planted about 18 inches apart, and nearly touching at the base. The average height of the trees, as I am informed by Mr. Donald Matheson, is 95 feet, and their average girth at 3 feet is 18 to 36 inches. He adds that "close to the ground they are as fresh and green as a young hedge." An illustration of this hedge, taken specially for our work by Mr. D. Milne of Blairgowrie, gives a good idea of its appearance in October 1903." (The illustration is shown in Plate 11 of the volume).

The hedge is noted in the Guinness World Records as the tallest and longest hedge on earth, reaching 30 metres (98 feet) in height and 530 metres (1,740 feet) in length. It is usually trimmed once every ten years, although the most recent trim, which took place in late 2019, was the first in almost 20 years.

== See also ==
- Topiary
