= Caroline Fitzgerald =

American poet

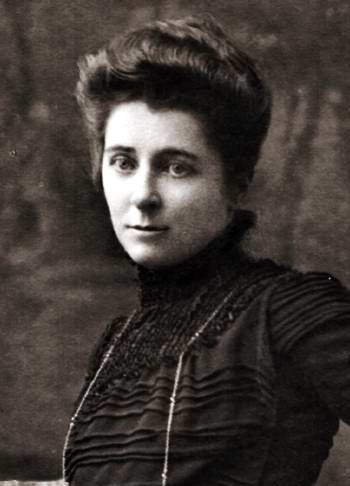
- Caroline Fitzgerald, 1900
- Born: Caroline Fitzgerald; September 22, 1865; Litchfield, Connecticut, US
- Died: December 25, 1911 (aged 46); Rome
- Other names: Caroline Fitz Gerald; Lady Edmond Fitzmaurice; Caroline Petty-Fitzmaurice; Caroline De Filippi
- Occupation: poet
- Notable work: Venetia Victrix and Other Poems
- Spouses: Edmond George Petty-Fitzmaurice (m. 1889; ann. 1895) Filippo De Filippi (m. 1901)

Caroline Fitzgerald (September 22, 1865 – December 25, 1911) was an American poet and litteratrice who spent most of her adult life in Europe, particularly Italy. Although not fabulously rich, she was wealthy enough to move to and fro between The Gilded Age in America and La Belle Époque in Europe. Inspired by Robert Browning's verse, she published a volume of poetry which was well received at the time but which eventually became almost forgotten. She married into the English aristocracy to Lord Edmond Fitzmaurice until she was able to get the marriage annulled after a few years.

After the end of her marriage, as a single woman she travelled widely in Europe becoming friendly with authors including Henry James and Sir Frederic Kenyon. She had romantic relationships with two men, both at the start of their professional careers, who were neither particularly wealthy nor who moved in high society. In 1901 she married the Italian physician, academic, explorer and mountaineer Filippo De Filippi. Together they toured Central Asia and India. Their happy marriage was cut short by her death in 1911 at the age of forty-six.

Her biography, published in 2018, points out the parallels between her life and that of several of the female protagonists in the earlier novels of a writer she knew well, Henry James, exemplified by Isabel Archer in The Portrait of a Lady.

== Early years ==
Caroline Fitzgerald was born on September 22, 1865, in Litchfield, Connecticut, to William John Fitzgerald and Mary Ann White. Her father had been born in 1819, also in Litchfield, coming from a well-connected family of Irish descent. He attended Upper Canada College, later took a law degree at Trinity College, Dublin and then practised law in Toronto. Her mother's father was Eli White, a wealthy New York merchant. Caroline had two brothers: the elder, Augustine (known as Austin), was born in New York in April 1862, went to Yale and became a landscape painter. Her younger brother, Edward, was born in Litchfield on May 10, 1871, went to Trinity College, Cambridge, became a mountaineer and joined the army.

As a young woman, Caroline was well known in New York literary society; she was a classics scholar and one of the first women to study Sanskrit. She went to Europe with her family for about eighteen months in 1876 and then returned to America to live on the island of Mount Desert, Maine. She recorded in her diary that she wrote her first piece of poetry in 1881. Between 1881 and 1882 the family moved between both continents spending some time in Switzerland. In 1883, they lived in London and then Geneva in 1884.

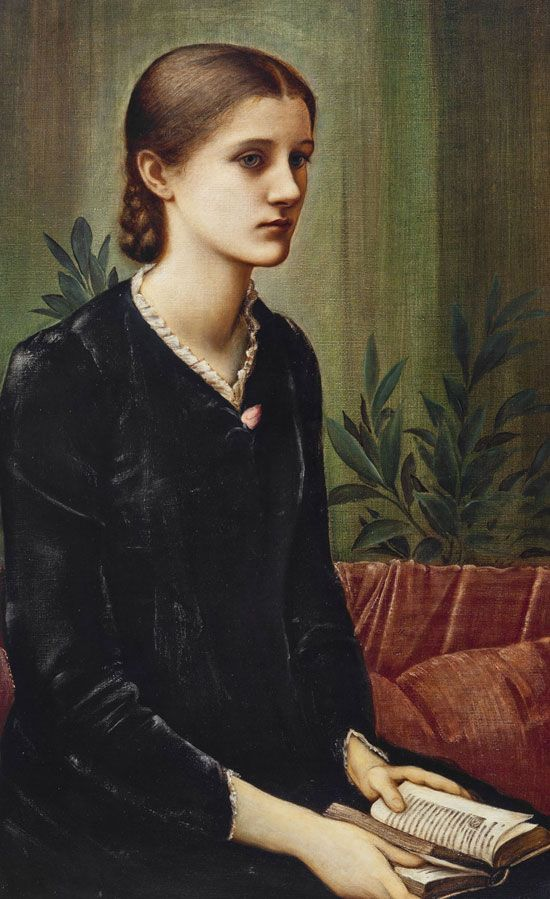
Portrait by Edward Burne-Jones,1884

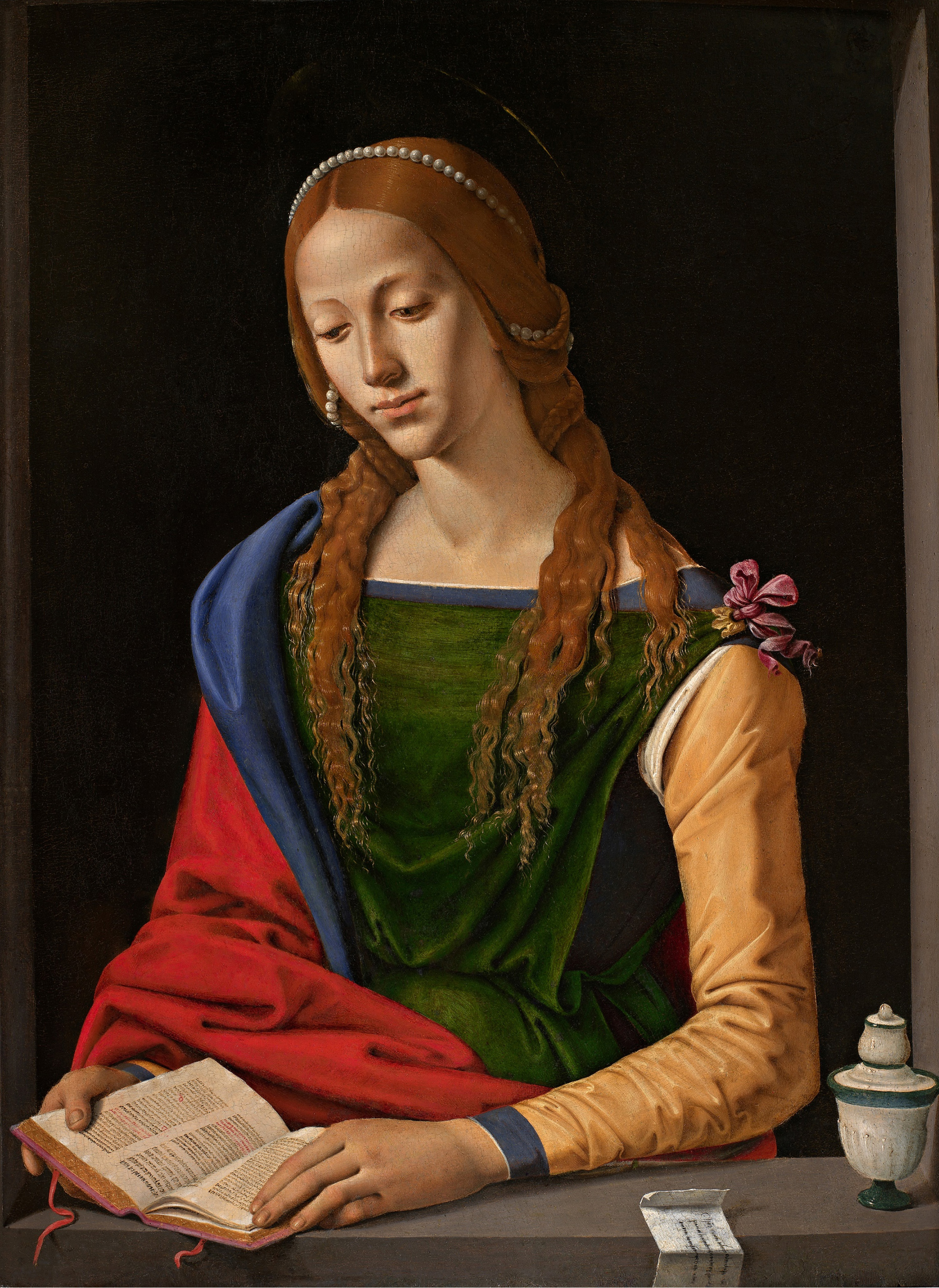
Piero di Cosimo's Maria Maddalena

In 1884, Edward Burne-Jones painted her portrait and it was exhibited in the New Gallery in London. (Note: The portrait is now in the University of Toronto Art Collection.) According to her biographer, Gottardo Pallastrelli, she appears melancholy, dreamy and hesitant – and pensive – likening the painting to Piero di Cosimo's Maria Maddalena. In London, very unusually for that time, she wore long oriental dresses, unlike the manner of American heiresses looking for an aristocratic husband.

Also in 1884, she met the 72-year-old Robert Browning who was to become a major source of inspiration for her in her poetry writing. (Note: Pallastrelli remarks that although "The Pied Piper of Hamlin" was easily accepted by a Victorian audience Browning's other work was difficult and only appreciated by a cultured reader.) Caroline all her life was in rather frail health having problems with her lungs so she moved to the spa town of Cauterets in the Hautes-Pyrénées and then, next year, returned to Litchfield. In 1888 she met Browning in both London and Venice, at that time his home. She specially marked in her diary these meetings as significant events. In 1889, she wrote to Browning that the next best thing to having a conversation with him was to write a long letter and wait for the pleasure of receiving his reply. Sadly, Browning died shortly afterwards, on December 12, 1889.

In 1888, the sixteen-year-old Bertrand Russell was at school with her younger brother Edward and he became a friend of the Fitzgerald family. Russell developed a romantic, though intellectual, attraction towards Caroline. Russell thought of her as "the ideal of young womanhood" and in her "I found liberalism in politics and religion, complete emancipation from vulgar prejudices, great culture and wide reading".

== Poetry ==
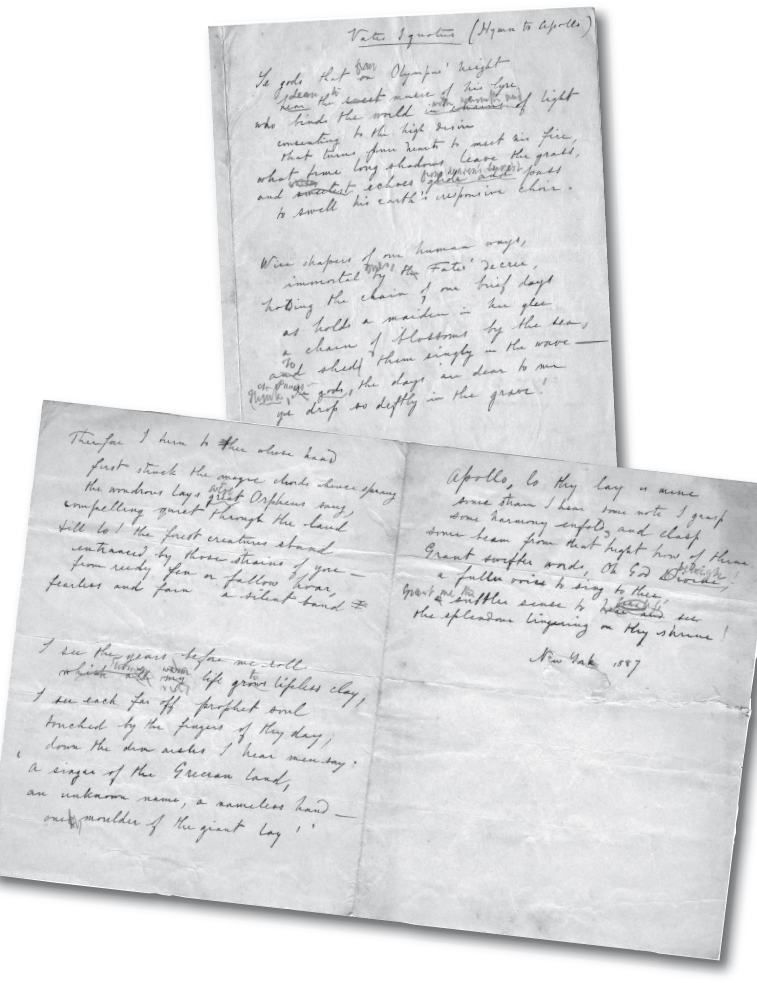
Vates Ignotus in Fitzgerald's manuscript, 1887

Fitzgerald first published a collection of her poems in 1889 under the title Venetia Victrix and Other Poems (Fitz Gerald 1889), dedicated "To my friend Robert Browning". (Note: On the title page her name is recorded as "Caroline Fitz Gerald". Generally there was considerable variation in how Fitzgerald was spelled.) A manuscript version of the first poem in the book, "Vates Ignotus", exists dated 1887 and it is certain that Browning read some of her poems. Her second volume of poetry in 1904 was also dedicated to him. The first stanza of "Vates Ignotus" is – (Note: Vates ignotus in Latin means "unknown poet" but vates is multiply ambiguous: it can mean a male or female poet and it can also mean prophet or soothsayer.)

Ye gods that, from Olympus' height,
Lean to the music of his lyre,
Who binds the world in links of light,
Consenting to the high desire
That turns pure hearts to meet his fire,
What time long shadows leave the grass,
And heaven's clear echoes cloudward pass
To swell his earth's responsive choir;

Oscar Wilde reviewed Venetia Victrix in an article he wrote: "Three New Poets" (Note: See also Wilde 1909. The other two volumes of poems reviewed were W. B. Yeats, "The Wanderings of Oisin and Other Poems", and Richard Le Gallienne, "Volumes in Folio".) in the Pall Mall Gazette. He approvingly noted Browning's influence and considered that "Venetia Victrix" "shows vigour, intellectual strength and courage". Wilde gave a lengthier review in The Woman's World magazine of which he was the editor. (Note: Wilde's The Woman's World had rather different aspirations from those of the 21st-century Woman's World.) One of the poems "Hymn to Persephone" was included in the 1996 anthology British Women Poets of the Nineteenth Century (Higonnet 1996) and has been discussed in relation to the mythological figure (Radford 2007).

== First marriage ==
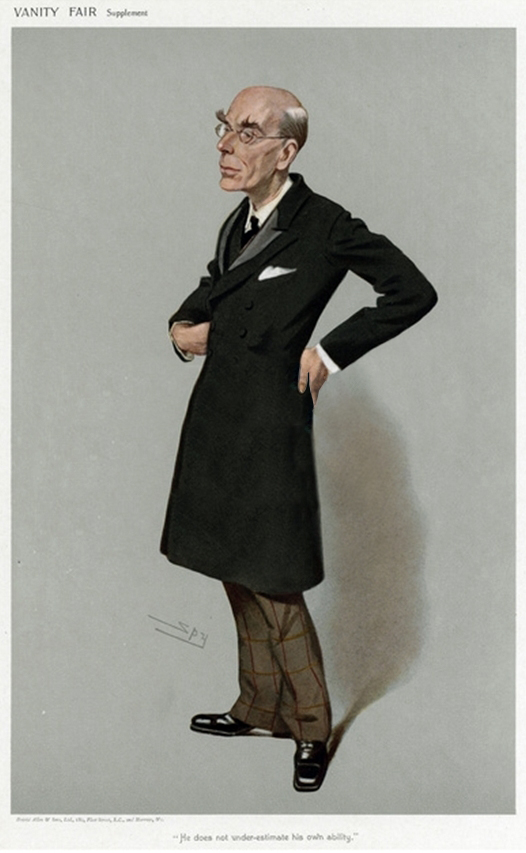
Edmond Fitzmaurice, 1906 ("Vanity Fair" caricature)

On November 23, 1889, she married Edmond George Fitzmaurice (styled Lord Fitzmaurice) (Note: ODNB gives the date of the marriage as November 23. Fitzmaurice was the second son of a marquess, hence his courtesy title. In 1906 he was raised to the peerage becoming Baron Fitzmaurice. "Edmond" was the usual spelling but "Edmund" was also used. "Fitzmaurice" sometimes had a capital "M") – he was 43 years old and she 24. Edmond had been educated at Eton and Cambridge and had been a Liberal party MP and junior minister though in 1889 he was out of office. It is likely they had met in Toronto when Fitzmaurice's elder brother Henry, Marquis of Landsdowne was Governor General of Canada between 1883 and 1888. From the start, the marriage was not a success and quite rapidly became a failure.

Fitzgerald's interests, her cultural interests, were completely unlike her husband's who enjoyed a country lifestyle with little intellectual stimulation. As time went by, they came to live separately, she in their London townhouse. She often wrote (sometimes in Italian) explaining her unhappiness to an old family friend James Lacaita who was living in Florence. Despite her distance from her husband, she remained on particularly good terms with her mother-in-law.

Similar differences of interests would have affected many Anglo-American society marriages but few ended in separation because of the scandal of divorce. (Note: Pallastrelli claims there were ninety Anglo-American marriages between 1870 and 1914 and only three ended in divorce.) However, Caroline was determined to be free again and, in particular, she had come to love Italy and wanted to live there. She set about getting her marriage nullified because, it was claimed, it had never been consummated.

According to English law, a marriage could not be annulled on grounds of non-consummation before it had lasted three years so in August 1894 Caroline went to court – her application was unopposed and a decree of nullity was made in October 1894 which became final in May 1895. (Note: The couple had no children. Edmond never remarried.) After the divorce, she sought to return some of her husband's family jewellery but his mother and aunt said they would like her to keep the jewels – nothing had happened that should make her not want to keep them and they wanted to avoid increasing her suffering.

In 1894, Russell had written to his fiancée Alys Pearsall Smith that, hearing of Caroline's impending divorce, he had always regretted Caroline's marriage and that "he couldn't help feeling a sort of joy to think she should get rid of him and start afresh". He supposed she married him for ambition rather than love. In Russell's 1967 autobiography, he also said that "later she seemed an unmitigated bore" – it may be that his sadness at her marriage still hurt.

== Henry James ==
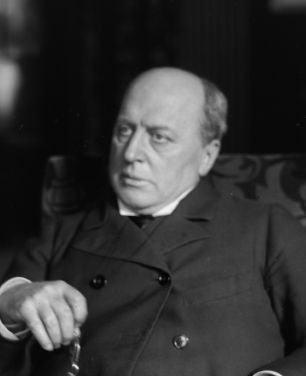
Henry James in about 1900

In the period leading up to her divorce, Fitzgerald was busy reading books and keeping up with current affairs and she undertook an intense correspondence with Fanny Reay, wife of Donald Mackay, 11th Lord Reay. Despite the age difference, the two women seemed to get on very well, sharing many interests and becoming close friends. From these letters it is clear Fitzgerald mixed with both aristocrats and intellectuals – at a reception at her publishers in 1895, she met the eminent author Henry James and in the next year, they started writing to each other regularly. James had already published his most famous novels and was undergoing a less successful phase with more experimental novels and plays. He was sometimes close to despair and no longer felt at home in London or its society. He contemplated leaving the capital finding he was happier enjoying the peace of the country at Rye whereas Fitzgerald enjoyed the social life of London.

== Life in Europe ==
Fitzgerald travelled around Europe for extended periods of time visiting the major cultural cities, particularly admiring the architecture of Florence. Throughout her travels, she met up with acquaintances, particularly American expatriates who welcomed her. In 1897, the cultural and intellectual environment of Rome intimidated her and when she met Max Müller, the German philosopher and orientalist, he told her his initial reaction had been the same. She became more confident in herself and as time went by, she appreciated more the joy brought to her by seeing different places and meeting different people – writers, painters, poets, intellectuals. Rome eventually became the city she preferred to live in.

In Florence, she met a young German archeologist, Georg Karo, who fell in love with her. She was happy for him to accompany her around, feeling safer with him than alone by herself and happy to meet his mother and sister. He introduced her to the new pastime of cycling. She became very attached to living in Rome, appreciating the cultural life, going to the opera, meeting many like-minded people.

=== Letters of Elizabeth Barrett Browning ===
Sir Frederic Kenyon was preparing a book on the letters of Elizabeth Barrett Browning for publication and he consulted Fitzgerald to get her insight on Robert Browning as a person. She enthusiastically joined in with the project, carrying out some literary research, helping with selecting the letters and visiting Robert and Elizabeth's old haunts. Kenyon acknowledged her help (as Lady Edmond Fitzmaurice) when the book (Kenyon 1897) was published in 1897. She continued corresponding with Kenyon for the rest of her life.

To illustrate the plane of criticism she could adopt, when Kenyon and Fitzgerald thought to collaborate on a possible biography of Robert Browning she wrote

I agree with you in thinking that this begins at a later period than these proofs have reached, only confirms my view that Elizabeth Barrett Browning began to exist when she knew the greater poet – and I am glad you have kept so many of the really rather dull early letters, for they prove that and form a document beyond the scope of anecdotal memoire.

After she had been back in England for a while she went to Florence where she visited the Brownings' old house Casa Guidi and, with the help of Karo, she was able to meet their only son Robert Barrett Browning.

== Filippo De Filippi and second marriage ==
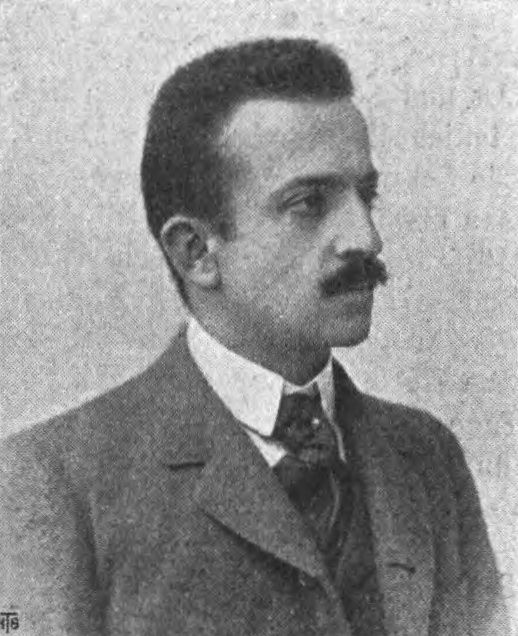
Filippo De Filippi in 1900

In early 1898, Fitzgerald met Filippo De Filippi, a mountaineer, explorer and professor of surgery at the University of Bologna. De Filippi was 28 years old and the previous year on an expedition with the Duke of the Abruzzi he had climbed Mount Saint Elias. (Note: Mount Saint Elias is in Alaska and it was the first time its summit had been reached. De Filippi wrote the expedition report (De Filippi & Sella 1900).) Fitzgerald met him when she went to a mountaineering lecture he gave in Rome. Shortly afterwards he went with Caroline's mother to a similar lecture given in London at the Royal Geographical Society given by her son Edward who was by then also a well-known mountaineer. (Note: Edward Fitzgerald had previous year attempted to climb Aconcagua in the South American Andes. A member of the party made a successful first ascent although Fitzgerald personally did not reach the summit.) As well as inviting De Filippi, Caroline had invited Henry James too but he was unable to attend – from a letter he wrote to her a few days later it is clear that she had told him she had made a new friendship with "De Filippi", someone "extremely interesting". James and Fitzgerald wrote to each other more and more frequently with the writer encouraging her to pursue her friendship with De Filippi even though she still had an affectionate relationship with Karo.

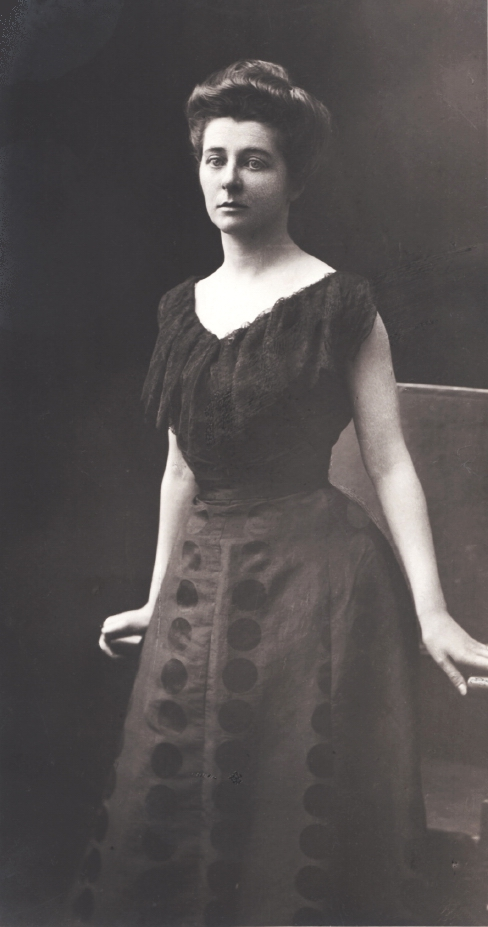
Caroline Fitzgerald in Florence

De Filippi felt overawed by her intellect and by the high society she kept. In May 1898, he wrote to his mother doubting he had any hope of marrying Caroline but over a couple of years they kept on meeting – with him telling her he was in love with her but she being unsure. By 1901 he was writing highly emotional love letters and was in despair when Caroline returned to England. Then, in May, she arranged a meeting with her mother and De Filippi and her mother approved of their marriage. De Filippi was now in the position of having to explain to his parents the reasons for Caroline's divorce, which he did by giving the example of the Ruskins. Other problems had to be overcome: the United States regarded Caroline as a British citizen and in Britain vice versa. Also by British custom she was still being called "Lady Edmond" and this was understood in Italy to mean that she was still a married woman. In August, they visited Scotland together and on September 3, 1901, they married and toured the Swiss Alps for their honeymoon.

The couple took a house in Rome and by 1902, they had bought a motor car for touring. They included Henry James on trips with them and he encouraged Edith Wharton to get a car as well, which she did in 1904.

Since her childhood in America, Fitzgerald had remained close to the Peskovs, a cosmopolitan Russian family who owned a castle in Salzburg. In 1903, with the Peskovs they travelled through Russia and the Caucasus to Turkestan including such places as Astrakhan, Bokhara, Samarkand and Tashkent and returning past the Black Sea and Crimea.

De Filippi was to have gone on a 1906 expedition to the Rwenzori Mountains on the Uganda/Congo border, again led by Abruzzi, but Caroline was ill after the Turkestan tour so he stayed at home with her. (Note: Although he did not go on the expedition, De Filippi did write the report (De Filippi & Abruzzi 1908) and Fitzgerald made the English translation (as Caroline De Filippi, née Fitzgerald).) In spite of her rather poor health, they still travelled extensively in Europe and in 1907 met Edith Wharton in Paris.

In 1909, Abruzzi again invited De Filippi on an expedition, this time to the Baltoro Glacier, near K2 in the Karakoram. Caroline travelled with him as far as Kashmir, sailing on the SS Oceana. She stayed at Srinigar and later Gulmarg while she waited for the expedition to return, before they travelled on together through Ladakh. For the massive two volume report (De Filippi & Abruzzi 1912), Fitzgerald was one of the translators for the English edition.

== Death and assessment ==
Weakened by her travels and suffering from pneumonia, Fitzgerald died on December 25, 1911, at her home in Rome after a prolonged illness. (Note: It seems most likely she was suffering from malaria.) While she is commemorated in a plaque with De Filippi at the Protestant Cemetery in Rome, near to Shelley's grave, she is buried in her hometown of Litchfield, Connecticut, in the East Cemetery. De Filippi wrote to his friend, the explorer Aurel Stein, that his life no longer made sense and that he was shattered. According to Tom Longstaff writing De Filippi's own obituary in 1938 he never got over his wife's death. All the same, he worked unceasingly, planning a large and very successful Kashmir–Baltistan–Ladakh expedition he led during 1913 and 1914.

Moving between The Gilded Age and La Belle Époque, according to her biographer, Fitzgerald's life strikingly resembled that of some of Henry James's American female protagonists in his novels – Christina Light in Roderick Hudson (1875) and The Princess Casamassima (1886); the eponymous Daisy Miller (1878); Isabel Archer in The Portrait of a Lady (1880) and Milly Theale in The Wings of the Dove (1902). These women took responsibility for the choices they had personally made and lived their lives with a lack of compromise.
