= Boléro (Chopin) =

1833 piano piece by Frédéric Chopin

Chopin's Boléro, interpreted by Christoph Zbinden

The Boléro, Op. 19, is a short piano work written by Frédéric Chopin in 1833 and published in 1834. It is one of his lesser-known piano pieces, although it has been recorded numerous times.

== Structure ==
The overall key of the Boléro is difficult to establish. It was often listed as Boléro in C major - A minor, as the work opens with three unison octaves in G (dominant of C major) in fortissimo, then a lengthy introduction in C major, moving to A minor (the relative minor of C major) for the Boléro proper. This is interrupted by sections in A major, A♭ major and B♭ minor before returning to A minor. It ends triumphantly in A major (parallel major of A minor).

== Composition ==
The work was dedicated to the Scottish-born but half-French Mademoiselle la Comtesse Émilie de Flahaut, then aged only 14, and a pupil of Chopin's. She was later to become Countess of Shelburne. The apparent inspiration for the Boléro was Chopin's friendship with the French soprano Pauline Viardot, whose father, the famed Spanish tenor Manuel García, had introduced boleros to Paris by the time of Chopin's arrival there. His biographer Frederick Niecks speculated that it was inspired by the Bolero in Daniel Auber's La muette de Portici (1828). Despite the ostensibly Spanish flavour of the piece, it has often been described as a polonaise in disguise, or a boléro à la polonaise, as its rhythms are more redolent of the national dance of Chopin's homeland than anything Spanish. It was written five years before Chopin first visited Spain in 1838.
