= Meikleour =

Village in Perth and Kinross, Scotland

Coordinates: 56°32′25″N 3°22′18″W

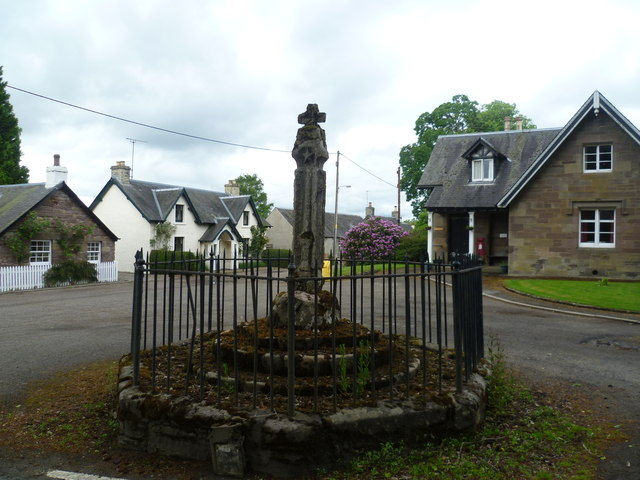
- The mercat cross, Meikleour

- Location within Perth and Kinross
- OS grid reference: NO157395
  - Edinburgh: 41 mi (66 km)
  - London: 372 mi (599 km)
- Council area: Perth and Kinross
- Lieutenancy area: Perth and Kinross
- Country: Scotland
- Sovereign state: United Kingdom
- Police: Scotland
- Fire: Scottish
- Ambulance: Scottish
- UK Parliament: Angus and Perthshire Glens
- Scottish Parliament: Perthshire North

Meikleour (/mɪˈklʊər/ mi-KLOOR) is a village in Perth and Kinross, Scotland. It lies near the confluence of the Tay and the Isla in the valley of Strathmore, 12 miles (19 km) north of Perth and 4 miles (6.4 km) south of Blairgowrie. It is in the parish of Caputh.

Meikleour is home to the Meikleour Beech Hedge, which was planted in 1746. The hedge is said to be the longest and tallest in the world and runs alongside the A93 road from Perth to Blairgowrie. The hedge is on the edge of the estate of Meikleour House, which itself is designated as an outstanding level of interest environment by Historic Environment Scotland. A substantial Neolithic cursus called Cleaven Dyke is nearby. The Meikleour Arms, on an Old Military Road, is a Category B listed building dating to 1820.

Other features of the village include a 17th century mercat cross and a tron, complete with jougs for detaining offenders.
