= Meikleour Arms =

Hotel in Perth and Kinross, Scotland

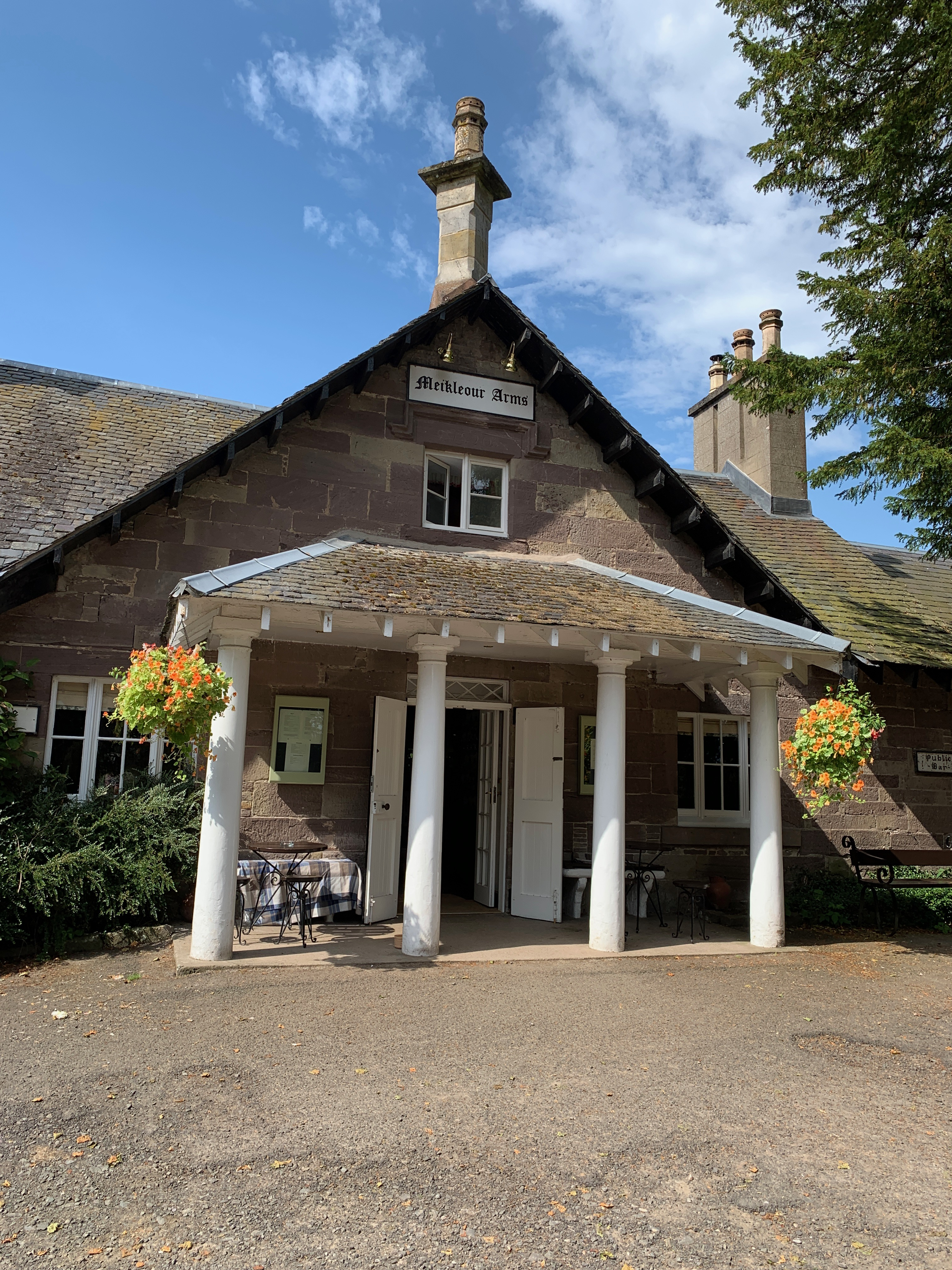
- The south porch, with its Roman Doric columns
- Interactive map of the Meikleour Arms area

General information
- Location: Old Military Road, Meikleour, Scotland
- Coordinates: 56.541684°N 3.371666°W
- Completed: 1820 (206 years ago)

Technical details
- Floor count: 2

Meikleour Arms (also known as the Meikleour Arms Hotel) is a Category B listed building in Meikleour, Perth and Kinross, Scotland. It dates to 1820, and is a single-storey building, built mostly of ashlar stone.

In 2022, the hotel was awarded the Guest Accommodation of the Year for Scotland award by The AA.

== See also ==
- List of listed buildings in Perth and Kinross
