= Charles, Comte de Flahaut =

French general and statesman (1785–1870)

Charles
- Comte de Flahaut
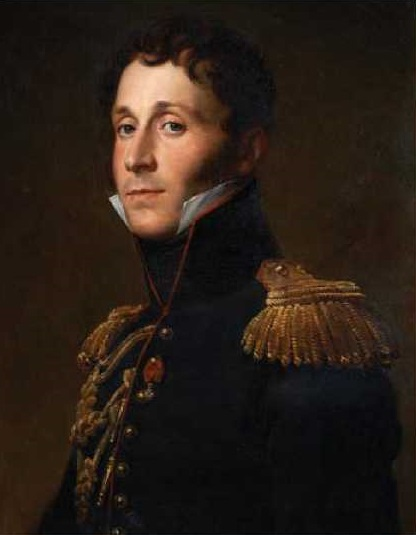
- Charles, Comte of Flahaut
- Born: 21 April 1785; Paris, France
- Died: 1 September 1870 (aged 85); Paris, France
- Residence: Hôtel de Massa
- Noble family: House of Flahaut
- Spouse: Margaret Mercer Elphinstone, 2nd Baroness Keith and 7th Lady Nairne (m. 1817; died 1867)
- Issue among others...: Charles, Duc de Morny (illegitimate); Emily Petty-Fitzmaurice, Marchioness of Lansdowne; Georgiana, Marquise of La Valette
- Parents: Charles-François de Flahaut; Charles Maurice de Talleyrand-Périgord (biological father); Adelaide Filleul, Marquise de Souza-Botelho (mother)

Auguste Charles Joseph de Flahaut de La Billarderie, Comte de Flahaut (French pronunciation: [oɡyst ʃaʁl ʒozɛf də flao də la bijaʁdəʁi]; 21 April 1785 – 1 September 1870) was a French general during the Napoleonic Wars, a senator, and later in his life, a French ambassador to the Court of St James's. He had a son with Napoleon's stepdaughter, Hortense de Beauharnais.

== Biography ==
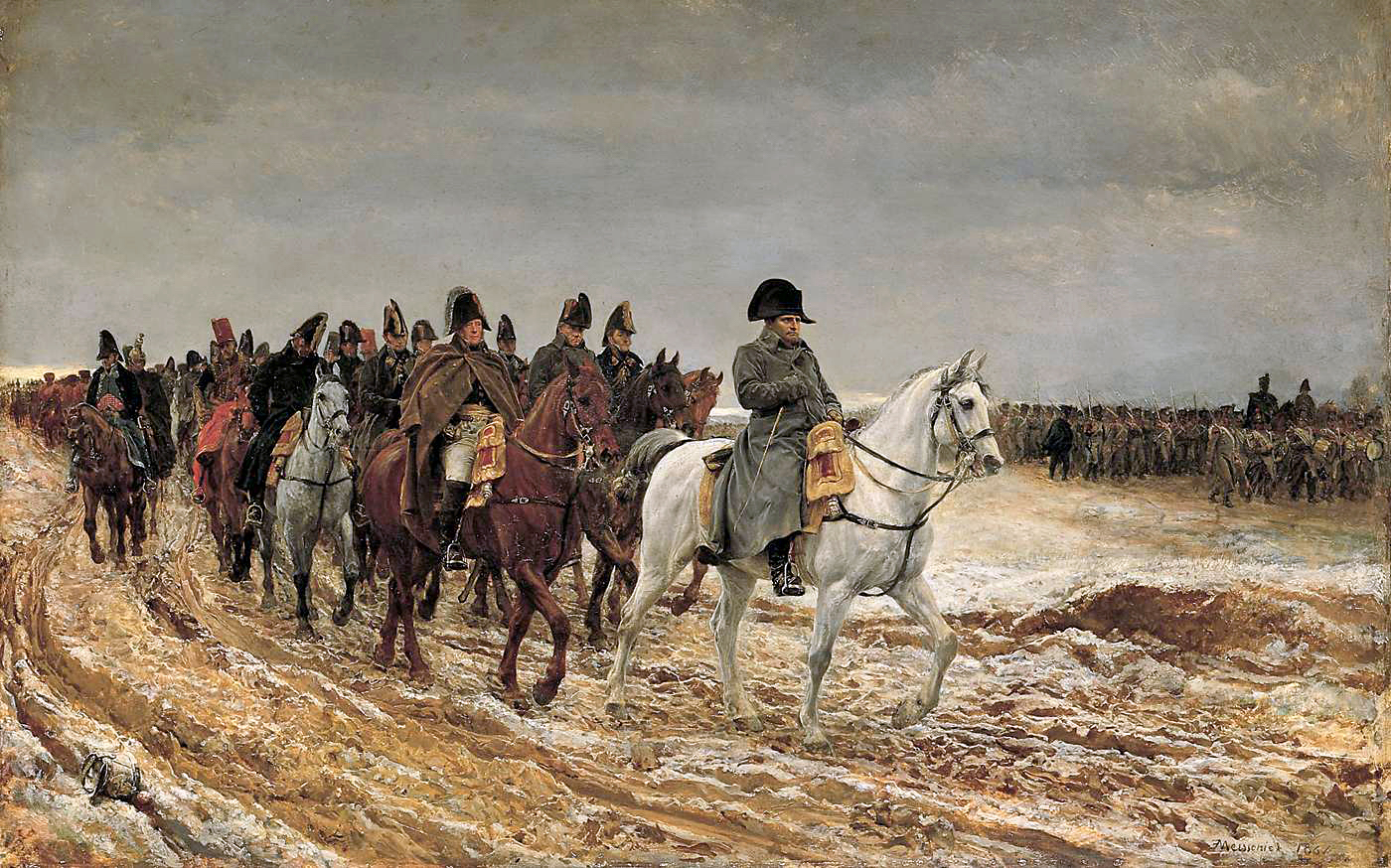
Painting of Ernest Meissonier in 1814, Battle of Laon, Napoleon returning with his three generals from left to right, Michel Ney, Louis-Alexandre Berthier, and Charles, comte de Flahaut

He was born in Paris, officially the son of maréchal de camp Charles-François de Flahaut de La Billarderie, comte de Flahaut (second son of Charles-César, marquis de La Billarderie) who was guillotined at Arras in February 1793, and his wife, Adélaïde Filleul. The first wife of his father was Françoise-Louise Poisson, sister of the Marquise de Pompadour of Château de Menars.

However, Charles de Flahaut was generally recognized to be the offspring of his mother's liaison with Talleyrand, with whom he was closely connected throughout his life. His mother took him with her into exile in 1792, and they remained abroad until 1798, moving from England to Switzerland (where she is rumoured to have "become involved" with Louis-Philippe, then Duke of Orleans), before Hamburg where she met her second husband, Ambassador Dom José Maria do Carmo de Sousa Botelho Mourão e Vasconcelos, 5.º Morgado de Mateus.

Charles de Flahaut volunteered for military service joining the cavalry in 1800, and received his army commission after the Battle of Marengo. He was appointed Aide-de-camp to Joachim Murat, 1st Prince Murat, was present at the Battle of Austerlitz, and was wounded at the Battle of Landbach in 1805. At the same time, Flahaut was involved in a liaison with Napoleon's younger sister, Caroline Bonaparte.

At Warsaw he met Anne Poniatowska, Countess Potocka with whom he quickly became intimate. After the Battle of Friedland, he was awarded the Legion of Honour and returned to Paris in 1807. He served in Spain in 1808, and then in Germany, reaching the rank of Colonel in that campaign. After the Battle of Wagram, general Louis-Alexandre Berthier made him his Aide-de-camp, leaving the staff of Murat, and awarded him the empty title of Baron of the Empire.

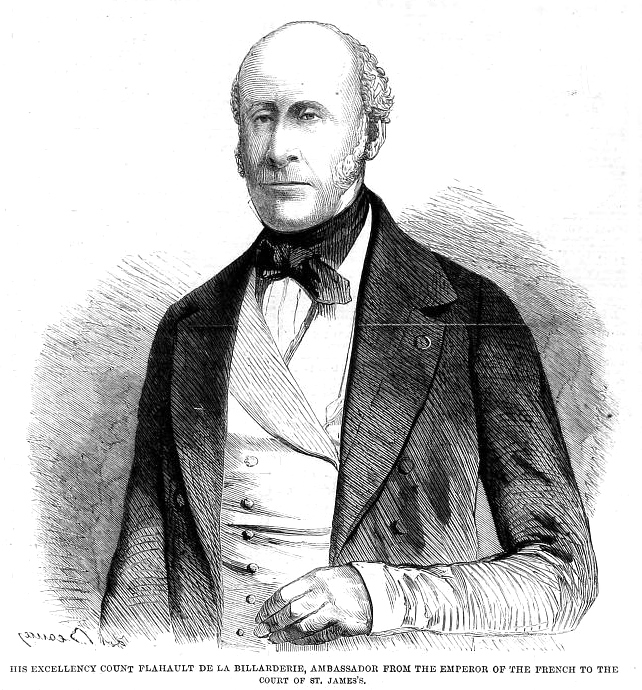
S.E. le comte de Flahaut when French Imperial Ambassador to London

Meanwhile, the Countess Potocka had established herself in Paris, but Flahaut had by this time entered into a relationship with Hortense de Beauharnais, wife of Emperor Napoleon's younger brother and King of Holland Louis Bonaparte; the birth of their son was registered in Paris on 21 October 1811 as Charles-Auguste-Louis-Joseph Demorny, later created Duc de Morny. Hortense was the daughter of Empress Josephine, and stepdaughter and sister-in-law of Napoleon.

Comte Charles de Flahaut's arms

Flahaut fought with distinction in the Russian Campaign of 1812 and took part in the French occupation of Moscow. In 1813, he was appointed Brigadier-General and Aide-de-camp to Emperor Napoleon, being promoted, after the Battle of Leipzig, as a Général de division and Adjutant general. In 1813, he was selected to meet the King of Saxony and conduct him to his capital. After the Battle of Dresden, he was made Count by Napoleon, and fought at the Battle of Hanau against the Bavarians.

After Napoleon's abdication in 1814, he submitted to the new French government, but was placed on the retired list in September. He refused to betray Napoleon despite the efforts of the Bourbons to rally him in their service. Flahaut was assiduous in his attendance on Queen Hortense de Beauharnais until the Hundred Days brought him back into active service. With the return of Napoleon from the island of Elba, Flahaut joined his campaign to Paris and was placed in charge of reforming the army to the Emperor's standard.

A mission to Vienna to secure the return of Empress Marie-Louise of the House of Habsburg-Lorraine resulted in failure. He was present at the Battle of Waterloo (as an Aide-de-camp to Napoleon), and afterwards sought to place Napoleon II on the throne. He was spared exile due to an intervention by Talleyrand, but was placed under police surveillance. Flahaut then chose to leave for Germany, and thence to Britain.

The Flahauts returned to France in 1827 and, in 1830, King Louis-Philippe of the House of Bourbon-Orléans promoted the Count to the rank of Lieutenant-General as well as creating him a Peer of France. He remained a staunch supporter of Talleyrand's policies, and in 1831 served briefly as French Ambassador to Berlin. Subsequently, he was attached to the household of Ferdinand-Philippe of France, Duke of Orléans and, in 1841, was posted as Ambassador to Vienna, where he remained until 1848, when he was dismissed and retired from army service.

After the Coup d'état of 1851 by Napoleon III, his services were re-engaged, and from 1860 to 1862 he served in Britain as French Ambassador to the Court of St James's under Queen Victoria.

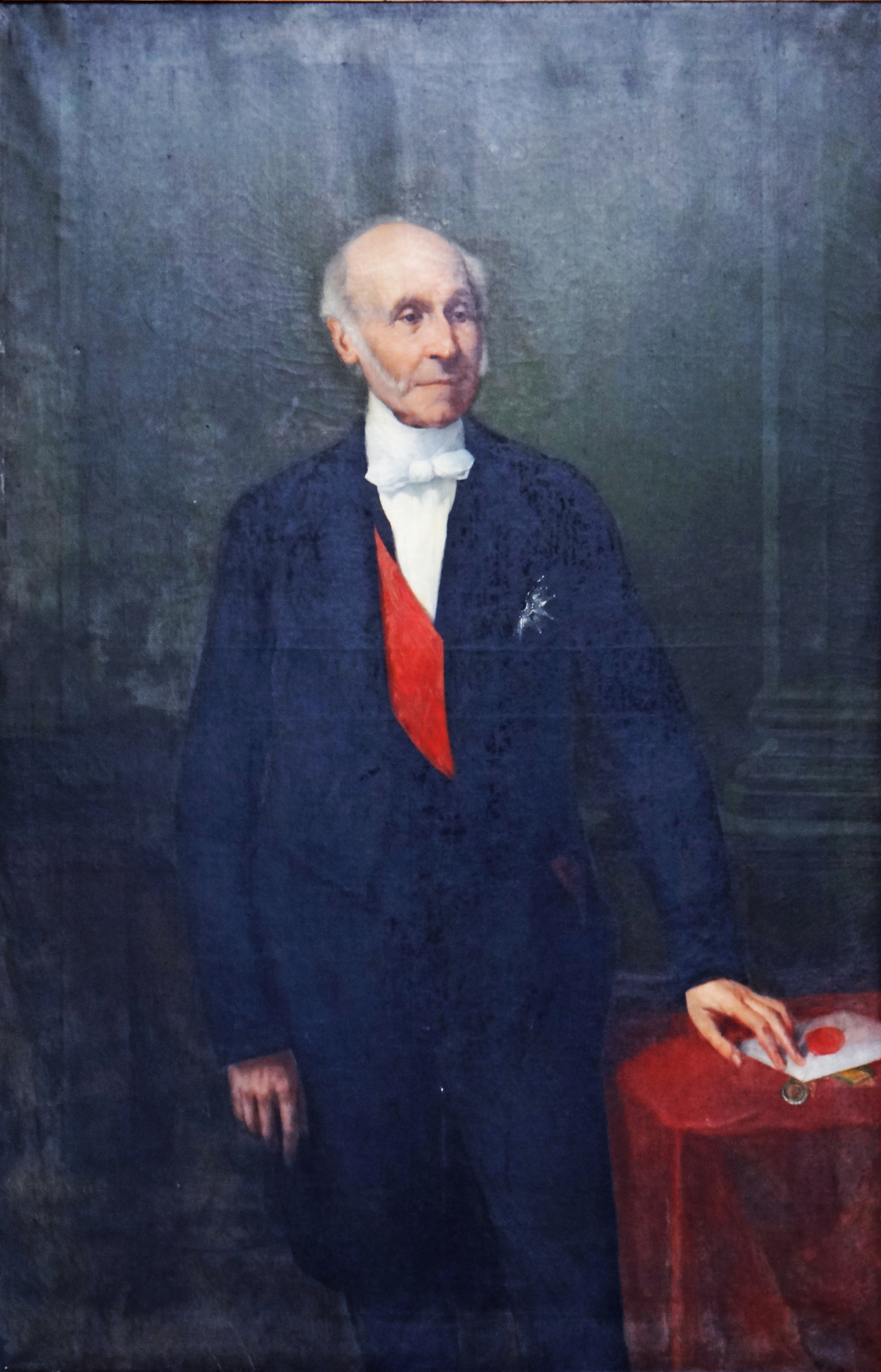
Portrait of Charles de Flahaut, Grand Chancellor of the Legion of Honour

In 1852, he became a Senator of the Second French Empire, and in 1854, he became a member of the Commission appointed to edit the works of Napoleon I. In 1864, the Flahauts returned to Paris and took up residence at the Hôtel de Salm, when Charles was appointed Grand Chancellor of the Legion of Honour. He died in Paris on 1 September 1870.

In the opinion of the unnamed author of a biography on Flahaut in the Encyclopædia Britannica Eleventh Edition: "The comte de Flahaut is perhaps better remembered for his exploits in gallantry, and the elegant manners in which he had been carefully trained by his mother, than for his public services, which were not, however, so inconsiderable as they have sometimes been represented to be".

== Family ==
Flahaut was the lover of Napoleon's stepdaughter, Hortense de Beauharnais (Queen of Holland), with whom he had an illegitimate son, Charles de Morny (1811–1865) who later became Duc de Morny and married Sophia Sergeyevna Trubetskaya, a Russian princess of the House of Trubetskoy.

While in Britain, de Flahaut married in Edinburgh on 20 June 1817 Hon. Margaret Mercer Elphinstone (1788–1867), daughter of Admiral George Elphinstone, 1st Viscount Keith; she succeeded, in her own right, as 2nd Baroness Keith in 1823 and 7th Lady Nairne in 1837.

They had five daughters:

- Emily Jane de Flahaut (16 May 1819 – 25 June 1895), married on 1 November 1843 to Henry Petty-Fitzmaurice, 4th Marquess of Lansdowne
- Clémentine de Flahaut (29 April 1821 – 5 January 1836), died unmarried
- Georgiana Gabrielle de Flahaut (1822 – 16 July 1907), married on 2 February 1871 to Jean Charles Marie Félix, Marquis de La Valette
- Adélaïde Joséphine Elisabeth de Flahaut (1824 – 3 April 1841), died unmarried
- Sarah Sophie Louise de Flahaut (1825 – 10 June 1853), died unmarried

== Honours ==
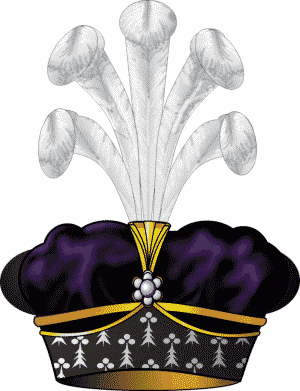
- Count of the Empire
- Grand-Cross of the Légion d'honneur
- Grand Cordon of the Order of Leopold
- Commander of the Military Order of St. Henry, 1st Class, 1813
- Grand Cross of the Saxe-Ernestine House Order, March 1843

== Sources ==
- Chisholm, Hugh, ed. (1911b), "Morny, Charles Auguste Louis Joseph, Duc de" , Encyclopædia Britannica, vol. 18 (11th ed.), Cambridge University Press, pp. 849–850
- Martin, Alexander M. (2022). From the Holy Roman Empire to the Land of the Tsars: One Family's Odyssey, 1768-1870. Oxford, United Kingdom: Oxford University Press. ISBN 9780192844378.
- Mosley, Charles, ed. (2003), Burke's Peerage, Baronetage & Knightage, vol. 1 (107th in three volumes ed.), Wilmington, Delaware: Burke's Peerage (Genealogical Books), p. 1314
- Siborne, William (1895), The Waterloo Campaign, 1815 (4th ed.), Westminster: A. Constable

Attribution:
