= Margaret Mercer Elphinstone =

Scottish society hostess (1788–1867)

Margaret de Flahaut, Comtesse de Flahaut
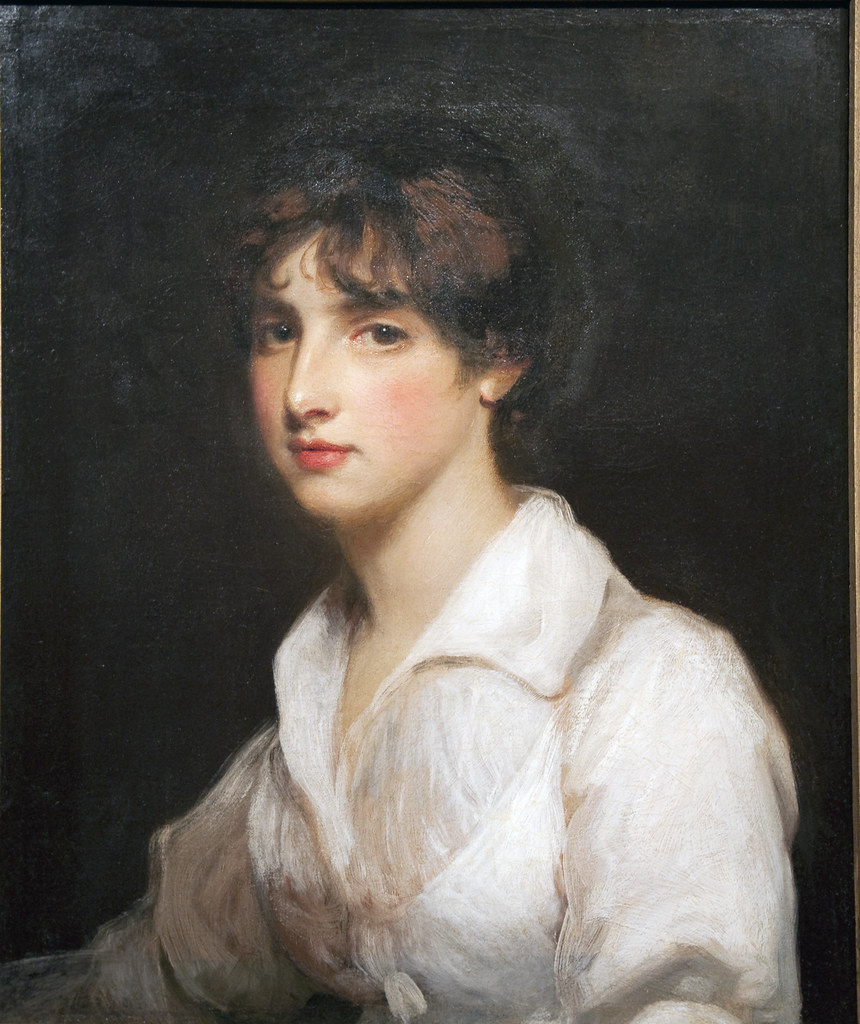
- Margaret Mercer Elphinstone by John Hoppner
- Born: Margaret Mercer Elphinstone; 12 June 1788; Mayfair, London, England
- Died: 11 November 1867 (aged 79); Paris, French Second Empire
- Occupations: Artist and society hostess
- Spouse: Charles de Flahaut de La Billarderie, Comte de Flahaut (m. 1817)
- Children: Emily Petty-Fitzmaurice, Marchioness of Lansdowne; Clémentine de Flahaut; Georgiana Gabrielle, Marquise de La Valette; Adélaïde Joséphine Elisabeth de Flahaut; Sarah Sophie Louise de Flahaut
- Parents: George Elphinstone, 1st Viscount Keith (father); Jane Mercer (mother)

Margaret de Flahaut, Comtesse de Flahaut, 2nd Baroness Keith and 7th Lady Nairne (born Hon. Margaret Mercer Elphinstone; 12 June 1788 – 11 November 1867), was a Scottish society hostess.

== Biography ==
Margaret, was born in Mayfair on 12 June 1788, the only child of George Elphinstone, 1st Viscount Keith, admiral, and his first wife, Jane, only child and heiress of William Mercer of Aldie, Perth. Upon her mother's death in 1789 she became heiress to the lordship of Nairne (then in attainder) and later succeeded to the title.

Margaret was introduced at a young age to the circle of the Princess Charlotte of Wales, to whom she became attached and a close confidante; and this position raised a rumour against her (which, however, she was able entirely to refute) that she betrayed the Princess's secrets to the Prince Regent.

On 20 June 1817, at Edinburgh, Margaret married Charles, Comte de Flahaut, aide-de-camp to Napoleon, who had been educated in Britain, where he took refuge during the Bourbon Restoration. The Comtesse held a prominent place in society since her husband held office under King Louis-Philippe I and later under Emperor Napoleon III, and was ambassador to Vienna, and (1860) to the Court of St. James's (London), and finally resided at Paris as Grand Chancellor of the Légion d'Honneur. The Comtesse, who was also one of the lady patronesses of Almack's, took part in all his social and political work. She was a prolific and perspicacious letter writer, and much of her correspondence is held at the Archives nationales, in Paris.

The Comtesse died at the Palais de la Légion d'Honneur in Paris, on 11 November 1867. Her eldest daughter, Emily, succeeded her as Lady Nairne.

== Notes ==
Peerage of Scotland
Preceded by William Murray Nairne	Lady Nairne; 1837–1867	Succeeded by Emily Petty-Fitzmaurice
Peerage of Ireland
Preceded by George Elphinstone	Baroness Keith; 1823–1867	Extinct
Peerage of the United Kingdom
Preceded by George Elphinstone	Baroness Keith; 1823–1867	Extinct
