= John Beresford, 8th Marquess of Waterford =

Irish peer

The Most Honourable The Marquess of Waterford

Personal details
- Born: 14 July 1933
- Died: 11 February 2015 (aged 81)
- Spouse: Lady Caroline Wyndham-Quin (m. 1957)
- Children: 4, including Henry Beresford, 9th Marquess of Waterford
- Parents: John Beresford, 7th Marquess of Waterford (father); Juliet Lindsay (mother)
- Relatives: Lord Patrick Beresford (brother)

John Hubert de la Poer Beresford, 8th Marquess of Waterford (14 July 1933 – 11 February 2015) was an Irish peer. He succeeded to the marquessate in 1934. He was educated at Eton, and later served as a lieutenant in the Royal Horse Guards' Supplementary Reserve.

== Biography ==
A highly skilled horseman, Lord Waterford rode the first of his many point-to-point winners while still at Eton, and he went on to become the youngest-ever member of the Irish Turf Club. From 1960 to 1985, he was captain of the All-Ireland Polo Club and its highest handicap player. For 12 years (1960–72) he was a member, at both medium and high-goal levels, of the Duke of Edinburgh's Windsor Park team, which won the British open championship for the Cowdray Park Gold Cup twice, and on another occasion the high-goal Warwickshire Cup.

After retiring from the Army, Lord Waterford returned to Curraghmore and became director of a number of enterprises to provide local employment, among them the Munster Chipboard company, Waterford Properties (a hotel group) and, later, Kenmare Resources, an Irish oil and gas exploration company. He was a founder patron of the Waterford International Festival of Light Opera.

He died on 11 February 2015 at the age of 81 and was succeeded by his son, Henry Beresford (b. 1958).

== Family ==
In 1957 he married Lady Caroline Olein Geraldine Wyndham-Quin, daughter of the 6th Earl of Dunraven and Mount-Earl. The couple had three sons and a daughter:

- Henry Nicholas de la Poer Beresford, 9th Marquess of Waterford (born 23 March 1958)
- Lord Charles Richard de la Poer Beresford (born 18 January 1960)
- Lord James Patrick de la Poer Beresford (born 10 December 1965)
- Lady Alice Rose de la Poer Beresford (born 31 July 1970)

His family seats were Curraghmore, Portlaw, County Waterford, and Glenbridge Lodge, Valleymount, County Wicklow.

== Ancestry ==
Ancestors of John Beresford, 8th Marquess of Waterford

16. John Beresford, 4th Marquess of Waterford
8. John Beresford, 5th Marquess of Waterford
17. Christiana Leslie
4. Henry Beresford, 6th Marquess of Waterford
18. Henry Somerset, 8th Duke of Beaufort
9. Lady Blanche Somerset
19. Lady Georgiana Curzon
2. John Beresford, 7th Marquess of Waterford
20. Henry Petty-Fitzmaurice, 4th Marquess of Lansdowne
10. Henry Petty-Fitzmaurice, 5th Marquess of Lansdowne
21. Emily de Flahaut
5. Lady Beatrix Petty-FitzMaurice
22. James Hamilton, 1st Duke of Abercorn
11. Lady Maud Hamilton
23. Lady Louisa Russell
1. John Beresford, 8th Marquess of Waterford
24. George Lindsay
12. Henry Lindsay
25. Lady Mary Gore
6. David Lindsay
26. Charles Morgan, 1st Baron Tredegar
13. The Hon. Ellen Morgan
27. Rosamund Mundy
3. Juliet Lindsay
14. George Miller
7. Grace Miller

Peerage of Ireland
Preceded by John Beresford	Marquess of Waterford; 1934–2015	Succeeded by Henry Beresford
