= John Beresford, 7th Marquess of Waterford =

Irish peer (1901–1934)

The Most Honourable The Marquess of Waterford
- The 7th Marquess of Waterford
- Born: 6 January 1901; Curraghmore, County Waterford, Ireland
- Died: 25 September 1934 (aged 33); Curraghmore, County Waterford, Ireland
- Education: Winchester College; Trinity College, Cambridge
- Spouse: Juliet Lindsay (m. 1930)
- Children: John Beresford, 8th Marquess of Waterford; Lord Patrick Beresford
- Parent(s): Henry Beresford, 6th Marquess of Waterford; Lady Beatrix Petty-Fitzmaurice

John Charles de la Poer Beresford, 7th Marquess of Waterford (6 January 1901 – 25 September 1934), styled Earl of Tyrone until 1911, was an Irish peer and soldier.

== Biography ==
Beresford was the eldest son of Henry de la Poer Beresford, 6th Marquess of Waterford, and Lady Beatrix Frances Petty-Fitzmaurice, daughter of Henry Petty-FitzMaurice, 5th Marquess of Lansdowne, Viceroy and Governor-General of Canada and India, respectively. He was educated at Winchester College and Trinity College, Cambridge. In 1924, he was commissioned as a Lieutenant in the Royal Regiment of Horse Guards.

Lord Waterford died in a shooting accident in the gun room at the family seat, Curraghmore House, near Portlaw, County Waterford, aged only 33. He was succeeded in the Marquessate by his infant son.

== Family ==
Lord Waterford married Juliet Mary Lindsay (1904–1987), daughter of Major David Balcarres Lindsay, on 14 October 1930 at St George's, Hanover Square. They had two children:

- John Hubert de la Poer Beresford (14 July 1933 – 12 February 2015), who would eventually succeed as the 8th Marquess of Waterford
- Lord Patrick Tristam de la Poer Beresford (16 June 1934 – 18 March 2020)

Peerage of Ireland
Preceded by Henry Beresford	Marquess of Waterford; 1911–1934	Succeeded by John Beresford
