= Blanche Girouard =

Journalist and writer

Lady Blanche Girouard
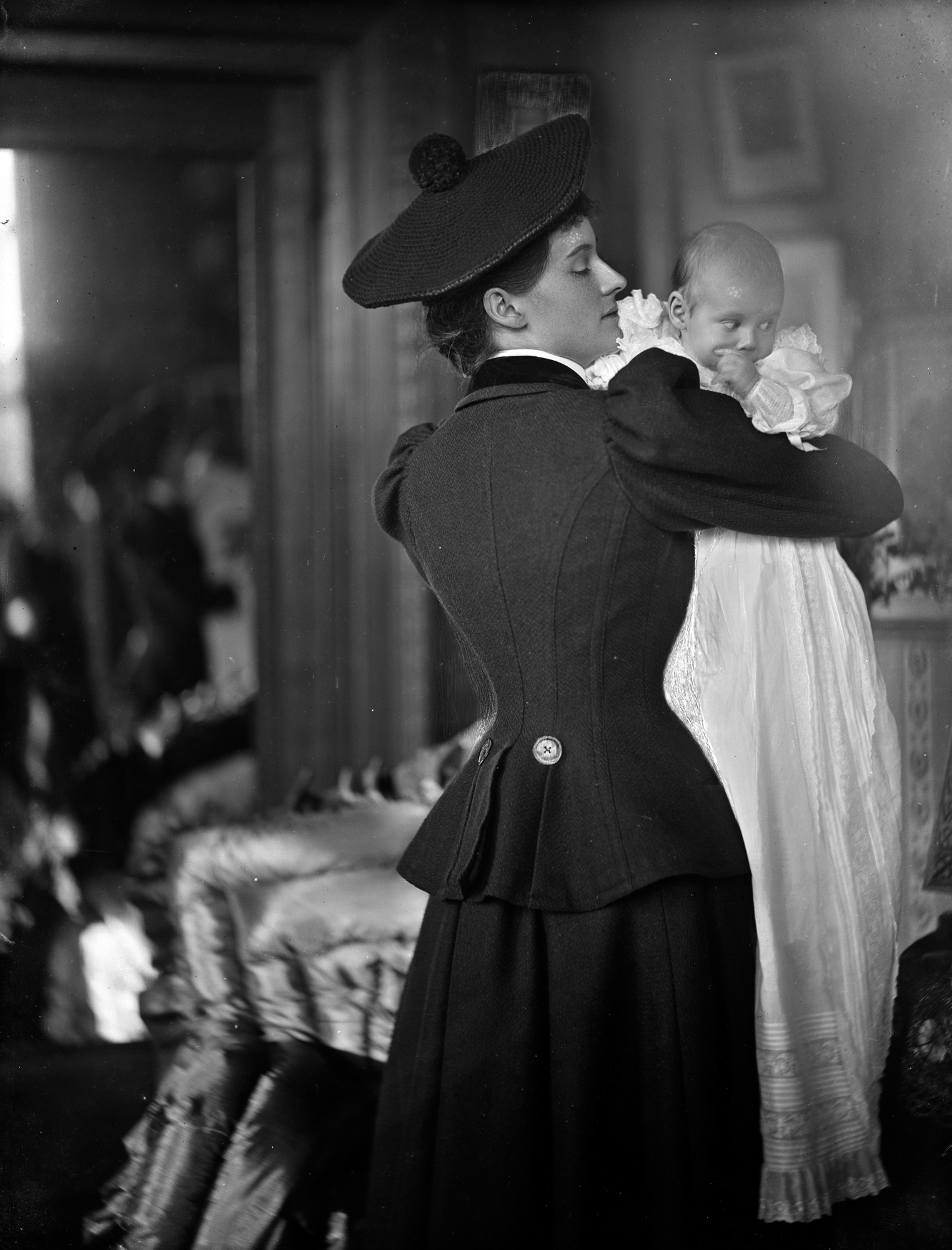
- Lady Blanche as an infant with her mother, the Marchioness of Waterford.
- Born: Blanche Maud de la Poer Beresford; 13 October 1898; London, United Kingdom
- Died: 29 September 1940 (aged 41)
- Spouse: Richard Girouard (m. 1927)
- Issue: Mark Girouard
- Father: Henry Beresford, 6th Marquess of Waterford
- Mother: Lady Beatrix Petty-FitzMaurice
- Occupation: Writer, journalist

Lady Blanche Maud de la Poer Beresford Girouard (13 October 1898 – 29 September 1940) was an Irish journalist and writer. She was the eldest child of the 6th Marquess of Waterford.

== Life ==
She was born Blanche Maud de la Poer Beresford to Henry Beresford, 6th Marquess of Waterford, and Lady Beatrix Frances Petty-FitzMaurice on 13 October 1898 in London. She grew up in Curraghmore, Portlaw, County Waterford. Girouard married Major Richard Desiré Girouard on 26 October 1927 at Westminster Cathedral. They had three children, one of whom was the historian and writer Mark Girouard. Girouard died as the result of a car accident in 1940 and is buried in Molesey Cemetery, Surrey. She made the news in 1929 when she converted to Catholicism.

Girouard wrote novels and short stories. She was also a contributor to newspapers such as The Evening News. A book of her stories and one novel were published before she died. A reviewer in Brisbane described the novel thus: "as to the manner of the writing there is only one verdict possible; It is a thing of beauty, the beauty of pure language, of poetic thought, and of idyllic Imagery". The writing style of her book of stories received similar praise.

== Bibliography ==
- The Story of Keth (1928)
- The World is for the Young (1935)
