= Lord Charles Cavendish (1905–1944) =

British banker and noble

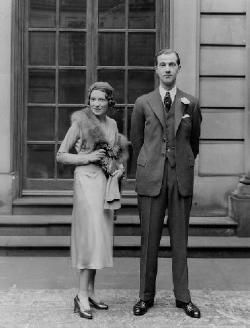
- Adele and Charles Cavendish (1932)
- Born: 29 August 1905; Cark-in-Cartmel, Lancashire
- Died: 23 March 1944 (aged 38); Lismore Castle, County Waterford, Ireland
- Burial place: Lismore Cathedral
- Spouse: Adele Astaire (m. 1932)
- Parent(s): Victor Cavendish, 9th Duke of Devonshire; Lady Evelyn Petty-FitzMaurice

Lord Charles Arthur Francis Cavendish (29 August 1905 – 23 March 1944) was the second son of Victor Cavendish, 9th Duke of Devonshire and his wife, Lady Evelyn Petty-FitzMaurice. Married to American dancer Adele Astaire, he died young of alcoholism.

== Biography ==
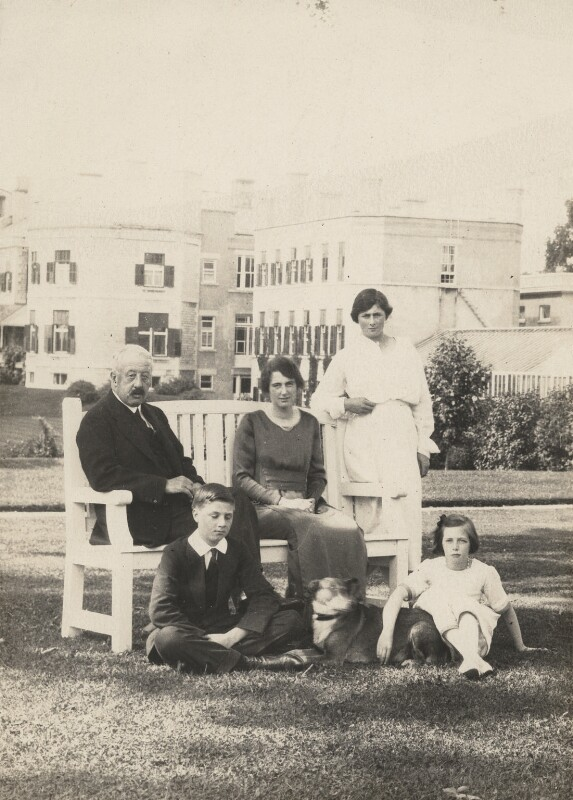
The 9th Duke of Devonshire in 1919 with four of his children, including Lord Charles (seated, bottom left)

Cavendish was born in 1905 at Holker Hall, Lancashire, the sixth child and second son of Victor Cavendish and Lady Evelyn Cavendish. At the time of his birth, his father was M.P. for West Derbyshire. His mother was the daughter of statesman Henry Petty-Fitzmaurice, 5th Marquess of Lansdowne, Viceroy of India and Governor General of Canada.

In 1908, his father succeeded his uncle as the 9th Duke of Devonshire. He grew up at the family seats, Chatsworth House in Derbyshire, Lismore Castle in Ireland, and Devonshire House in Mayfair.

He was educated at St Cyprian's School, Eastbourne, Eton, and at Trinity College, Cambridge. He joined the Royal Tank Regiment where he became a Lieutenant.

== Marriage ==
Cavendish was first introduced to dancer and actress Adele Astaire in London in 1927, on the closing night of her show Funny Face. He courted her while he worked for the bank J.P. Morgan & Co. in New York City. Astaire proposed to Cavendish at the 21 Club in Manhattan. They were married in 1932, at his family seat of Chatsworth House in Derbyshire. Their children included a daughter born in 1933 and twin sons born in 1935 – lived only a few hours. The couple lived at Lismore Castle in County Waterford, Ireland, which had been given to them as a wedding present by Cavendish's father, the 9th Duke of Devonshire.

== Death ==
Cavendish died at Lismore Castle, aged 38, of long-term acute alcoholism and was buried at Lismore Cathedral. A clause in his will stipulated that Lismore Castle was to go to his nephew, Lord Andrew Cavendish (later the 11th Duke of Devonshire), if Adele remarried, which she did in 1947.

== Ancestry ==
Ancestors of Lord Charles Cavendish (1905–1944)

16. Hon. William Cavendish
8. William Cavendish, 7th Duke of Devonshire
17. Louisa O'Callaghan
4. Lord Edward Cavendish
18. George Howard, 6th Earl of Carlisle
9. Blanche Georgiana Howard
19. Lady Georgiana Cavendish
2. Victor Cavendish, 9th Duke of Devonshire
20. Henry Lascelles, 2nd Earl of Harewood
10. Hon. William Lascelles
21. Henrietta Sebright
5. Emma Lascelles
22. George Howard, 6th Earl of Carlisle (=18)
11. Caroline Georgiana Howard
23. Lady Georgiana Cavendish (=19)
1. Lord Charles Cavendish
24. Henry Petty-Fitzmaurice, 3rd Marquess of Lansdowne
12. Henry Petty-Fitzmaurice, 4th Marquess of Lansdowne
25. Louisa Fox-Strangways
6. Henry Petty-Fitzmaurice, 5th Marquess of Lansdowne
26. Charles de Flahaut, comte de Flahaut de La Billarderie
13. Emily de Flahaut, 8th Lady Nairne
27. Margaret Mercer-Elphinstone, 7th Lady Nairne, 2nd Baroness Keith
3. Lady Evelyn Petty-Fitzmaurice
28. James Hamilton, Viscount Hamilton
14. James Hamilton, 1st Duke of Abercorn
29. Harriet Douglas
7. Lady Maud Hamilton
30. John Russell, 6th Duke of Bedford
15. Lady Louisa Russell
31. Hon. Georgiana Gordon
