= Lord Charles Cavendish =

Lord Charles Cavendish may refer to:

- Lord Charles Cavendish (politician, born 1704)
- Lord Charles Cavendish (1905–1944)
