= Mark Girouard =

British architectural historian (1931–2022)

Mark Girouard FSA
- Born: 7 October 1931; Marylebone, London, England
- Died: 16 August 2022 (aged 90); Paddington, London, England
- Occupation: Architectural historian
- Notable work: Elizabethan Architecture; Life in the English Country House; The Victorian Country House
- Spouse: Dorothy Girouard
- Parents: Richard Girouard (father); Lady Blanche Maud Beresford (mother)

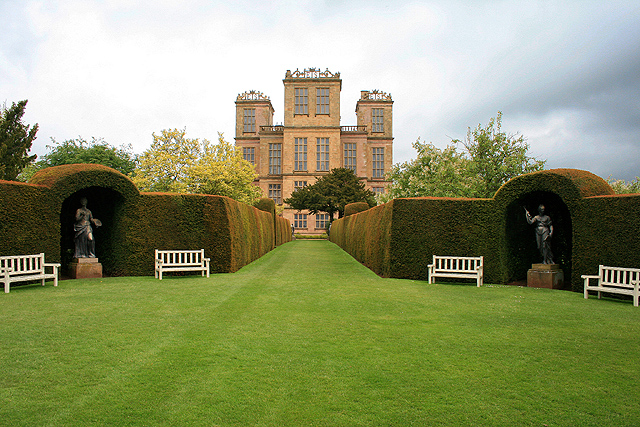
Hardwick Hall in Derbyshire – Girouard's pioneering study of its architect, Robert Smythson, established his reputation

Mark Girouard FSA (7 October 1931 – 16 August 2022) was a British architectural historian. He was an authority on the country house, and Elizabethan and Victorian architecture.

== Early life and career ==
Girouard was born in Marylebone, London on 7 October 1931. He was educated at Ampleforth College, read classics at Christ Church, Oxford, and then worked for the magazine Country Life from about 1958 until 1967, firstly as a writer on architecture and then, from 1964, as its architectural editor. He was Slade Professor of Fine Art from 1975 to 1976 and elected a Fellow of the Society of Antiquaries of London in 1987. Girouard was elected a Fellow of the Royal Society of Literature in 2011. He was on the board of trustees of The Architecture Foundation from 1992 to 1999 and a founder, and the first chairman, of the Spitalfields Historic Buildings Trust. He was the grandson of Henry Beresford, 6th Marquess of Waterford through his mother, Lady Blanche Girouard.

His Life in the English Country House won the Duff Cooper Memorial Prize for 1978, and the WH Smith Literary Award in 1979.

National Life Stories conducted an oral history interview (C467/92) with Girouard in 2009 for its Architects Lives' collection held by the British Library.

Photographs by Girouard are held in the Conway Library of Art and Architecture at the Courtauld Institute of Art in London, and are currently being digitised.

== Personal life and death ==
In 1970, Girouard married to the artist Dorothy Dorf (born 1942) and they lived in Notting Hill Gate, London. They had one daughter, the writer Blanche Girouard. The couple separated in the 1990s, but never divorced.

Girouard died from heart failure at St Mary's Hospital in Paddington, London, on 16 August 2022, aged 90.

He wrote of his ancestral connection to Saul Solomon, a pioneer liberal politician and businessman in Cape Colony, and his wife Georgiana Solomon, a social activist and suffragette. Girouard was descended from Saul's brother Edward, born in 1820 in Saint Helena, who spent 18 years working with the Griquas and Basutos in South Africa for the London Missionary Society.

== Bibliography ==
- Montacute House, Somerset (1964)
- Robert Smythson and the Architecture of the Elizabethan Era (1966)
- The Victorian Country House (1971; revised & enlarged 1979)
- Victorian Pubs (1975)
- Hardwick Hall (1976)
- Sweetness and Light: The "Queen Anne" Movement, 1860–1900 (1977)
- Life in the English Country House: A Social and Architectural History (1978)
- Historic Houses of Britain (1979)
- Alfred Waterhouse and the Natural History Museum (1981), ISBN 978-0-565-00831-4
- The Return to Camelot: Chivalry and the English Gentleman (1981)
- Robert Smythson and the Elizabethan Country House (1983)
- Cities and People: A Social and Architectural History (1985)
- A Country House Companion (1987) editor
- The English Town: A History of Urban Life (1990)
- Town and Country (1992)
- Windsor: The Most Romantic Castle (1993)
- Big Jim: The Life and Work of James Stirling (1998) Chatto & Windus, ISBN 978-0-7011-6247-4.
- A Hundred Years at Waddesdon (1998), ISBN 978-0-9527809-2-2.
- Life in the French Country House (2000)
- Rushton Triangular Lodge (2004)
- Elizabethan Architecture: Its Rise and Fall, 1540–1640 (2009), ISBN 978-0-300-09386-5.
- Enthusiasms (2011) Frances Lincoln, ISBN 978-071123329-4
- Friendships (2017) Wilmington Square Books, ISBN 978-190852496-6
- A Biographical Dictionary of English Architecture 1540–1640 (2021) London: Paul Mellon Centre. ISBN 978-1-913107-22-2.
