= Beatrix Beauclerk, Duchess of St Albans =

Her Grace The Duchess of St Albans
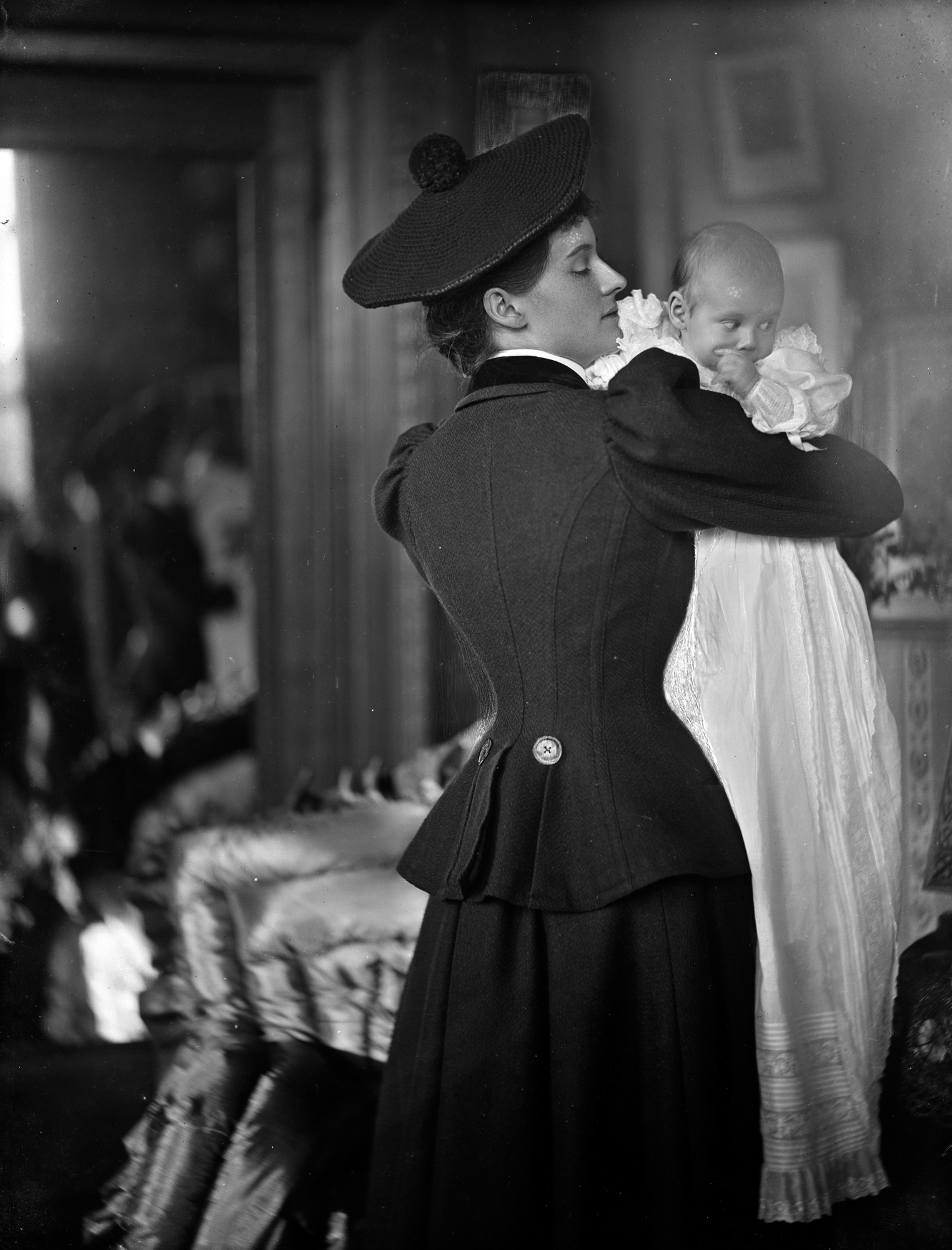
- Holding her eldest child, Lady Blanche Beresford
- Born: Lady Beatrix Frances Fitzmaurice; 25 March 1877
- Died: 5 August 1953 (aged 76)
- Other names: The Marchioness of Waterford; Lady Osborne Beauclerk
- Spouses: Henry Beresford, 6th Marquess of Waterford (m. 1897; died 1911) Osborne Beauclerk, 12th Duke of St Albans (m. 1918)
- Children: 6, including Blanche and John Charles
- Parent(s): Henry Petty-Fitzmaurice, 5th Marquess of Lansdowne; Lady Maud Hamilton
- Relatives: Hugh Dawnay (grandson); Sebastian Dawnay (great-grandson)

Beatrix Frances Beauclerk, Duchess of St Albans, GBE, DGStJ (25 March 1877 – 5 August 1953), born Lady Beatrix Frances Fitzmaurice and styled Marchioness of Waterford from 1897 to 1911, was a member of the Anglo-Irish aristocracy, both by birth and through her two marriages.

== Early life ==
Beatrix was a daughter of the 5th Marquess of Lansdowne and his wife Maud.

She was named after her maternal aunt, Beatrix Frances Lambton, Countess of Durham (born Lady Beatrix Frances Hamilton), Lady Lansdowne's favourite sister.

== Marriages and issue ==
On 16 October 1897, she married Henry Beresford, 6th Marquess of Waterford (and was styled as Marchioness of Waterford). Their wedding was a high society affair, noted in contemporary magazines.

The couple had six children:

- Lady Blanche Maud Beresford (1898–1940), who married Richard Girouard and had issue;
- Lady Katharine Nora (1899–1991), who married her first cousin, Sir David Dawnay, and had issue;
- John Charles de La Poer Beresford, 7th Marquess of Waterford (1901–1934), and had issue;
- Lady Beatrix Patricia (1902–1970), who married Lynden Miller and had issue;
- Lord William Beresford (1905–1973), who married Rachel Page and had issue;
- Lord Hugh Beresford (1908–1941), who died unmarried while on active service with the Royal Navy during the Second World War.

The Marquess died in 1911, and on 19 August 1918, Beatrix remarried, her second husband being Osborne Beauclerk, 12th Duke of St Albans, familiarly known as "Obby", and they set up home at the family's property at Newtown Anner House in Clonmel, County Tipperary. Through this marriage, she became Lady Osborne Beauclerk, but was better known as Beatrix Beauclerk. She became the Duchess of St Albans when her husband succeeded to the ducal title in 1934.

== Honours ==
She was appointed to the Orders of the British Empire (Knight Grand Cross (G.B.E.), 1919) and the Hospital of St. John of Jerusalem (Dame of Grace, D.G.St.J.) These honours were given in recognition of her work as a hospital administrator during the First World War.

== Death ==
She died of heart disease; her husband's reaction to her death was greater than friends of the couple had anticipated.

== Ancestry ==
Ancestors of Beatrix Beauclerk, Duchess of St Albans

8. Henry Petty-FitzMaurice, 3rd Marquess of Lansdowne
4. Henry Petty-Fitzmaurice, 4th Marquess of Lansdowne
9. Lady Louisa Fox-Strangways
2. Henry Petty-Fitzmaurice, 5th Marquess of Lansdowne
10. Charles, Comte de Flahaut
5. Emily de Flahaut
11. Margaret Mercer Elphinstone
1. Beatrix Beauclerk, Duchess of St Albans
12. James Hamilton, Viscount Hamilton
6. James Hamilton, 1st Duke of Abercorn
13. Harriet Douglas
3. Lady Maud Hamilton
14. John Russell, 6th Duke of Bedford
7. Lady Louisa Russell
15. Lady Georgina Gordon
