= VSM =

VSM may refer to:

== Organisations ==
- Varanger Sami Museum, a museum in Varangerbotn, Norway
- Veluwsche Stoomtrein Maatschappij, a Dutch heritage railway
- Vickers, Sons & Maxim, a British armaments and ammunition manufacturer of the early 20th century
- Villa Sainte-Marcelline, a private school in Westmount, Canada
- VSM Group or Viking Sewing Machines, a Swedish company
- Vysoká škola manažmentu or City University of Seattle in Slovakia, a private college

== Science and technology ==
- Variance shadow map, a process by which shadows are added to 3D computer graphics
- Vascular smooth muscle, a type of muscle found in blood vessels
- Vector space model, an algebraic model for representing objects as vectors of identifiers
- Vena saphena magna, a vein of the leg
- Viable system model, a model of an autonomous system capable of producing itself
- Vibrating-sample magnetometer, a scientific instrument

== Other uses ==
- Value-stream mapping, a product management method
- Vietnam Service Medal, a military award of the United States Armed Forces
- Vishisht Seva Medal, a military award of the Indian Armed Forces
- Voluntary Student Membership, a policy for New Zealand university student organisations
