= Evelyn Pass =

Mountain pass in the country of Canada

Coordinates: 52.70003°N 117.76903°W

Evelyn Pass is a mountain pass in Alberta, Canada.

Evelyn Pass has the name of Evelyn Cavendish, Duchess of Devonshire.
