= Lord Charles Fitzmaurice =

British soldier, and courtier (1874–1914)

Lord Charles Mercer Nairne MVO
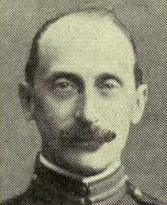
- Born: Charles George Francis Fitzmaurice; 12 February 1874
- Died: 30 October 1914 (aged 40)
- Spouse: Lady Violet Elliot-Murray-Kynymound (m. 1909)
- Children: Lady Mary Margaret Elizabeth Mercer Nairne; George Petty-Fitzmaurice, 8th Marquess of Lansdowne
- Parent(s): Lady Maud Evelyn Hamilton; Henry Petty-Fitzmaurice, 5th Marquess of Lansdowne
- Relatives: Henry Petty-Fitzmaurice, 4th Marquess of Lansdowne (grandfather); James Hamilton, 1st Duke of Abercorn (grandfather)

Lord Charles George Francis Fitzmaurice MVO (12 February 1874 – 30 October 1914) was an English soldier and courtier. For the last few months of his life he was known as Lord Charles Mercer Nairne.

== Early life ==
Fitzmaurice was the younger son of the former Lady Maud Evelyn Hamilton and Henry Charles Keith Petty-Fitzmaurice, 5th Marquess of Lansdowne, a British statesman who served successively as the fifth Governor General of Canada, Viceroy of India, Secretary of State for War, and Secretary of State for Foreign Affairs. His elder brother, Henry Petty-Fitzmaurice became the 6th Marquess and Charles inherited the Meikleour estate.

His paternal grandparents were Henry Petty-Fitzmaurice, 4th Marquess of Lansdowne, and his wife, Emily, 8th Lady Nairne (née Joseph). His maternal grandparents were James Hamilton, 1st Duke of Abercorn, and his wife Lady Louisa Jane Russell (a daughter of John Russell, 6th Duke of Bedford).

== Career ==
He joined the 1st King's Dragoon Guards in 1895, and served as an aide-de-camp to Frederick Roberts during the Boer War 1899–1900. He stayed as a lieutenant of the 1st Dragoon Guards until January 1901, when he was seconded for service on the army staff as Aide-de-camp to Lord Roberts, who had been appointed Commander-in-Chief of the Forces. Lord Roberts resigned when this post was abolished in early 1904, and Petty-Fitzmaurice was promoted to captain of his former regiment the 1st Dragoons in October 1904.

In May 1902, he was part of a delegation led by the Duke of Connaught to take part in the enthronement ceremonies in Madrid for the young King Alfonso XIII of Spain, and he was awarded the First class of the Spanish Order of Military Merit.

From 1909, he was an equerry to the Prince of Wales (later George V) until he was killed in action in World War I. On 1 January 1914 he adopted the surname of Mercer Nairne in place of Fitzmaurice.

== Personal life ==
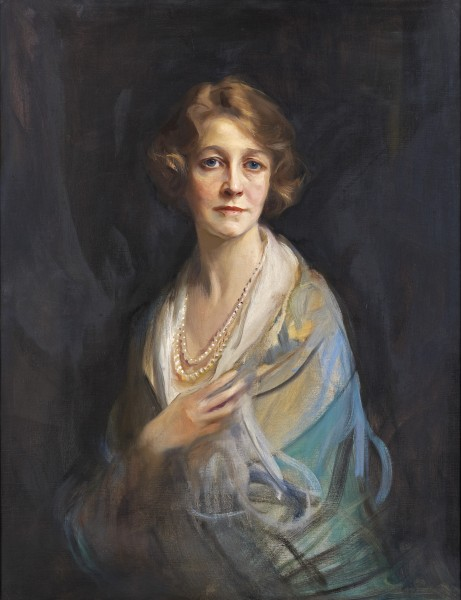
Portrait of his wife, Lady Violet Mary Elliot-Murray-Kynymound, by Philip de László, 1925

On 20 January 1909, he married Lady Violet Mary Elliot-Murray-Kynymound (daughter of Gilbert Elliot-Murray-Kynynmound, 4th Earl of Minto and Mary Caroline Grey) and they had two children:

- Lady Mary Margaret Elizabeth Mercer Nairne (1910–2003), who married Lt. Col. Ririd Myddleton. She was granted the rank of a marquess's daughter in 1946.
- George Petty-Fitzmaurice, 8th Marquess of Lansdowne (1912–1999)

Lord Charles was killed in action on 30 October 1914. He is buried in Ypres Town Cemetery. The inscription on his gravestone reads: NOT IN VAIN NOT UNHONOURED NOT FORGOTTEN THEY GAVE UP THEIR LIVES.

After his death, his widow Violet remarried to John Jacob Astor V (later 1st Baron Astor of Hever) on 28 August 1916.
