= Lord Patrick Beresford =

British soldier and equestrian (1934–2020)

- Born: 16 June 1934; London, England
- Died: 18 March 2020 (aged 85); Berkshire, England
- Education: Royal Military Academy Sandhurst
- Father: John Beresford
- Relatives: John Beresford (brother)
- Military career
- Service: British Army; Special Air Service
- Rank: Major
- Units: Royal Horse Guards; No 1 (Guards) Independent Parachute Company
- Commands: R Squadron 22 SAS
- Awards: General Service Medal

Major Lord Patrick Tristam de la Poer Beresford (16 June 1934 – 18 March 2020) was a British Army officer and equestrian.

== Biography ==
Born into Anglo-Irish aristocracy in London, his father was the 7th Marquess of Waterford and died, several months after Beresford was born, in a shooting accident. He was educated at Eton College and Sandhurst. He was commissioned into the Royal Horse Guards in 1952. In 1957, Beresford enjoyed a close relationship with Princess Margaret, so much so that the pair were rumoured to have been engaged.

Beresford served with his regiment in Germany, Cyprus, and Borneo, receiving a General Service Medal for the latter in which he had been transferred to the No 1 (Guards) Independent Parachute Company. In 1966, he joined the Special Air Service (SAS), commanding R Squadron 22 SAS in the Middle East. Ultimately gaining the rank of Major, he retired from the SAS in 1975. In Saudi Arabia, he was headhunted to be commander of the bodyguard of Sheikh Yamani.

Beresford was a senior member of the Guards Polo Club, serving as its first manager. He had earlier represented Windsor Park with Prince Philip, Duke of Edinburgh, and for many years was on his polo team. Winning the Queen's and Royal Windsor cups, he was appointed chef d'équipe of the British Eventing team in 1985, and led the team to success in European and World Championships throughout the late 1980s and early 1990s.

He died in March 2020 at his residence in Berkshire, England.
