= Lansdowne letter =

1917 letter calling for Britain to negotiate peace with Germany in World War I

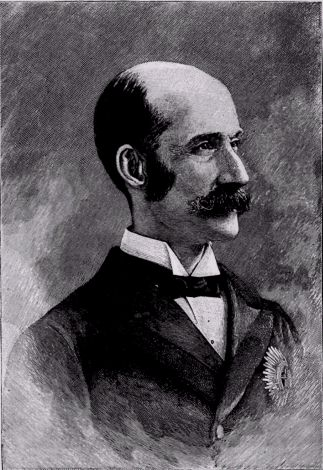
Henry Charles Keith Petty-Fitzmaurice, 5th Marquess of Lansdowne

The "Lansdowne letter" called for Britain to negotiate a peace with Germany during the First World War. It was published by a London newspaper and written by Henry Petty-Fitzmaurice, 5th Marquess of Lansdowne, a former foreign secretary and war minister. Lansdowne came under withering criticism, with few supporters, and the government rejected the proposal.

== Background ==
On 13 November 1916, Lansdowne circulated a paper to the Cabinet in which he argued that the war would destroy civilisation and that therefore peace should be negotiated on the basis of the status quo ante bellum. Lansdowne's proposal received a hostile response from other Unionists in the Cabinet such as Arthur Balfour and Lord Robert Cecil.

Lansdowne invited the editor of The Times, Geoffrey Dawson, to his house and showed him the letter he wanted to publish. Dawson was "appalled" and decided that publication would not be in the national interest. Lansdowne also showed the text to the Foreign Office, which did not veto it. He then offered the letter to The Daily Telegraph, which accepted it.

== Publication ==
On 29 November 1917, Lansdowne's letter was published in The Daily Telegraph. It called for a negotiated peace with Germany:

We are not going to lose this war, but its prolongation will spell ruin for the civilised world, and an infinite addition to the load of human suffering which already weighs upon it...We do not desire the annihilation of Germany as a great power ... We do not seek to impose upon her people any form of government other than that of their own choice... We have no desire to deny Germany her place among the great commercial communities of the world.

The letter also called for a guarantee of the 'freedom of the seas'.

== Reaction ==
Lansdowne became a pariah and his letter "a deed of shame". Bonar Law publicly criticised Lansdowne's letter, although U.S. President Woodrow Wilson was said to be "impressed" by the letter's arguments. H. G. Wells said Lansdowne's letter "was the letter of a Peer who fears revolution more than national dishonour".

Military leaders dismissed Lansdowne's proposals. Douglas Haig said that the prospects for 1918 were "excellent". Sir William Robertson, when asked whether the war could be won, replied:

Quite frankly, and at the same time quite respectfully, I can only say I am surprised that the question should be asked. The idea had not before entered my head that any member of His Majesty's Government had a doubt on the matter.

Most of the British press was critical of Lansdowne's proposals. The Times attacked it, as did The Morning Post and the Daily Mail. The Manchester Guardian and the Daily News welcomed the letter, as did the German press. In the United States, former American president Theodore Roosevelt, a vocal proponent of the war effort, denounced the letter: "Such a peace would leave the liberty loving nations of mankind at the ultimate mercy of the triumphant militarism and capitalism of the German autocracy."

The historian A. J. P. Taylor asserted that Fritz Fischer's work on German war aims revealed that the German government's minimum peace terms were incompatible with Lansdowne's proposals, and that the Germans would have "rudely rejected" them. The German equivalent of the Lansdowne letter was penned in 1916 by Karl Max, Prince Lichnowsky, the former ambassador in London, who was also criticised in Berlin for his well-intended efforts.

In February 1918, Lansdowne attempted to further advance bringing the war to a non-military conclusion by founding the Lansdowne Committee, and advocated his proposals on the floor of the House of Lords.
