= David Dawnay =

British Army general (1903–1971)

Major-General Sir David Dawnay KCVO CB DSO*
- Born: 10 July 1903; Whitfield Court, County Waterford, Ireland
- Died: 9 October 1971 (aged 68)
- Military career
- Allegiance: United Kingdom
- Branch: British Army
- Service years: 1924–1954
- Rank: Major-General
- Service number: 28293
- Units: Rifle Brigade (The Prince Consort's Own); 10th Royal Hussars; North Irish Horse
- Commands: 2nd Reconnaissance Regiment; North Irish Horse; 21st Army Tank Brigade; 26th Armoured Brigade; 86th Area; 2nd Armoured Brigade; 8th Armoured Brigade; Royal Military Academy Sandhurst; 56th (London) Armoured Division
- Conflicts: Second World War
- Awards: Knight Commander of the Royal Victorian Order; Companion of the Order of the Bath; Distinguished Service Order & Bar

Olympic medal record

Men's polo
Silver medal – second place	1936 Berlin	Team competition

Major-General Sir David Dawnay KCVO CB DSO* (10 July 1903 – 9 October 1971) was a British Army officer who became Commandant of the Royal Military Academy Sandhurst. He was also a British polo player who competed in the 1936 Summer Olympics.

== Military career ==
Born the son of Major the Hon. Hugh Dawnay, son of the 8th Viscount Downe and Lady Susan de la Poer Beresford, daughter of the 5th Marquess of Waterford and educated at Eton and the Royal Military College, Sandhurst, Dawnay was commissioned into the Rifle Brigade in January 1924 before transferring to the 10th Hussars later that year. He was part of the British polo team which won the silver medal in the 1936 Summer Olympics: he played both matches in the tournament, the first against Mexico and the final against Argentina.

Dawnay served in the Second World War as commanding officer of the 2nd Reconnaissance Regiment and then as commanding officer of the North Irish Horse in 1941. After serving as Second in Command of 23rd Armoured Brigade and then of 26th Armoured Brigade in 1943, he became commander of 21st Army Tank Brigade in 1944 and then commander of 26th Armoured Brigade in 1945.

After the war he became commander of 86th Area based at Venice in Italy and then commander of 2nd Armoured Brigade. He was made deputy commander of North Midland District in 1948, commander of 8th Armoured Brigade in November 1948 and commandant of the Royal Military Academy Sandhurst in January 1951. His last appointment was as 56th (London) Armoured Division in March 1954 before retiring in April 1957.

In retirement he was secretary to the Ascot Authority and clerk of the Course at Ascot.

== Family ==
In 1926 Dawnay married his cousin Lady Katharine Nora de la Poer Beresford, daughter of Henry de la Poer Beresford, 6th Marquess of Waterford and Lady Beatrix Frances Petty-FitzMaurice; they had two daughters and two sons. His son Major Hugh Dawnay was a well known polo player and respected coach whose son, Sebastian Dawnay, is also a professional polo player. Hugh's twin, Peter, married Caroline, daughter of Group Captain Nicolas Tindal-Carill-Worsley.

== Bibliography ==
- Doherty, Richard (2004). Ireland's Generals in the Second World War. Four Courts Press. ISBN 9781851828654.

Military offices
Preceded by Hugh Stockwell	Commandant of the Royal Military Academy Sandhurst; 1951–1954	Succeeded by Reginald Hobbs
Preceded by Richard Goodbody	GOC 56th (London) Armoured Division; 1954–1957	Succeeded by Robert Bray
