= All Together Now (festival) =

Annual music festival held in County Waterford, Ireland

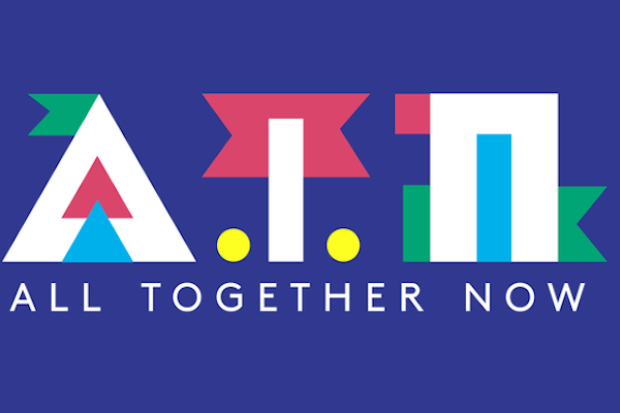
- Status: Active
- Genre: Music festival
- Frequency: Annually
- Locations: Curraghmore Estate, Portlaw, Waterford
- Coordinates: 52°17′27.25″N 7°22′8.12″W
- Country: Ireland
- Inaugurated: August 1, 2018
- Founder: John Reynolds
- Attendance: Approximately 35,000 in 2026
- Capacity: 35000
- Organiser: Pod Concerts; Aiken Promotions
- Website: www.alltogethernow.ie

All Together Now is an annual music festival held over the August Bank Holiday weekend at Curraghmore Estate in County Waterford, Ireland.

== History ==
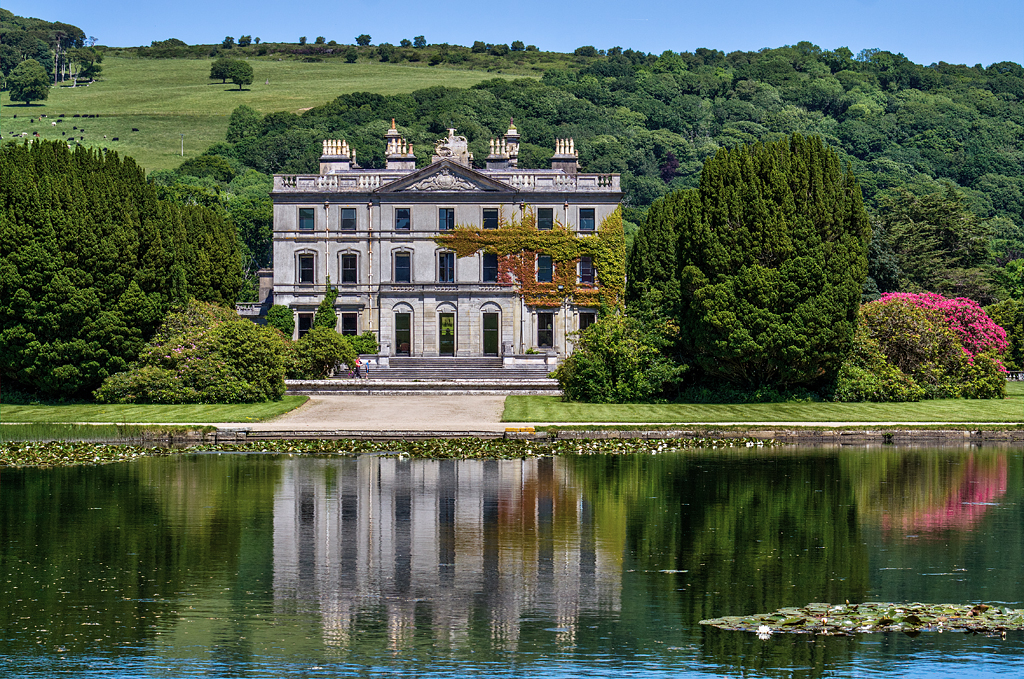
The festival is held on the grounds of Curraghmore house in County Waterford.

All Together Now debuted in August 2018 as a boutique festival held across four days and nights. It combines live music, art and food experiences on the landscaped Curraghmore demesne.

The 2019 iteration of the festival was criticised for its severe traffic problems, with many attendees stuck in multi-hour queues both arriving at and departing from the Curraghmore Estate site. The limited access routes, lack of adequate stewarding, and poor initial communication from organisers led to frustration. Additionally, there were issues raised around campsite conditions, sanitation, and the festival's environmental impact, all of which cast a shadow over what was otherwise praised for its musical lineup and atmosphere. After a two‑year pandemic hiatus caused by the COVID-19 pandemic, it returned in August 2022, showcasing a mixture of established names such as Nick Cave & The Bad Seeds, Underworld and Sinead O'Connor as well as rising Irish talent across 18 stages. In 2023, RTÉ partnered with the festival to curate the “Now by RTÉ” stage, featuring spoken‑word panels, live documentary broadcasts and performances by actors, musicians and the RTÉ Concert Orchestra.

In March 2025 Hot Press reported that All Together Now had sold out completely for their 2025 iteration.

== Programming and Line‑Ups ==
The festival’s line‑ups blend mainstream and alternative acts. Headliners have included the Prodigy, the National, Jorja Smith, James Vincent McMorrow in 2024. Supporting stages spotlight Irish acts such as The Murder Capital, Kojaque and King Kong Company alongside electronic, hip‑hop and folk performers. By early 2025, promoters announced fifty new additions, including Seun Kuti & Egypt 80, Lisa O’Neill and Arc De Soleil as well as DJ sets by Bonobo, Flight Facilities and Groove Armada.
