= Hugh Dawnay =

English polo player and author

- Born: 17 December 1932
- Died: 28 May 2012 (aged 79)
- Spouse(s): Maria Ines Cermesoni (m. 1971–2012; his death)
- Children: David and Sebastian

Major Hugh Dawnay (17 December 1932 – 28 May 2012) was a polo player and author.

== Biography ==
Hugh Dawnay was born on 17 December 1932 to the Olympic polo player David Dawnay and Lady Katharine Nora de la Poer Beresford. He was educated at Eton College. He was a major in the British Army 10th Royal Hussars, where he began his polo career, reaching a 3-goal handicap, eventually captaining both his regimental team and the British Army polo Team. After leaving the army he became a polo coach.

He ran his own polo school and club, the Whitfield Court International Polo Vision School in Waterford, Ireland between 1976 and 2002. Well known internationally, he visited 15 different countries on coaching trips. He conducted 10 annual polo clinics at the Palm Beach Polo and Country Club starting in 1983. He also served as the British Army polo coach.

He married Maria Ines Cermesoni in 1971, they had two sons David and Sebastian. He died on 28 May 2012.

== Bibliography ==
- Polo Vision (prefaced by Julian Hipwood and Tommy Wayman, 1992)
- Playmaker Polo (prefaced by Gonzalo Pieres, 2004)

== Filmography ==
- Polo Vision
