= Evelyn Cavendish, Duchess of Devonshire =

Member of the noble Cavendish family (1870–1960)

Her Grace The Duchess of Devonshire GCVO DStJ JP
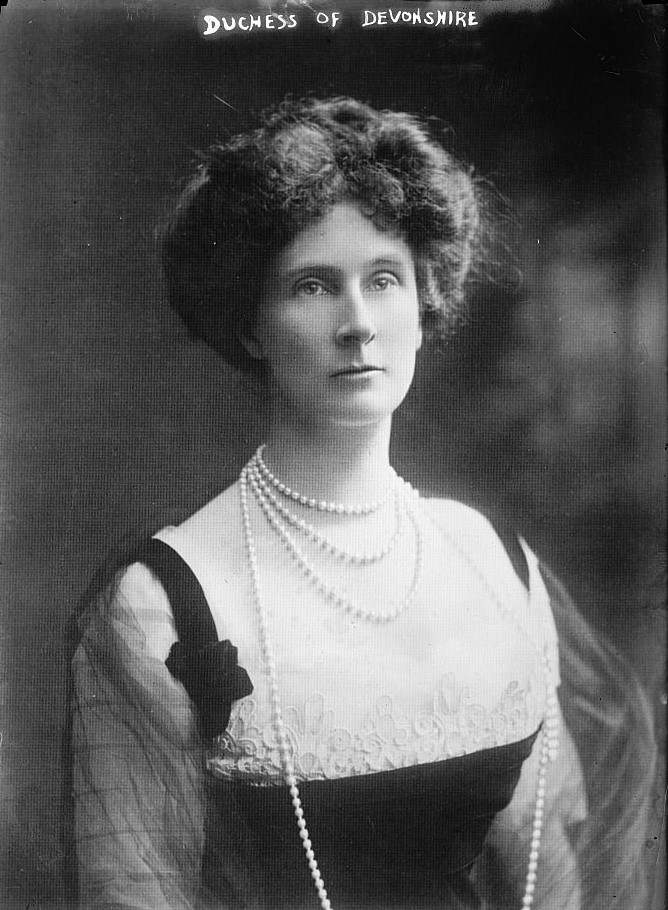
- Photograph of the Duchess of Devonshire from the Library of Congress

Mistress of the Robes
- In office 1910–1916
- Monarch: Queen Mary
- Preceded by: None
- Succeeded by: The Duchess of Sutherland
- In office 1921–1953
- Monarch: Queen Mary
- Preceded by: The Duchess of Sutherland
- Succeeded by: None

Personal details
- Born: Evelyn Emily Mary Fitzmaurice; 27 August 1870
- Died: 2 April 1960 (aged 89)
- Spouse: Victor Cavendish, 9th Duke of Devonshire (m. 1892; died 1938)
- Children: Edward Cavendish, 10th Duke of Devonshire; Lady Maud Cavendish; Lady Blanche Cavendish; Lady Dorothy Macmillan; Rachel Stuart, Viscountess Stuart of Findhorn; Lord Charles Cavendish; Lady Anne Hunloke
- Parents: Henry Petty-Fitzmaurice, 5th Marquess of Lansdowne; Lady Maud Hamilton

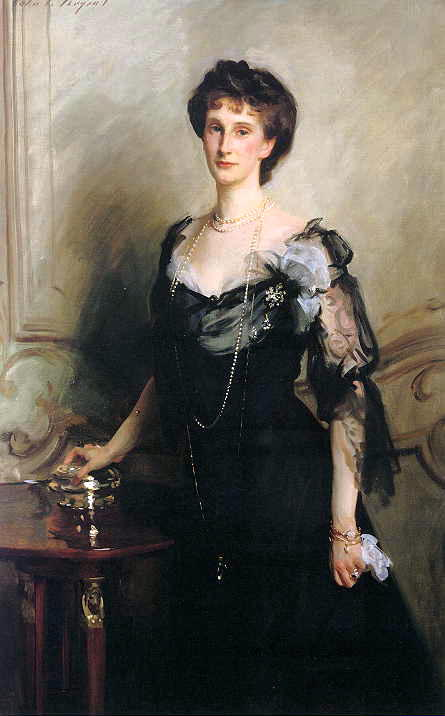
Portrait of Lady Evelyn Cavendish, John Singer Sargent (1902)

Evelyn Emily Mary Cavendish, Duchess of Devonshire, GCVO, DStJ, JP (née Fitzmaurice; 27 August 1870 – 2 April 1960), was the wife of Victor Cavendish, 9th Duke of Devonshire. She was the elder daughter of politician and diplomat Henry Petty-Fitzmaurice, 5th Marquess of Lansdowne, and grew up amidst public life. Evelyn's marriage to Cavendish, nephew and heir presumptive of Spencer Cavendish, 8th Duke of Devonshire, led to her becoming Duchess of Devonshire in 1908. With her position, she oversaw the reorganisation of the Devonshire estates and presided over four English houses and one Irish castle.

Evelyn held the position of Mistress of the Robes to Queen Mary from 1910 until 1916, when she accompanied her husband upon his appointment as Governor General of Canada. The Duchess held the position Viceregal Consort until the Duke's term ended in 1921. Upon returning to England, the Duchess again was appointed Mistress of the Robes to Queen Mary, holding the position until the latter's death in 1953. The Dowager Duchess, widowed since 1938, spent her final years living at Hardwick Hall, which was made over to HM Treasury in 1956, in part payment of death duties.

== Family and early life ==
Lady Evelyn was born on 27 August 1870, elder daughter of politician and statesman Henry Petty-Fitzmaurice, 5th Marquess of Lansdowne and his wife Lady Maud Hamilton, daughter of the 1st Duke of Abercorn. The Petty-Fitzmaurice dynasty were an Anglo-Irish aristocratic family, while the Hamilton dynasty were, by origin, an Ulster-Scots aristocratic family. Lord Lansdowne, Lady Evelyn's father, served as Governor General of Canada from 1883 to 1888, as Viceroy of India from 1888 to 1894, and as Leader of the Conservative Party in the House of Lords from 1903 to 1916. Lady Evelyn was consequently raised to public life.

== Marriage ==
Evelyn was married on 30 July 1892 to Victor Cavendish, the nephew and heir of the 8th Duke of Devonshire and the youngest member of the House of Commons. They and their growing family resided at Holker Hall in Lancashire, and would be sad to leave it to Lord Richard Cavendish upon Victor's accession as Duke of Devonshire in 1908. The family eventually came to include two sons, five daughters, and twenty-one grandchildren.

As part of the celebrations for Queen Victoria's Diamond Jubilee in 1897, Victor's uncle hosted the Devonshire House Ball, one of the event's most extravagant parties. Lady Evelyn attended in the dress of a Lady at the Court of the Empress Maria Theresa, while her husband dressed in sixteenth-century costume.

== Duchess of Devonshire ==
Victor succeeded his uncle as 9th Duke of Devonshire in 1908, whereupon Evelyn became the Duchess of Devonshire. The Devonshires were one of the country's richest families, thought by some to have more wealth than the royal family. The Duchess was to oversee four large estates in England and one Irish castle. With her new position, she oversaw the reorganisation of the Devonshire estates. The Duchess strictly adhered to etiquette and her position, being characterised by a brother-in-law as "accustomed to authority." She was known for her abrasive personality; her granddaughter-in-law wrote that she "was not altogether easy to get on with," whilst another referred to her as "an unpleasant woman." Her husband's biographer described her as "cold, authoritarian, and frugal," and a servant recalled that "she wouldn't speak to you unless she wanted something, and I can't say she ever thanked you either."

In 1909, the Duchess founded the Derbyshire branch of the Red Cross and became its first president. She was appointed Mistress of the Robes to the newly crowned Queen Mary in 1910. In 1916, the Duke accepted the appointment of Governor General of Canada, and his wife relinquished her position to accompany him, along with six of their children. While in Canada, their daughter Lady Dorothy met Harold Macmillan, the future prime minister. While the Duke was delighted with the match, the Duchess was unhappy that Macmillan, though wealthy, was the member of a mere tradesmen family. She favoured a match between her daughter and the heir to the Duke of Buccleuch instead. Nevertheless, Dorothy and Macmillan were married in April 1920.

The Duke of Devonshire's tenure in Canada ended in 1921, and the Duchess resumed her role as Mistress of the Robes to Queen Mary, holding the appointment from 1921 to the latter's death in 1953. Queen Mary invested the Duchess as a Dame Grand Cross of The Royal Victorian Order in May 1937.

== Widowhood ==
In April 1925, the Duke suffered a stroke that paralysed him and led to his gradual mental deterioration. Previously a jovial man, the duke became miserable towards his family and others, and suddenly could not tolerate his wife. Their granddaughter-in-law later recalled that "Granny Evie tried to carry on as if nothing had happened but the house and estate lacked a leader and it showed." The Duchess gained more authority over his estates, destroying its Decimus Burton-designed conservatory and saving expenses by introducing nettle soup to Chatsworth House, but their affairs "gradually went downhill." He died in May 1938; after his death, the Duchess took up residence at Hardwick Hall, where she oversaw a significant amount of repair work of its tapestries and embroideries.

In 1950, the unexpected death of the 10th Duke of Devonshire and the subsequent death duties (rated at 80%) caused the sale of many of the Devonshire assets and estates, including Hardwick. The decision was made to hand the house over to HM Treasury in lieu of Estate Duty in 1956. The Duchess agreed to the plan despite her love for the estate. In 1959, the Treasury transferred the house to the National Trust. The Duchess remained in occupation until her death on 2 April 1960. Having done much to conserve the textiles in the house, she was to be its last occupant.

== Issue ==
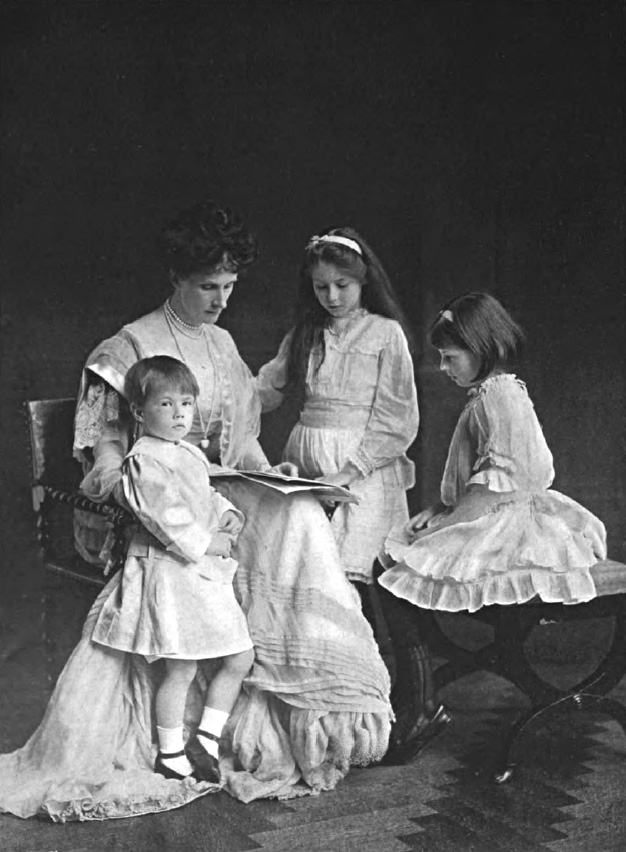
The Duchess of Devonshire, with three of her children

They had two sons and five daughters.

- Edward William Spencer Cavendish, 10th Duke of Devonshire (6 May 1895 – 26 November 1950); married Lady Mary Alice Gascoyne-Cecil, daughter of James Gascoyne-Cecil, 4th Marquess of Salisbury
- Lady Maud Louisa Emma Cavendish (20 April 1896 – 30 March 1975)
- Lady Blanche Katherine Cavendish (2 February 1898 – 1987)
- Lady Dorothy Evelyn Cavendish (28 July 1900 – 21 May 1966); married Harold Macmillan
- Lady Rachel Cavendish (22 January 1902 – 2 October 1977); married James Stuart, 1st Viscount Stuart of Findhorn
- Lord Charles Arthur Francis Cavendish (29 August 1905 – 23 March 1944); married Adele Astaire
- Lady Anne Cavendish (20 August 1909 – 1981); married, firstly, Henry Hunloke, then Christopher Holland-Martin and, lastly, Victor Montagu, 10th Earl of Sandwich

== Ancestry ==
Ancestors of Evelyn Cavendish, Duchess of Devonshire

8. Henry Petty-Fitzmaurice, 3rd Marquess of Lansdowne
4. Henry Petty-Fitzmaurice, 4th Marquess of Lansdowne
9. Lady Louisa Fox-Strangways
2. Henry Petty-FitzMaurice, 5th Marquess of Lansdowne
10. Charles Joseph, comte de Flahaut
5. Emily Jane de Flahaut, 8th Lady Nairne
11. Margaret Mercer Elphinstone, 7th Lady Nairne, 2nd Baroness Keith
1. Evelyn Cavendish, Duchess of Devonshire
12. James Hamilton, Viscount Hamilton
6. James Hamilton, 1st Duke of Abercorn
13. Harriet Hamilton Gordon, Countess of Aberdeen
3. Lady Maud Hamilton
14. John Russell, 6th Duke of Bedford
7. Lady Louisa Russell
15. Lady Georgiana Gordon

Court offices
Preceded by —	Mistress of the Robes to Queen Mary; 1910–1916	Succeeded by The Duchess of Sutherland
Preceded by The Duchess of Sutherland	Mistress of the Robes to Queen Mary; 1921–1953	Succeeded by —
Honorary titles
Preceded by The Duchess of Connaught	Viceregal consort of Canada; 1916–1921	Succeeded by The Viscountess Byng of Vimy
