= Henry Beresford, 6th Marquess of Waterford =

Irish peer

The Most Honourable The Marquess of Waterford KP KStJ DL
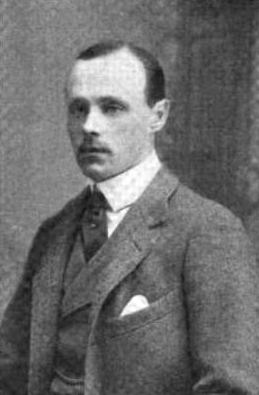
- Henry Beresford, Lord Waterford, in The Sketch, 27 February 1901
- Tenure: 1895–1911
- Born: 28 April 1875; London, England
- Died: 1 December 1911 (aged 36); Curraghmore, County Waterford, Ireland
- Noble family: Beresford
- Spouse: Lady Beatrix Petty-FitzMaurice (m. 1897)
- Issue: 6, including John Beresford, 7th Marquess of Waterford
- Parents: John Beresford, 5th Marquess of Waterford; Lady Blanche Somerset

Henry de la Poer Beresford, 6th Marquess of Waterford, KP, KStJ, DL (28 April 1875 – 1 December 1911), styled Earl of Tyrone until 1895, was an Irish peer and soldier.

== Biography ==
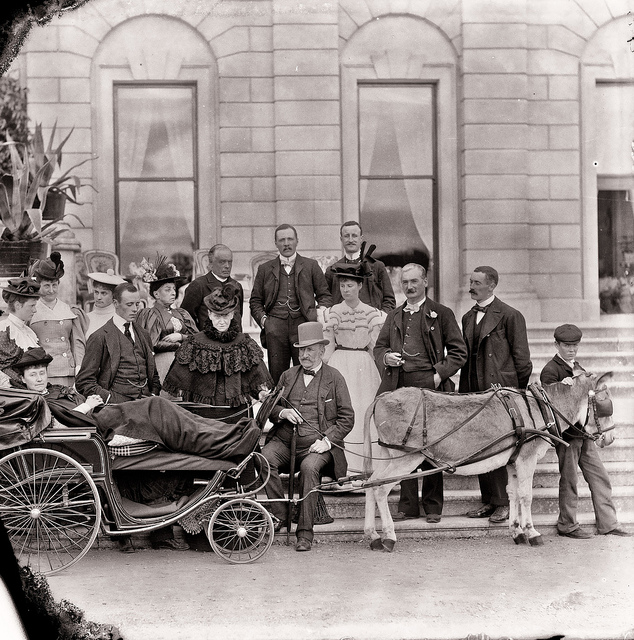
The Majority of the Marquess of Waterford, 1896, showing the invalid Dowager Marchioness of Waterford and the Duke and Duchess of Beaufort

Lord Tyrone was educated at Eton and became Marquess of Waterford in 1895 on the death of his father by suicide. When Lord Waterford reached his majority (i.e. turned 21 and came of age) on 28 April 1896 seven hundred invited guests, including the Duke of Beaufort attended the celebrations at the family seat of Curraghmore.

He held a commission in the 4th (Militia) battalion of the Worcestershire Regiment until 18 March 1896, when he transferred to a commission with the regular army as he became second lieutenant in the Royal Horse Guards.

He was appointed a deputy lieutenant of Northumberland on 21 May 1901, and invested as a Knight of the Order of St Patrick on 15 March 1902.

On 10 February 1902 he was appointed lieutenant-colonel in command of the South of Ireland Imperial Yeomanry. The following month he was seconded to the 37th Battalion of the Imperial Yeomanry, with the temporary rank of captain in the Army. The battalion had been raised to provide soldiers for the Second Boer War, and left in late May 1902 for South Africa, arriving in Cape Town the following month. Peace had been announced while they were at sea, however, and Lord Waterford soon returned home, resigning his commission in the Imperial Yeomanry on 25 August 1902.

While big game hunting in southern Africa Lord Tyrone was attacked by a lion. He narrowly escaped injury but in 1911 accidentally drowned in a river on his estate at Curraghmore. He had just overhauled his family's woollen mills at Kilmacthomas with new machinery, which following his death was sold off and later went to the Ardfinnan Woollen Mills.

== Family ==
On 16 October 1897, Lord Waterford married Lady Beatrix Frances Petty-Fitzmaurice, daughter of Henry Petty-Fitzmaurice, 5th Marquess of Lansdowne. They had six children:

- Lady Blanche Maud Beresford (1898–1940), who married Richard Girouard and had children
- Lady Katharine Nora Beresford (1899–1991), who married her cousin Sir David Dawnay and had children
- John Charles de La Poer Beresford, 7th Marquess of Waterford (1901–1934)
- Lady Beatrix Patricia Beresford (1902–1986), who married Lynden Miller and had children
- Lord William Beresford (1905–1973), who married Rachel Page and had children
- Lord Hugh Beresford (1908–1941), who died unmarried while serving in the Royal Navy. Lost with HMS Kelly south of Crete, 23 May 1941.

After Lord Waterford's death, Beatrix remarried and became Lady Osborne Beauclerk, but was better known as Beatrix Beauclerk. She became the Duchess of St. Albans when her husband, Lord Osborne Beauclerk, succeeded to the ducal title in 1934.

== Ancestry ==
Ancestors of Henry Beresford, 6th Marquess of Waterford

8. Henry Beresford, 2nd Marquess of Waterford
4. John Beresford, 4th Marquess of Waterford
9. Lady Susanna Carpenter
2. John Beresford, 5th Marquess of Waterford
10. Charles Leslie
5. Christiana Leslie
11. Anne Ryder
1. Henry Beresford, 6th Marquess of Waterford
12. Henry Somerset, 7th Duke of Beaufort
6. Henry Somerset, 8th Duke of Beaufort
13. Emily Smith
3. Lady Blanche Somerset
14. Richard Curzon-Howe, 1st Earl Howe
7. Lady Georgiana Curzon
15. Lady Harriet Brudenell

Peerage of Ireland
Preceded by John Beresford	Marquess of Waterford; 1895–1911	Succeeded by John Beresford
