= Sebastian Dawnay =

Irish polo player

- Born: Sebastian Hugo Dawnay; 3 October 1975 (age 51)
- Occupation: professional polo player
- Spouse: Louisa Dawnay
- Parents: Major Hugh Dawnay (father); Maria Ines Cermesoni (mother)

Sebastian Hugo Dawnay (born 3 October 1975) is a professional polo player who holds a 3-goal handicap outdoors and an 7-goal arena polo handicap. Sebastian has played for the England Arena Polo Team on several occasions as well as winning the Arena Gold Cup at The Royal County of Berkshire Polo Club. He has also played in some of the major outdoor polo competitions in the UK winning the British Open for the Gold Cup at Cowdray park with CS Brooks in 1996.

Sebastian is the son of the polo coach Major Hugh Dawnay and grandson of the British Olympic polo player David Dawnay.
