= Maud Petty-Fitzmaurice, Marchioness of Lansdowne =

British aristocrat and Vicereine of India

Her Excellency The Most Honourable The Marchioness of Lansdowne VA CI GBE CH GCStJ
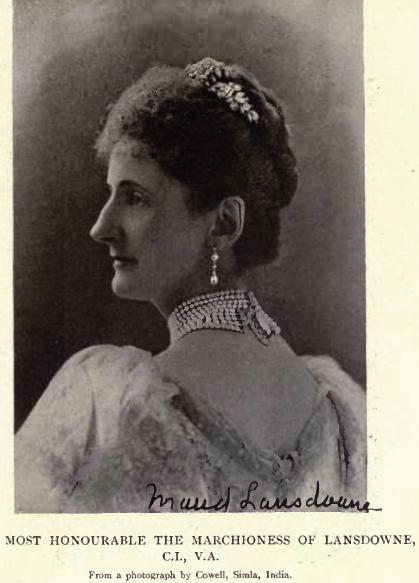

Lady of the Bedchamber to Queen Alexandra
- In office 1905–1910

Viceregal-Consort of India
- In office 10 December 1888 – 11 October 1894
- Monarch: Queen Victoria
- Preceded by: The Countess of Dufferin
- Succeeded by: The Countess of Elgin

Personal details
- Born: Lady Maud Evelyn Hamilton; 17 December 1850 St George Hanover Square, London, England
- Died: 21 October 1932 (aged 81) St George Hanover Square, London, England
- Spouse: Henry Petty-Fitzmaurice, 5th Marquess of Lansdowne (m. 1869; died 1927)
- Children: Evelyn Cavendish, Duchess of Devonshire; Henry Petty-Fitzmaurice, 6th Marquess of Lansdowne; Lord Charles Petty-Fitzmaurice; Beatrix Beauclerk, Duchess of St Albans
- Parents: James Hamilton, 1st Duke of Abercorn (father); Lady Louisa Russell (mother)

Maud Evelyn Petty-Fitzmaurice, Marchioness of Lansdowne, VA, CI, GBE, CH, GCStJ (née Hamilton; 17 December 1850 – 21 October 1932), was a British aristocrat and courtier. She was the wife of Henry Charles Keith Petty-FitzMaurice, 5th Marquess of Lansdowne, Governor General of Canada from 1883 to 1888. She was then Vicereine of India from 1888 to 1894 while her husband was Viceroy.

== Marriage ==
Lady Lansdowne was a daughter of James Hamilton, 1st Duke of Abercorn, and Lady Louisa Jane Russell. On 8 November 1869, she married Henry Petty-Fitzmaurice, 5th Marquess of Lansdowne, at Westminster Abbey and they had four children:

- Lady Evelyn Emily Mary Fitzmaurice (27 August 1870 – 2 April 1960)
- Henry William Edmund Petty-Fitzmaurice, Earl of Kerry (14 January 1872 – 5 March 1936)
- Lord Charles George Francis Fitzmaurice (12 February 1874 – 30 October 1914)
- Lady Beatrix Frances Fitzmaurice (25 March 1877 – 5 August 1953)

== Later years ==
From 1905 to 1909 she was a Lady of the Bedchamber to Queen Alexandra; she was Extra Lady from 1910 to 1925. During the First World War she set up the Officers' Families Fund and served as its president, and she and her husband lent their house, Lansdowne House in Berkeley Square, London, to serve as its headquarters. She had previously done the same in the Second Boer War. She also set up an auxiliary Red Cross hospital in the Orangery at Bowood House on their Wiltshire estate.

For this and other charitable services, she was appointed Dame Grand Cross of the Order of the British Empire (GBE) in the 1920 civilian war honours.

== Death ==
She died in 1932, aged 81, and was buried (as her husband had been, five years earlier) at Derry Hill church, at the gates of their Bowood estate.

== Ancestry ==
Ancestors of Maud Petty-Fitzmaurice, Marchioness of Lansdowne

16. Captain The Hon. John Hamilton
8. John Hamilton, 1st Marquess of Abercorn
17. Harriet Craggs
4. James Hamilton, Viscount Hamilton
18. Sir Joseph Copley, 1st Baronet
9. Catherine Copley
19. Mary Buller
2. James Hamilton, 1st Duke of Abercorn
20. James Douglas, 14th Earl of Morton
10. The Hon. John Douglas
21. Bridget Heathcote
5. Harriet Douglas
22. Edward Lascelles, 1st Earl of Harewood
11. Lady Frances Lascelles
23. Anne Chaloner
1. Maud Petty-Fitzmaurice, Marchioness of Lansdowne
24. John Russell, 4th Duke of Bedford
12. Francis Russell, Marquess of Tavistock
25. The Hon. Gertrude Leveson-Gower
6. John Russell, 6th Duke of Bedford
26. Willem van Keppel, 2nd Earl of Albemarle
13. Lady Elizabeth Keppel
27. Lady Anne Lennox
3. Lady Louisa Jane Russell
28. Cosmo Gordon, 3rd Duke of Gordon
14. Alexander Gordon, 4th Duke of Gordon
29. Lady Catherine Gordon
7. Lady Georgina Gordon
30. Sir William Maxwell, 3rd Baronet of Monreith, Wigtownshire
15. Jane Maxwell
31. Magdalen Blair

Honorary titles
Preceded by Princess Louise	Viceregal consort of Canada; 1883–1888	Succeeded by The Countess of Derby
