= Henry Petty-Fitzmaurice, 5th Marquess of Lansdowne =

British politician and colonial administrator (1845–1927)

The Most Honourable The Marquess of Lansdowne KG GCSI GCMG GCIE PC
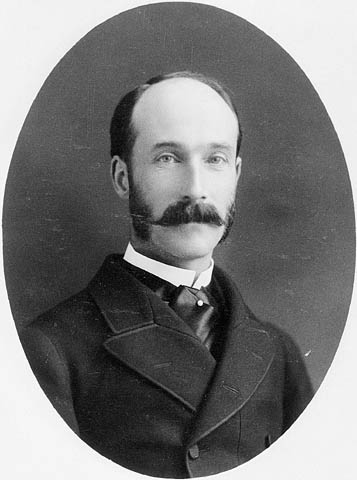
- Lansdowne in 1883

Viceroy and Governor-General of India
- In office 10 December 1888 – 11 October 1894
- Monarch: Victoria
- Prime Minister: William Ewart Gladstone; The Marquess of Salisbury
- Preceded by: The Earl of Dufferin
- Succeeded by: The Earl of Elgin

5th Governor General of Canada
- In office 23 October 1883 – 11 June 1888
- Monarch: Victoria
- Prime Minister: Canadian: John A. Macdonald; British: William Ewart Gladstone; The Marquess of Salisbury
- Preceded by: The Marquess of Lorne
- Succeeded by: The Lord Stanley of Preston

Minister without Portfolio
- In office 25 May 1915 – 10 December 1916
- Monarch: George V
- Prime Minister: H. H. Asquith
- Preceded by: Michael Hicks Beach
- Succeeded by: Arthur Henderson

Leader of the House of Lords
- In office 13 October 1903 – 4 December 1905
- Monarch: Edward VII
- Prime Minister: Arthur Balfour
- Preceded by: The Duke of Devonshire
- Succeeded by: The Marquess of Ripon

Secretary of State for Foreign Affairs
- In office 12 November 1900 – 4 December 1905
- Monarchs: Victoria; Edward VII
- Prime Minister: The Marquess of Salisbury; Arthur Balfour
- Preceded by: The Marquess of Salisbury
- Succeeded by: Sir Edward Grey

Secretary of State for War
- In office 4 July 1895 – 12 November 1900
- Monarch: Victoria
- Prime Minister: The Marquess of Salisbury
- Preceded by: Henry Campbell-Bannerman
- Succeeded by: St John Brodrick

Parliamentary Under-Secretary of State for India
- In office 29 April 1880 – 1 September 1880
- Monarch: Victoria
- Prime Minister: William Ewart Gladstone
- Preceded by: Hon. Edward Stanhope
- Succeeded by: The Viscount Enfield

Parliamentary Under-Secretary of State for War
- In office 25 April 1872 – 17 February 1874
- Monarch: Victoria
- Prime Minister: William Ewart Gladstone
- Preceded by: The Lord Northbrook
- Succeeded by: The Earl of Pembroke

Lord Commissioner of the Treasury
- In office 16 December 1868 – 25 April 1872
- Monarch: Victoria
- Prime Minister: William Ewart Gladstone
- Preceded by: Lord Claud Hamilton
- Succeeded by: Lord Frederick Cavendish

Member of the House of Lords Lord Temporal
- In office 5 July 1866 – 3 June 1927; Hereditary Peerage
- Preceded by: The 4th Marquess of Lansdowne
- Succeeded by: The 6th Marquess of Lansdowne

Personal details
- Born: Henry Charles Keith Petty-Fitzmaurice; 14 January 1845 London, England
- Died: 3 June 1927 (aged 82) Clonmel, County Tipperary, Ireland
- Party: Liberal (until 1886); Liberal Unionist (1886-1912); Conservative (1912-1927)
- Spouse: Lady Maud Hamilton (m. 1869)
- Children: Evelyn Cavendish, Duchess of Devonshire; Henry Petty-Fitzmaurice, 6th Marquess of Lansdowne; Lord Charles Petty-Fitzmaurice; Beatrix Beauclerk, Duchess of St Albans
- Parents: Henry Petty-Fitzmaurice, 4th Marquess of Lansdowne (father); Emily, 8th Lady Nairne (mother)
- Education: Balliol College, Oxford

Henry Charles Keith Petty-Fitzmaurice, 5th Marquess of Lansdowne KG GCSI GCMG GCIE PC (14 January 1845 – 3 June 1927), was a British statesman who served successively as Governor General of Canada, Viceroy of India, Secretary of State for War and Secretary of State for Foreign Affairs.

In 1917, during the First World War, he wrote the "Lansdowne letter", advocating in vain a compromise peace. A millionaire, he had the distinction of having held senior positions in Liberal and Conservative Party governments.

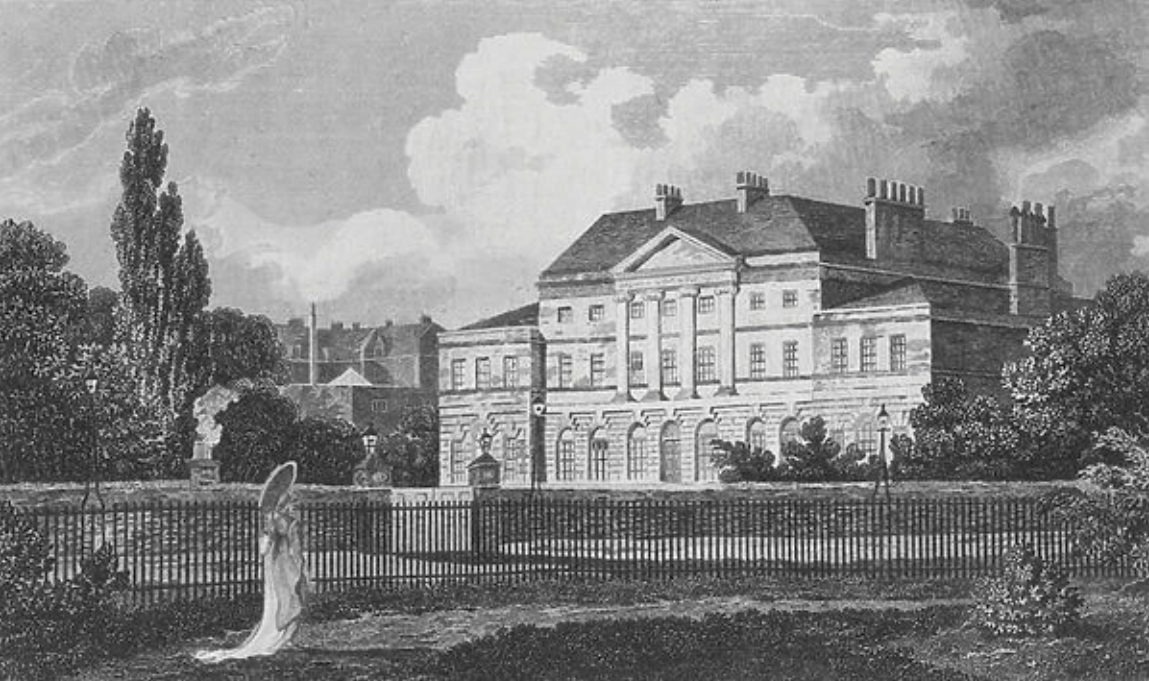
Lansdowne House, England, London seat of the Marquess of Lansdowne

== Early years, 1845–1882 ==
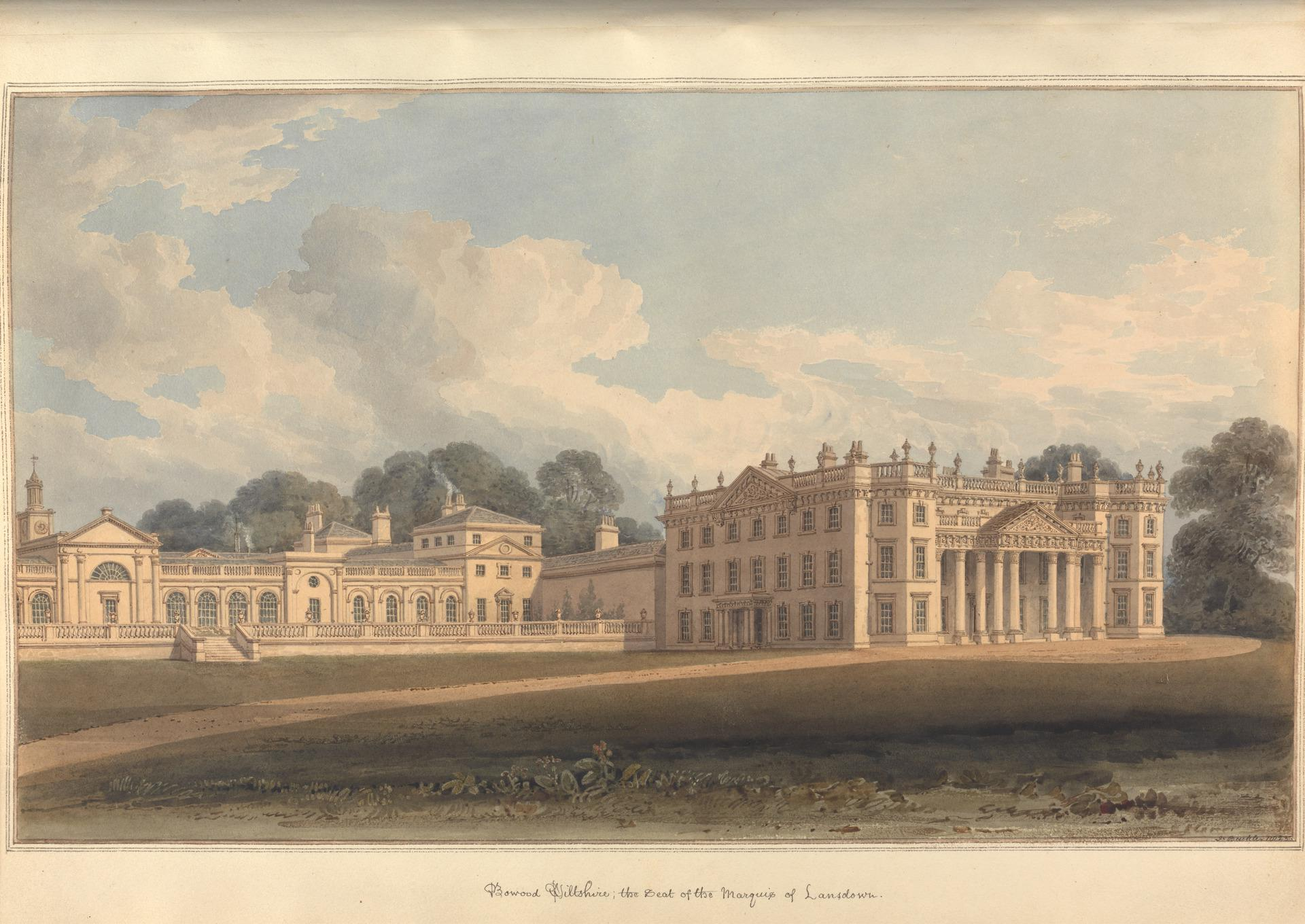
Bowood House, estate inherited by Lansdowne

A great-grandson of British Prime Minister Lord Shelburne (later 1st Marquess of Lansdowne) and the eldest son of Henry Petty-Fitzmaurice, 4th Marquess of Lansdowne, and his wife, Emily, 8th Lady Nairne (née de Flahaut), Henry Charles Keith Petty-Fitzmaurice was born in 1845 at Lansdowne House, their family seat in London. His maternal grandfather, Count Charles de Flahaut, was an important French general to Napoleon Bonaparte, and a member of his family. He fought along his side during many battles and later occupied the functions of Ambassador and Senator of the Empire. Through his mother Emily, Lansdowne was half-nephew of Emperor Napoleon III, a step-grandson of Queen Hortense Bonaparte, and a great-grandson of Prince Talleyrand, the Emperor's foreign minister. His maternal great-grandfather, George Elphinstone, 1st Viscount Keith, was also the Admiral who prevented Napoleon's escape from France after the Battle of Waterloo, and who received and supervised his final exile to St. Helena in 1815.

Lord Lansdowne was a member of the Fitzmaurice/Petty-Fitzmaurice family, a cadet branch of the House of FitzGerald of Ireland. He held the courtesy title Viscount Clanmaurice from birth to 1863 and then the courtesy title Earl of Kerry until he succeeded as Marquess of Lansdowne in 1866. Upon his mother's death in 1895, he succeeded her as the 9th Lord Nairne in the Peerage of Scotland. He was estimated to be the sixteenth richest peer in the United Kingdom, and the fourth largest landowner.

After studying at Eton and Oxford, he succeeded his father as 5th Marquess of Lansdowne (in the Peerage of the United Kingdom) and 6th Earl of Kerry (in the Peerage of Ireland) at the relatively early age of 21 on 5 June 1866. He inherited a vast estate (including Bowood House, a Wiltshire estate of over 142,000 acres) and great wealth. At one of his inherited properties, Derreen House (Lauragh, County Kerry, in the present-day Republic of Ireland), Lord Lansdowne started to develop a great garden from 1871 onwards. For most of the rest of his life, he spent three months of the year at Derreen.

Lord Lansdowne entered the House of Lords as a member of the Liberal Party in 1866. He served in William Ewart Gladstone's government as a Lord of the Treasury from 1869 to 1872 and as Under-Secretary of State for War from 1872 to 1874. He was appointed Under-Secretary of State for India in 1880 and, having gained experience in overseas administration, was appointed Governor General of Canada in 1883, replacing John Campbell, 9th Duke of Argyll, the son-in-law of Queen Victoria.

He was a member and trustee of Brooks's Club in London, along notable members such as Spencer Cavendish, 8th Duke of Devonshire of Chatsworth House, Lord Rosebery of Mentmore Towers, and Baron Lionel de Rothschild of Tring Park, son of Nathan Mayer of Gunnersbury Park, and grandson of Mayer Amschel, founder of the House of Rothschild. His great-grandfather, Lord Shelburne, had previously founded Boodle's Club, which had as members Adam Smith, the Duke of Wellington, Sir Winston Churchill, and Ian Fleming, among others, and is now the second oldest club in the world.

In 1897, he also became a founding trustee of the National Gallery of British Art, with the Earl of Carlisle of Castle Howard, Lord Brownlow of Belton House, Alfred de Rothschild of Halton House, Sir Charles Tennant of Glen House, John Postle Heseltine of Walhampton House, and Sir John Murray Scott.

== Governor General of Canada, 1883–1888 ==
Lord Lansdowne was Governor General during turbulent times in Canada. His Protestant Irish connections made him unpopular with the Catholic Irish element. He was appointed GCMG in January 1884.

Prime Minister Sir John A. Macdonald's government was in its second term and facing allegations of scandal over the building of the railway (the Pacific Scandal), and the economy was once again sliding into recession. The North-West Rebellion of 1885 and the controversy caused by its leader, Louis Riel, posed a serious threat to the equilibrium of Canadian politics. To calm the situation, he travelled extensively throughout Western Canada in 1885 and met many of Canada's First Nations peoples. He publicly objected to the treatment of the Indigenous by Indian Agents, and supported Chiefs Crowfoot and Poundmaker. His experiences in Western Canada gave Lansdowne a great love of the Canadian outdoors and the physical beauty of Canada. He was an avid fisherman and was intensely interested in winter sports. His love of the wilderness and the Canadian countryside led him to purchase a second residence (first Cascapedia House, built in 1880, later renamed Lorne Cottage, and then New Dereen Camp, built in 1884) on the Cascapédia River in the Gaspé Peninsula, Quebec. The same area was previously used by the past Viceroy of Canada, John Campbell, 9th Duke of Argyll, and his wife, Princess Louise, the daughter of Queen Victoria.

Lansdowne proved to be an adept statesman in helping to settle a dispute over fishing rights between Canada and the United States in 1886–1887. He successfully negotiated a new trade agreement with U.S. President Grover Cleveland (though it later failed to pass in the Senate). He was also a supporter of scientific development and presided over the inaugural session of the British Association for the Advancement of Science in 1884. In Quebec, he was very popular, as he spoke French fluently, which gained him the admiration of French-Canadians, and a big round of applause during his first speech. His French came from his maternal grandfather, Count Charles de Flahaut, who had been a French general to Napoleon Bonaparte. Lord Lansdowne also made multiple speeches at the Citadelle of Quebec, near Château Frontenac, and joined the Montreal Winter Carnival, making him and his wife, the first vice-royal couple to skate at that event.

Lansdowne departed Canada "with its clear skies, its exhilarating sports, and within the bright fire of Gatineau logs, with our children and friends gathered round us" to his regret. He gave his wife a great deal of the credit for his success in Canada. One of her happiest and most successful endeavours at Rideau Hall was a party that she threw for 400 Sunday school children. Lady Lansdowne was decorated with the Order of Victoria and Albert and the Imperial Order of the Crown of India. Lord Lansdowne's military secretary, Lord Melgund, later became Lord Minto and served as Governor General between 1898 and 1904. Parc Lansdowne and Lansdowne Avenue in Westmount, Montreal, next to Westmount Park, was named in his honor, as well as Lansdowne Ridge and Upper-Lansdowne, both located on Westmount's summit next to Villa Sainte-Marcelline and Saint Joseph's Oratory.

== Viceroy of India, 1888–1894 ==
Lord Lansdowne was appointed Viceroy of India the same year that he left Canada. In December 1888 he was appointed GCSI and GCIE His policies exacerbated tensions between Hindu and Muslims. The present day town of Lansdowne in Uttarakand state was established in 1887 and named after him.

== Secretary of State for War, 1895–1900 ==
Upon his return, as a Liberal Unionist, he aligned with the Conservative Party. Prime Minister Lord Salisbury appointed Lansdowne to the post of Secretary of State for War in June 1895. The unpreparedness of the British Army during the Second Boer War brought calls for Lansdowne's impeachment in 1899. His biographer, P. B. Waite, considers that he was unjustly criticised for British military failures, but ever the good minister, he took full responsibility and said nothing. Simon Kerry has argued that due to the lack of Parliamentary interest and political rivalries the War Office and Army were unreformable.

== Secretary of State for Foreign Affairs, 1900–1905 ==
After the Unionist victory in the general election of October 1900, Salisbury reorganised his cabinet, gave up the post of Foreign Secretary and appointed Lansdowne to replace him. Lansdowne remained at the Foreign Office under Salisbury's successor Arthur Balfour. As British Foreign Secretary, he approved of protectorate Commissioner Wilson's 1901 Anglo-Ankole agreement in Uganda, he also signed the 1902 Anglo-Japanese Alliance at his London home, the back half of which still exists as the Lansdowne Club, and negotiated the 1904 Anglo-French Entente Cordiale with French Foreign Minister Theophile Delcassé.

According to G. W. Monger's summary of the Cabinet debates in 1900 to 1902:

Chamberlain advocated ending Britain's isolation by concluding an alliance with Germany; Salisbury resisted change. With the new crisis in China caused by the Boxer rising and Landsdowne's appointment to the Foreign Office in 1900, those who advocated a change won the upper hand. Landsdowne in turn attempted to reach an agreement with Germany and a settlement with Russia but failed. In the end Britain concluded an alliance with Japan. The decision of 1901 was momentous; British policy had been guided by events, but Lansdowne had no real understanding of these events. The change of policy had been forced on him and was a confession of Britain's weakness.

=== Big Revolver ===
On 15 June 1903, he made a speech in the House of Lords defending fiscal retaliation against countries with high tariffs and governments subsidising products for sale in Britain (known as 'bounty-fed products', also called dumping). Retaliation was to be done by threatening to impose tariffs in response against that country's goods. His Liberal Unionists had split from the Liberals, who promoted Free Trade, and the speech was a landmark in the group's slide towards protectionism. Landsdowne argued that threatening retaliatory tariffs was similar to getting respect in a room of armed men by showing a big revolver (his exact words were "a rather larger revolver than everybody else's"). The "Big Revolver" became a catchphrase of the day and was often used in speeches and cartoons.

== Unionist leader in Lords ==
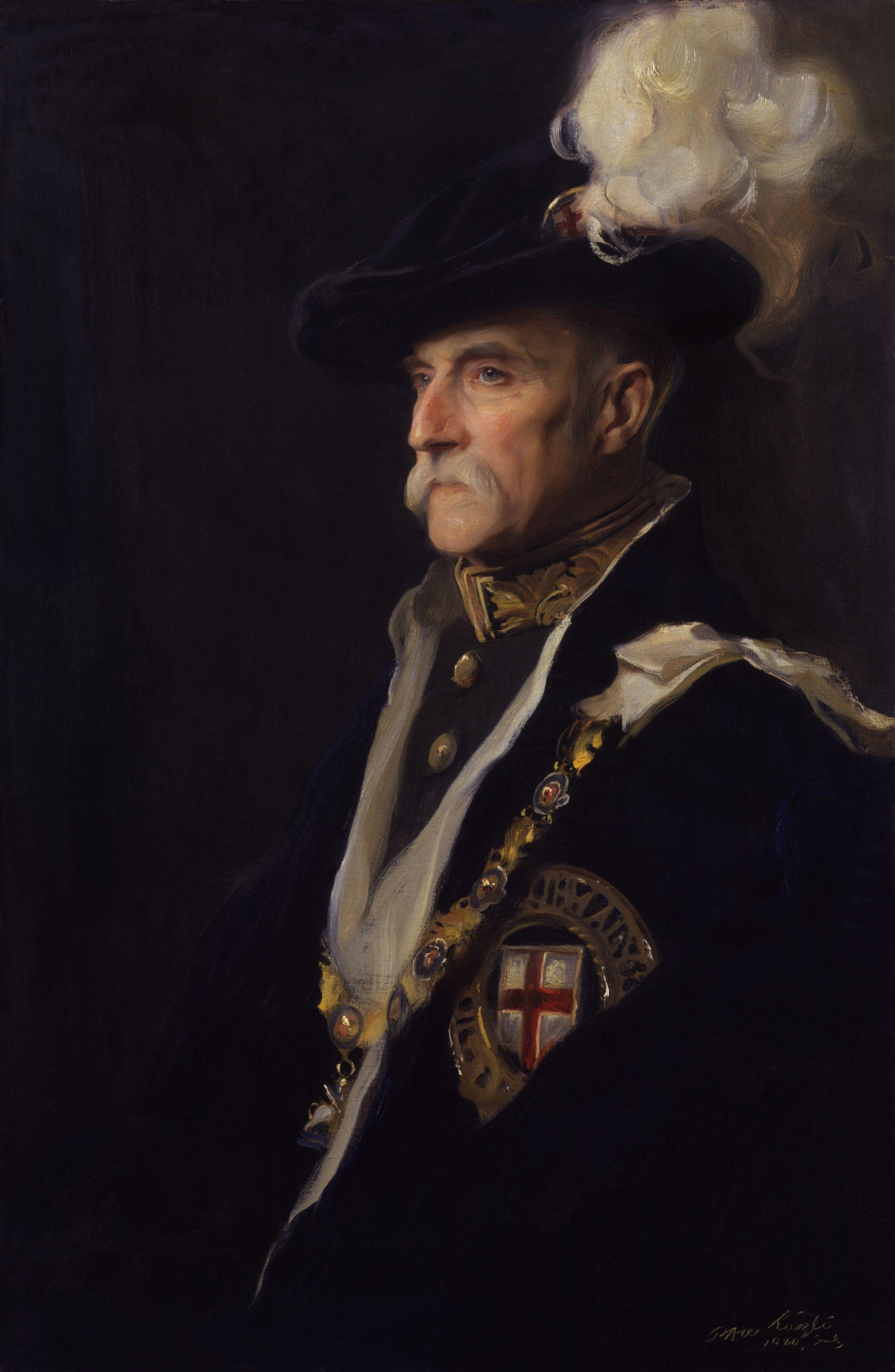
The Marquess of Lansdowne by Philip Alexius de László, 1920

In 1903, Lord Lansdowne became the leader of Unionists (Conservative and Liberal Unionist peers) in the House of Lords. This was followed shortly by the Liberal victory in the January 1906 general elections. In his new role as head of the opposition peers, he was instrumental in the Unionist leader Arthur Balfour's plans to obstruct Liberal policies through the Unionist majority in the upper house. Although he and Balfour had some misgivings, he led the Lords to reject the People's Budget of 1909. After the Liberals won two elections in 1910 on the pledge to reform the House of Lords and to remove its veto power and after a series of failed negotiations in which Lansdowne was of key importance, the Liberals moved forward to end the Lords veto, if necessary by recommending to the King to create hundreds of new Liberal peers. Lansdowne and the other Conservative leaders were anxious to prevent such an action by allowing the bill, distasteful as they found it, to pass, but soon, Lansdowne found that he could not count on many of the more reactionary peers, who planned on a last-ditch resistance. Ultimately, enough Unionist peers either (like Lansdowne himself) abstained from the vote ("hedgers") or even voted for the bill ("rats") to ensure its passage into the Parliament Act 1911.

In the following years, Lansdowne continued as Opposition Leader in the Lords, his stature increasing when Balfour, the party leader in the Commons, resigned and was replaced by the inexperienced Bonar Law, who had never held cabinet office. In 1914, the suffragettes Flora Drummond and Norah Dacre Fox (later known as Norah Elam) besieged Lansdowne's home and argued that Ulster's incitement to militancy had passed without notice, but suffragettes were charged and imprisoned. In 1915, Lansdowne joined the wartime coalition cabinet of H. H. Asquith as a Minister without Portfolio but was not given a post in the Lloyd George government formed the following year, despite Conservative pre-eminence in that government. In 1917, having discussed the idea with colleagues for some time with no response, he published the controversial "Lansdowne letter", which called for a statement of postwar intentions from the Entente Powers, and an end to the war on the basis of a return to the status quo ante. He was criticised as acting contrary to cabinet policy.

== Death ==
Lord Lansdowne died at Clonmel, Ireland on 3 June 1927 at the age of 82. The probate on his estate was granted with the value sworn at £1,044,613 (equivalent to about £56,700,000 in 2025) in land and another £233,888 in other assets. His widow died in 1932, and their tombs are in the churchyard at Derry Hill, near their Bowood estate in Wiltshire.

== Family ==
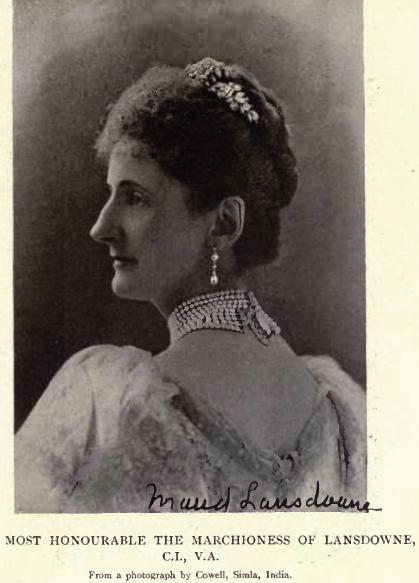
Lady Maud Evelyn Hamilton, Marchioness of Lansdowne by Cowell, Simla, India

Henry Petty-FitzMaurice married Lady Maud Evelyn Hamilton, a daughter of James Hamilton, 1st Duke of Abercorn and his wife Lady Lady Louisa Jane Russell, daughter of John Russell, 6th Duke of Bedford in 1869. The couple had four children:

- Lady Evelyn Emily Mary Petty-Fitzmaurice (27 August 1870 – 2 April 1960), married Victor Cavendish, 9th Duke of Devonshire.
- Henry William Edmund Petty-Fitzmaurice, 6th Marquess of Lansdowne (14 January 1872 – 5 March 1936), was cousin of Charles Spencer-Churchill, 9th Duke of Marlborough, cousin of Winston Churchill and husband of Consuelo Vanderbilt.
- Lord Charles George Francis Petty-Fitzmaurice (12 February 1874 – 30 October 1914), his widow, Baroness Violet Astor, remarried to John Jacob Astor V.
- Lady Beatrix Frances Petty-Fitzmaurice (25 March 1877 – 5 August 1953), married firstly Henry Beresford, 6th Marquess of Waterford and secondly Osborne Beauclerk, 12th Duke of St Albans.

== Arms ==
Coat of arms of Henry Petty-Fitzmaurice, 5th Marquess of Lansdowne
| Coronet A Coronet of a Marquess Crest 1st, a beehive beset with bees, diversely volant, proper; 2nd, a centaur drawing a bow and arrow, proper, the part from the waist argent. Escutcheon Quarterly : 1st and 4th Ermine, on a bend, azure a magnetic needle pointing at a polar star, or, (Petty); 2nd and 3rd Argent, a saltier, gules, a chief, ermine (Fitzmaurice). Supporters Two pegasi, ermine.; bridled, crined, winged, and unguled, or, each charged on the shoulder with a fienr-de-lis, azure. Motto Virtute non verbis (By courage, not words). Orders The Most Noble Order of the Garter - Knight Companion (KG). |

== Honorific eponyms ==
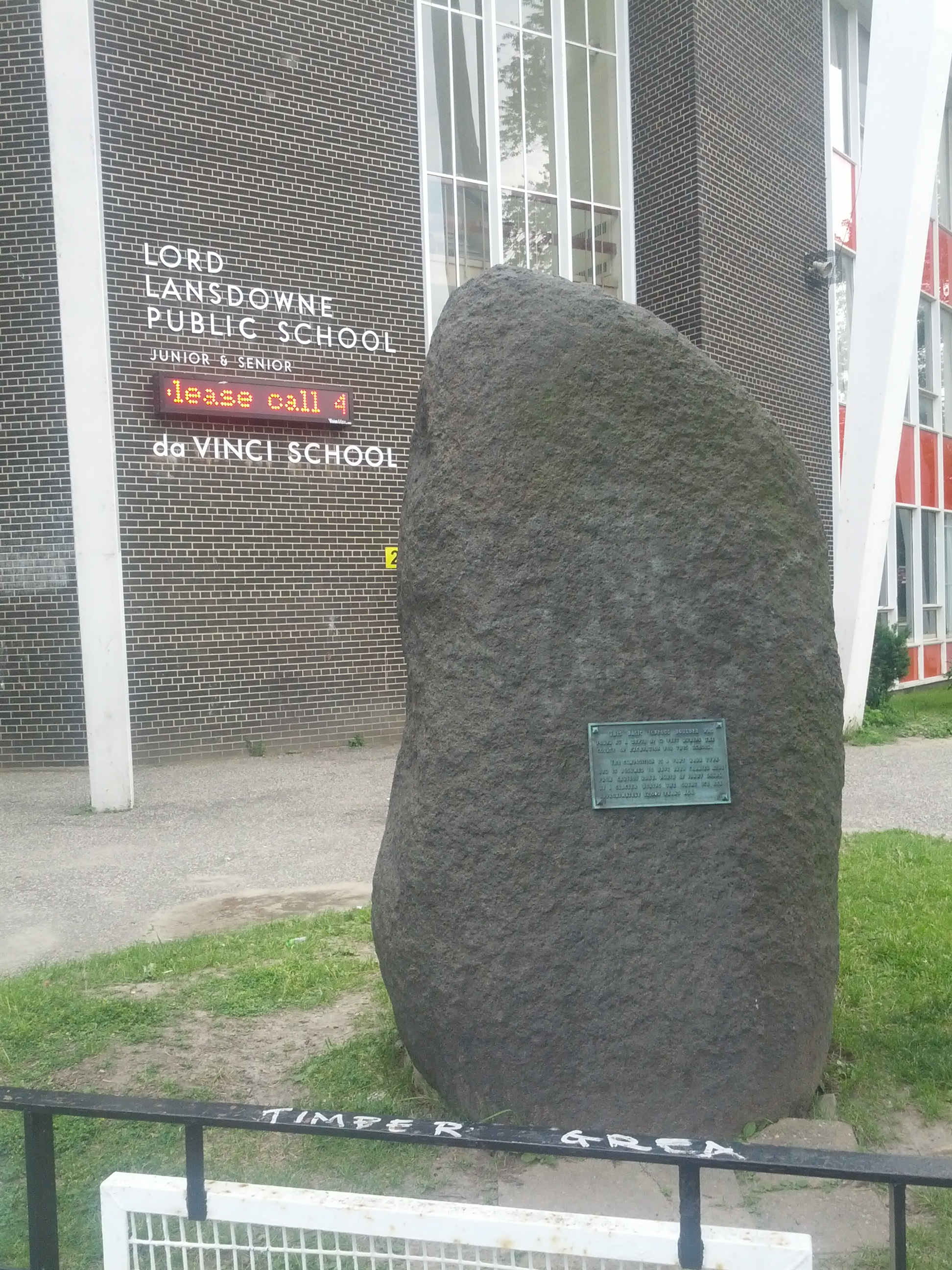
Lord Lansdowne Public School and its famous stone at Robert Street, Toronto, Ontario, Canada

Geographic locations:

- The town of Lansdowne in India
- Ontario: Lansdowne Avenue, Toronto
- Ontario: Lansdowne Street, Sudbury
- Ontario: Lansdowne Park, Ottawa
- Ontario: Lansdowne Street, Peterborough
- Ontario: Lansdowne Avenue, Sarnia
- New Brunswick: Lansdowne Street, Campbellton
- New Brunswick: Lansdowne Street, Fredericton
- Quebec: (Upper) Lansdowne Avenue, Westmount
- Saskatchewan: Lansdowne Avenue, Imperial
- : Mount Lansdowne, Yukon 60.509906°N 134.555459°W
- Lansdowne Road, Kolkata, India.
- Lansdowne, Nova Scotia
- British Columbia:Lansdowne Road, Saanich

Schools:

- Ontario: Lansdowne Public School, Sudbury
- Ontario: Lord Lansdowne Public School, Toronto
- Manitoba: Lansdowne Public School, Winnipeg
- Ontario: Lansdowne Public School, Sarnia

Bridge:

- Lansdowne Bridge, Rohri, Sindh, Pakistan – a rigid girder bridge built 1879–1887 used by railway traffic

Buildings:

- Lansdowne Building, Mysore, Karnataka, India, c. 1892 – a market being repaired and restored after a partial collapse in 2012
- Lansdowne Court, Kolkata, India – residential development
- Lansdowne Hall, Cooch Behar, India – Community Hall, Library, Masonic Purposes. now Cooch Behar District Magistrate's Office

Market:

- Lansdowne Market, Kolkata, India.

Station:

- Lansdowne (TTC), Toronto
- Lansdowne station (SkyTrain), Vancouver

Education:

- McGill University, Montreal, 1884, honorific Doctor of law

Political offices
| Preceded by Edward Stanhope | Under-Secretary of State for India; 1880 | Succeeded by Viscount Enfield |
| Preceded by Sir Henry Campbell-Bannerman | Secretary of State for War; 1895–1900 | Succeeded by William St John Brodrick |
| Preceded by The Marquess of Salisbury | Foreign Secretary; 1900–1905 | Succeeded by Sir Edward Grey, Bt |
| Preceded by The Duke of Devonshire | Leader of the House of Lords; 1903–1905 | Succeeded by The Marquess of Ripon |
| Preceded by The Duke of Devonshire | Leader of the Conservative Party in the House of Lords; 1903–1916 | Succeeded by The Earl Curzon of Kedleston |
| Preceded by Arthur Balfour | Leader of the Conservative Party; 1911–1916; With: Bonar Law | Succeeded by Bonar Law |
Party political offices
| Preceded by The Duke of Devonshire | Leader of the Conservative Party in the House of Lords; 1903–1916 | Succeeded by The Earl Curzon of Kedleston |
Government offices
| Preceded by The Marquess of Lorne | Governor General of Canada; 1883–1888 | Succeeded by The Lord Stanley of Preston |
| Preceded by The Earl of Dufferin | Viceroy of India; 1888–1894 | Succeeded by The Earl of Elgin |
Honorary titles
| Preceded by The Marquess of Bath | Lord Lieutenant of Wiltshire; 1896–1920 | Succeeded by Walter Hume Long |
Peerage of Great Britain
| Preceded by Henry Petty-Fitzmaurice | Marquess of Lansdowne; 1866–1927 | Succeeded by Henry Petty-Fitzmaurice |
Peerage of Scotland
| Preceded by Emily Petty-Fitzmaurice | Lord Nairne; 1895–1927 | Succeeded by Henry Petty-Fitzmaurice |
