= Villa Sainte-Marcelline =

Coordinates: 45°29′22″N 73°37′04″W

Villa Sainte-Marcelline is a private French school located in Westmount, Quebec. It is an all-girl school from kindergarten up to grade 11.

== History ==
In September 1959, the Marcelline nuns opened an all-girls school to 66 students in the "Aimé Geoffrion" mansion on Upper Belmont Avenue in Westmount. Six years later, the school bought the house next door. In 1988, it undertook major construction work to join both houses and create a bigger school. Henceforth, the students benefitted from a new gym, auditorium and several science labs. With the expansion of the school, the student population grew and diversified its extracurriculars. It became a first choice school for elite French families and wealthy English families wanting to integrate their children in a French environment to improve their command of the French language.

Nowadays the school is known to be the only French private school in Westmount and the one located at the very top of the Hill. Often, the acronym 'VSM' is used to replace the school's full name.

In 2005, the school expanded yet again, building an adjacent complex containing a gym, a new cafeteria, a computer lab, a library and class spaces for the CEGEP. The CEGEP closed down in April 2020.

In recent years, VSM was one of the last schools in Montreal to have Catholic nuns living on-site and teaching students. The Sainte Marcelline Order's mission is to educate the women of the future. Some nuns taught religion, French and even mathematics. In 2019, sixty years after the arrival of the Marcelline nuns in Westmount, the majority retired and went back to Milan, Italy, where the Order is based. Nuns that were born and raised in Quebec moved outside the school and come for monthly visits.

The school is also one of the few in Montreal that offers a quadrilingual program (English, French, Spanish and German) throughout the whole secondary (with the exception of German, which is taught in grade 4 and 5 of secondary).

== See also ==
- Collège international des Marcellines
- List of colleges in Quebec
