= Curraghmore =

Coordinates: 52.289°N 7.360°W

Curraghmore House
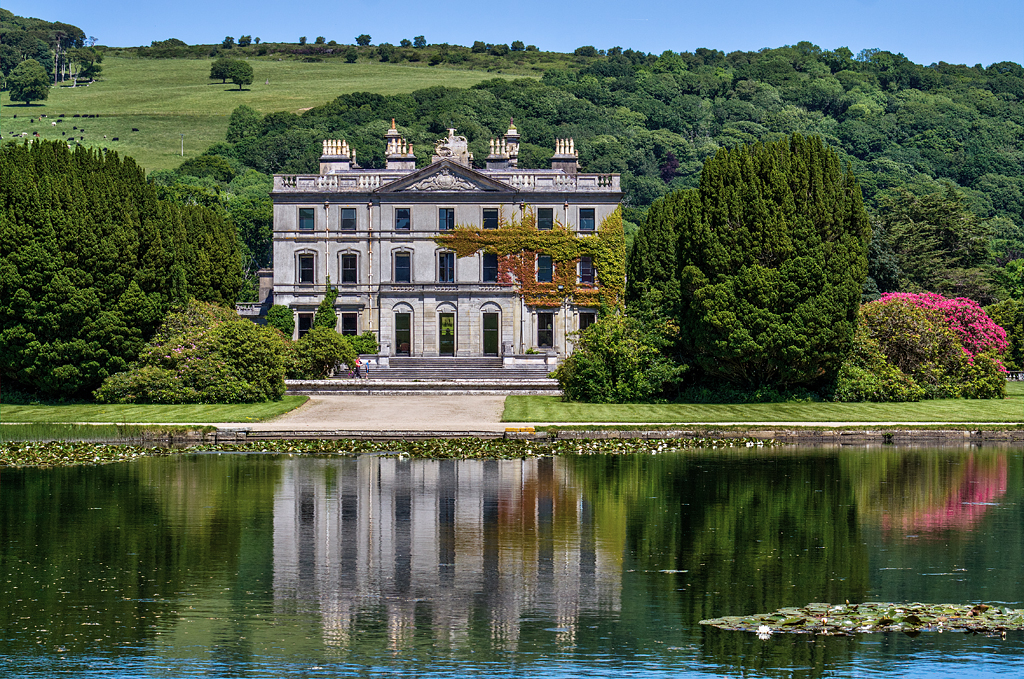
- A view of Curraghmore House

- Location within Ireland

General information
- Status: Private dwelling house
- Type: House
- Architectural style: Georgian
- Location: Portlaw, County Waterford, Ireland
- Completed: 1755 (Prior structures from 1654 and 1700)
- Renovated: 1875
- Owner: Henry Beresford, 9th Marquess of Waterford

Design and construction
- Architects: John Roberts (1775); James Wyatt - interiors (1780); William Tinsley - farm and stable buildings (1850); Samuel Usher Roberts - remodelling (1875)
- Developer: Beresford-Power family
- Other designers: Paolo and Filippo Lafranchini - billiard room ceiling (1746); John van Nost the younger - statue of Catherine, Countess of Tyrone (1754); Peter DeGree - Circular medallions in drawing room ceiling and oval panels in dining room (1787); Joseph Edgar Boehm - family crest on tower and pediment (1870)

Website
- curraghmorehouse.ie

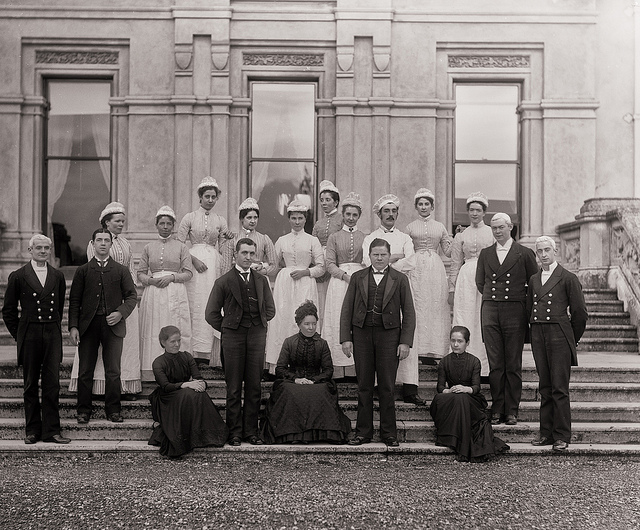
Staff of Curraghmore House, Co Waterford, c. 1905

Curraghmore near Portlaw, County Waterford, Ireland, is a historic house and estate and the seat of the Marquess of Waterford. The estate was part of the grant of land made to Sir Roger le Puher (la Poer) by Henry II in 1177 after the Anglo-Norman invasion of Ireland. Since then, the De La Poer Beresford family has owned these estates. It is the oldest family home in Ireland.

== History ==
Curraghmore House is the De La Poer Beresford family estate that once covered around 39,000 acres. The family remain amongst the largest land owners in all Ireland. Curraghmore near Waterford in South East Ireland, had stables for 100 horses and employed 600 people. The family has been heavily involved in hunting throughout the centuries, to the point where members of the family have been killed in riding accidents. On the south drive spanning over the river Clodagh is King John's Bridge, built for the King's arrival in 1205. It is Ireland's oldest bridge. The mediaeval park is surrounded by a fourteen-mile famine relief boundary wall, making it the world's longest estate wall. Before the 5th Marquess removed it, the fountain in front of the house was the tallest in Europe. Now surrounded by c.3,500 acres of formal gardens, woodland and grazing fields. This makes it Ireland's largest private demesne.

The estate was owned by the la Poer (Power) family for over 500 years, during which time the family gained the titles Baron la Poer (1535), and Viscount Decies and Earl of Tyrone (1673, second creation). However, in 1704 the male line of the la Poers became extinct. The estate was inherited by Lady Catherine la Poer who married Sir Marcus Beresford in 1717. He was elevated to the peerage in 1720 as Baron Beresford and Viscount Tyrone, and in 1746 he was created 1st Earl of Tyrone (third creation). The Beresford-Power family have held the estate ever since. The 1st Earl's eldest son George was created 1st Marquess of Waterford in 1789. The current Lord Waterford, Henry Nicholas de la Poer Beresford, 9th Marquess of Waterford inherited the title on the death of his father John Hubert de La Poer Beresford, 8th Marquess of Waterford in February 2015 and moved into Curraghmore. Lord and Lady Waterford plan to develop the estate, promote tourism and open the house more regularly. Gerrit van Honthorst, Rubens, Sir Thomas Lawrence, Joshua Reynolds, and Thomas Gainsborough are among the artists represented within the house. A special family treasure is a pearl necklace that was once owned by Mary Queen of Scots, who gave it to Mary Hamilton the night before the Queen's execution.

It is believed that a castle was erected on the site in the twelfth century, however the core of the current house is a medieval tower-house. This was extended in 1700 when a house was built around a court with the medieval tower-house incorporated at the north-eastern side. A forecourt with stables was added in the 1750s or 1760s and the house was refurbished in the 1780s. Samuel Usher Roberts, a grandson of the Waterford architect John Roberts, is credited with encasing the main block of the house in the late 19th century. The forecourt, flanked by ranges of outbuildings, is described by the National Inventory of Architectural Heritage as “without precedent or parallel in Ireland”.

=== All Together Now festival ===
Starting in 2018, the estate had held the All Together Now music festival in the grounds of the estate on the August bank holiday weekend. The event took place on the August Bank Holiday weekend in 2018, 2019, 2022, 2023, 2024, 2025 and 2026.
