= Portlaw =

Town in County Waterford, Ireland

Portlaw Port Lách
- Town
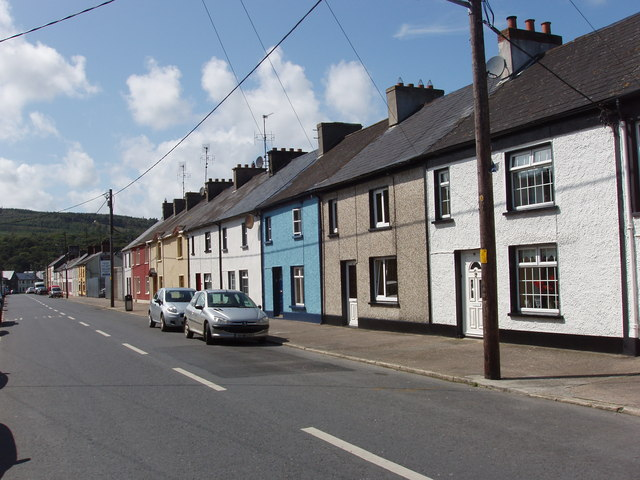
- Main street of Portlaw

- Location in Ireland
- Coordinates: 52°17′20″N 7°18′53″W
- Country: Ireland
- Province: Munster
- County: Waterford
- Elevation: 40 m (130 ft)

Population (2022)
  - Total: 1,881
- Time zone: UTC+0 (WET)
  - Summer (DST): UTC-1 (IST (WEST))
- Irish Grid Reference: S468154

Portlaw (Irish: Port Cládach or Port Lách) is a town in County Waterford, Ireland. It is also a parish in the Roman Catholic Diocese of Waterford and Lismore. It is 14 km west of Waterford city, where the Clodiagh meets the Suir.

== History ==
=== Establishment and development ===
Portlaw was established by the Malcomson family in the early 19th century (being heavily influenced by Robert Owen's New Lanark), with David Malcomson playing a key role in establishing the cotton spinning and weaving industry that was present. It represents one of a few cases in which a model village was established in the southern regions of Ireland, as they were more commonly found in the North.

During the 19th century, Portlaw was home to the most successful attempt at creating a cotton industry in Ireland and created just over one and a half thousand jobs for the local residents, which naturally allowed the village to evolve in a positive manner over time. This development is linked to the fact that the Malcolmsons were a Quaker family. The concept of enhancing the ones personal development and creating an environment in which one could live a healthy lifestyle was at the core of the creation of the village, as the Malcolmsons founded a number of social institutions in which their residents could grow as individuals and spend their free time.

In the mid-nineteenth century, the Malcomsons of Portlaw became associated with the Richardsons of Bessbrook, who were also Quakers. The marriage of James N. Richardson III (Bessbrook) and Sarah Sophia (Portlaw) created an alliance between two of the richest families in Ireland, with potential evidence of Portlaw being found in Bessbrook in the form of curved felt roofs on some of the housing dwellings similar to the ones featured in Portlaw.

Portlaw was developed in two stages, one that commenced in the mid-1820s and the second that began in the 1850s. The first development stage saw the building of houses that had some uniformity and planning depending on the area of the village they were built; however the first village development was slowly demolished in order to make way for the second village development, which had a more consistent and uniformed pattern of building. The second development adopted a plan type that had come to fruition during the Renaissance in Europe, called the "Polyvium".

This planning type involved building triangular blocks linked to a central open space. This central open space (also known as the Square) housed different types of institutions, including a post office and a school facility.

=== Social history ===
During the 19th century, the Malcomsons established stores in the village that sold clothes and groceries amongst other basic needs, while other establishments such as bakeries were also present. The implementation of a different payday per factory department ensured that every day had the potential to be a shopping day. This meant that there was a need for workers in these social establishments as there was business spread across the week, rather than having one or two days where there was a mass appeal for goods and services.

One of the more heavily encouraged aspects of social life within the community at Portlaw was the concept of temperance. Temperance was encouraged through the use of preachers from England speaking to the workers and the establishment of the Portlaw tontine club in 1838, which punished its members financially if the rules of the society were broken.

David Malcomson in particular, was committed to ensuring that education was present in Portlaw, as it had not been a factor that was present in his own childhood, and this commitment continued after his death as he pledged funds for different schools.

=== Later decline ===
Historical population
| Year | Pop. | ±% |
|---|---|---|
| 1813 | 292 | — |
| 1821 | 395 | +35.3% |
| 1831 | 1,618 | +309.6% |
| 1841 | 3,647 | +125.4% |
| 1851 | 4,351 | +19.3% |
| 1861 | 3,852 | −11.5% |
| 1871 | 3,774 | −2.0% |
| 1881 | 1,891 | −49.9% |
| 1891 | 1,394 | −26.3% |
| 1901 | 1,101 | −21.0% |
| 1911 | 947 | −14.0% |
| 1926 | 809 | −14.6% |
| 1936 | 847 | +4.7% |
| 1946 | 1,010 | +19.2% |
| 1951 | 925 | −8.4% |
| 1956 | 1,120 | +21.1% |
| 1961 | 1,113 | −0.6% |
| 1966 | 1,154 | +3.7% |
| 1971 | 1,166 | +1.0% |
| 1981 | 1,252 | +7.4% |
| 1986 | 1,260 | +0.6% |
| 1991 | 1,151 | −8.7% |
| 1996 | 1,176 | +2.2% |
| 2002 | 1,183 | +0.6% |
| 2006 | 1,495 | +26.4% |
| 2011 | 1,696 | +13.4% |
| 2016 | 1,742 | +2.7% |
| 2022 | 1,881 | +8.0% |

The cotton industry was central to the local economy and lasted half a decade before it became bankrupt in 1876. The workforce in the factory comprised different genders and ages, with females aged thirteen and over claiming the majority from 1835 to 1874. The slow failure of the cotton industry in Portlaw ultimately began three years prior to declaring bankruptcy, as cotton prices all over the world began to decline. Although the industry in Portlaw was able to survive the problems and challenges faced by the American civil war in the 1860s, it was unable to cope with this decline in the industry, which inevitably led to the decline of Portlaw as a century-old industrial village. A tanning facility was opened in 1935, in the ruins of the original 19th-century cotton mill.

This, however, had a negative effect on the surrounding areas as the refuse from the tannery was pumped into the mill pond, which saw waste flowing over the level of the surrounding grounds. The industrial area of Portlaw was sold in 1995; however over time, the amenities and structures in the area were not put to any use, meaning that they subsequently deteriorated.

In 2021, the original home of the Malcomson family, Mayfield House (now derelict and uninhabitable), was put on the market for just under €800,000.

== Amenities ==
The town has grocery shops, a pharmacy, a library, pubs, a cafe, fast food takeaways, a heritage centre, a primary school, a pre-school crèche and Roman Catholic and Church of Ireland churches.

Curraghmore House, sitting on the outskirts of the town, is a manor house surrounded by 40 ha of land. It has been opened to visitors by Henry Beresford, 9th Marquess of Waterford, and hosts annual tourist and charity events, such as the Bluebell Festival and All Together Now music festival.

== Transport ==
As of late 2022, Bus Éireann operates a bus route linking Portlaw to Waterford.

Fiddown and Portlaw railway station was a station in nearby Fiddown on the line between Waterford and Limerick. The station closed in 1963, and the station building was converted to residential use.

== See also ==
- List of towns and villages in Ireland
