= Gould family =

American business family

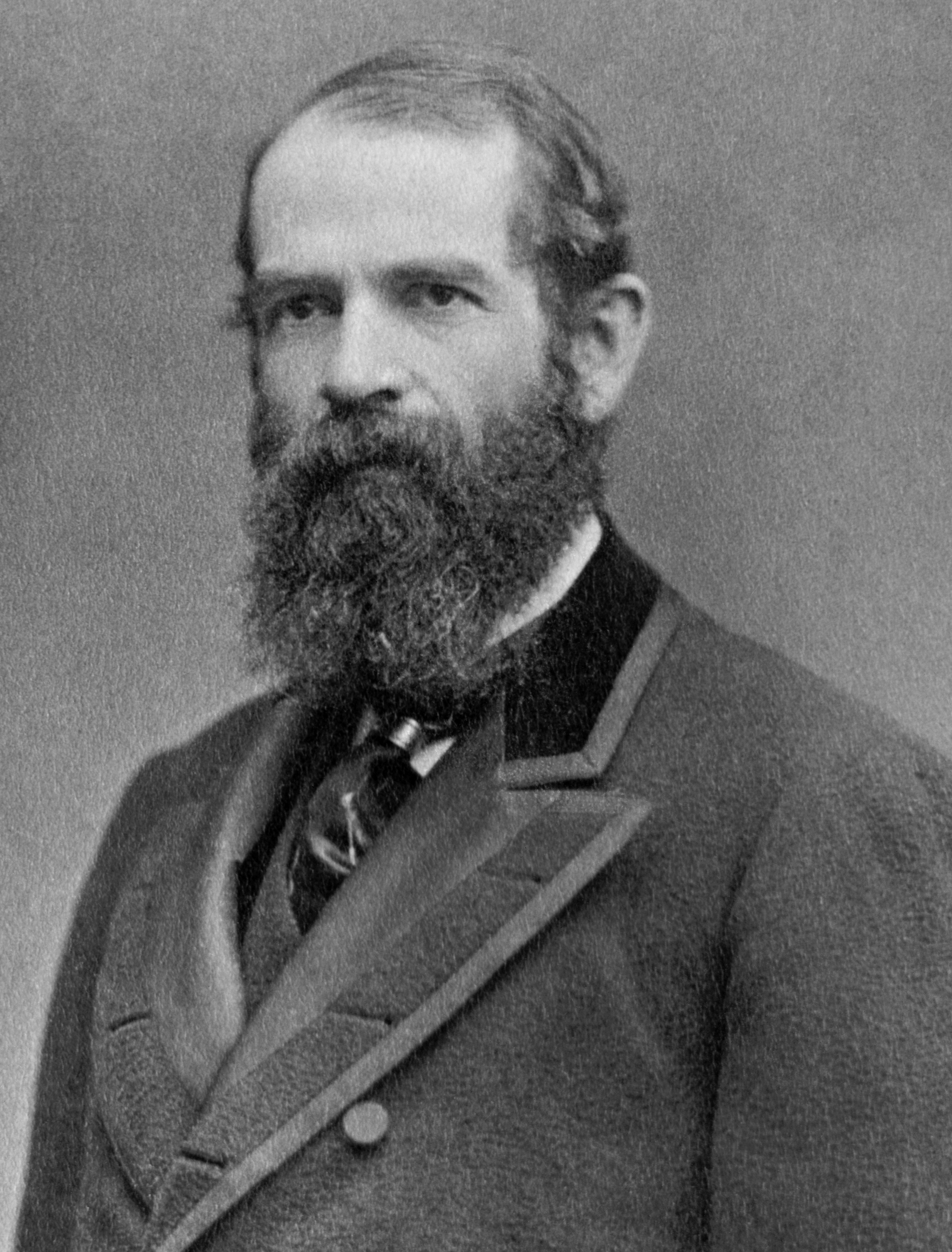
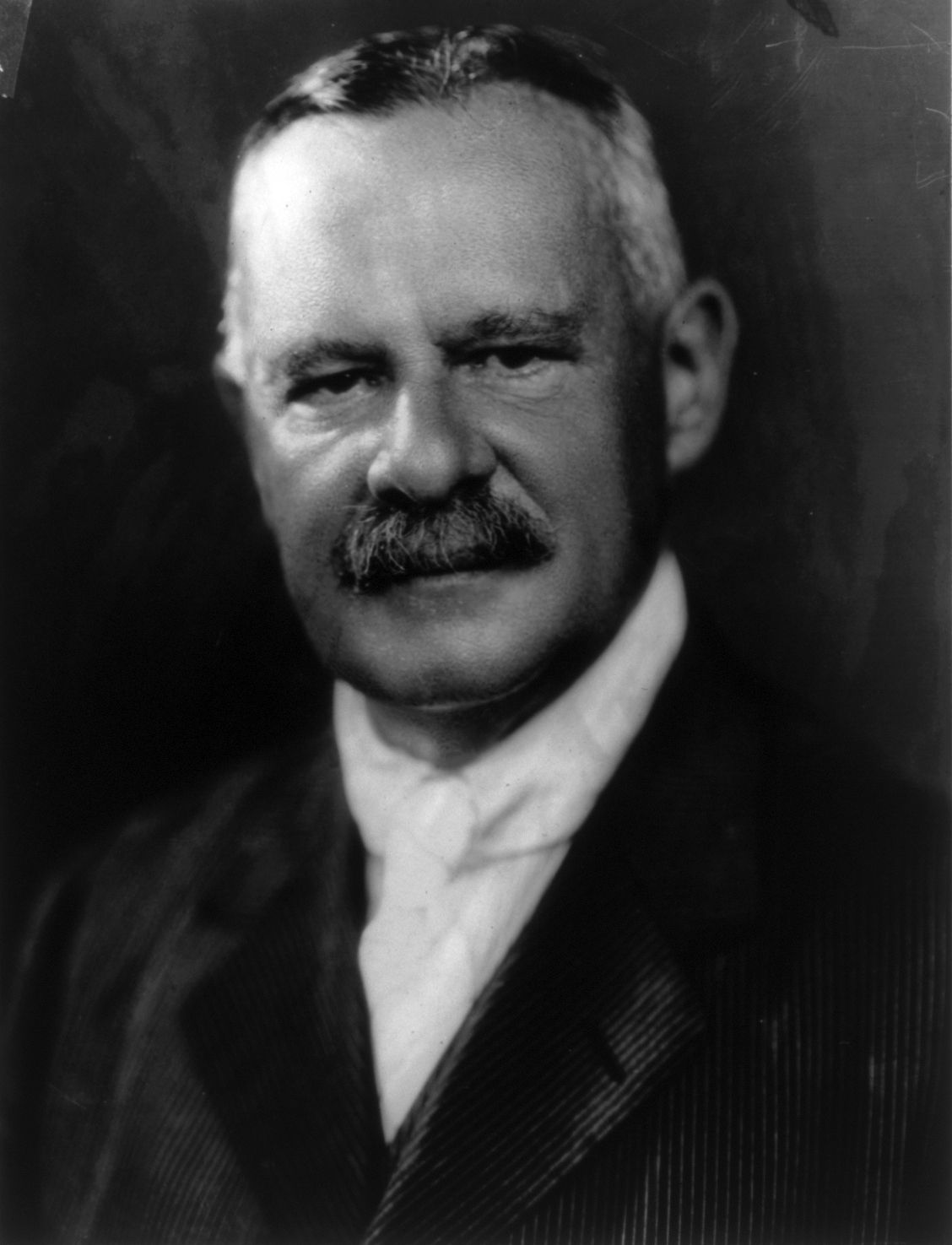
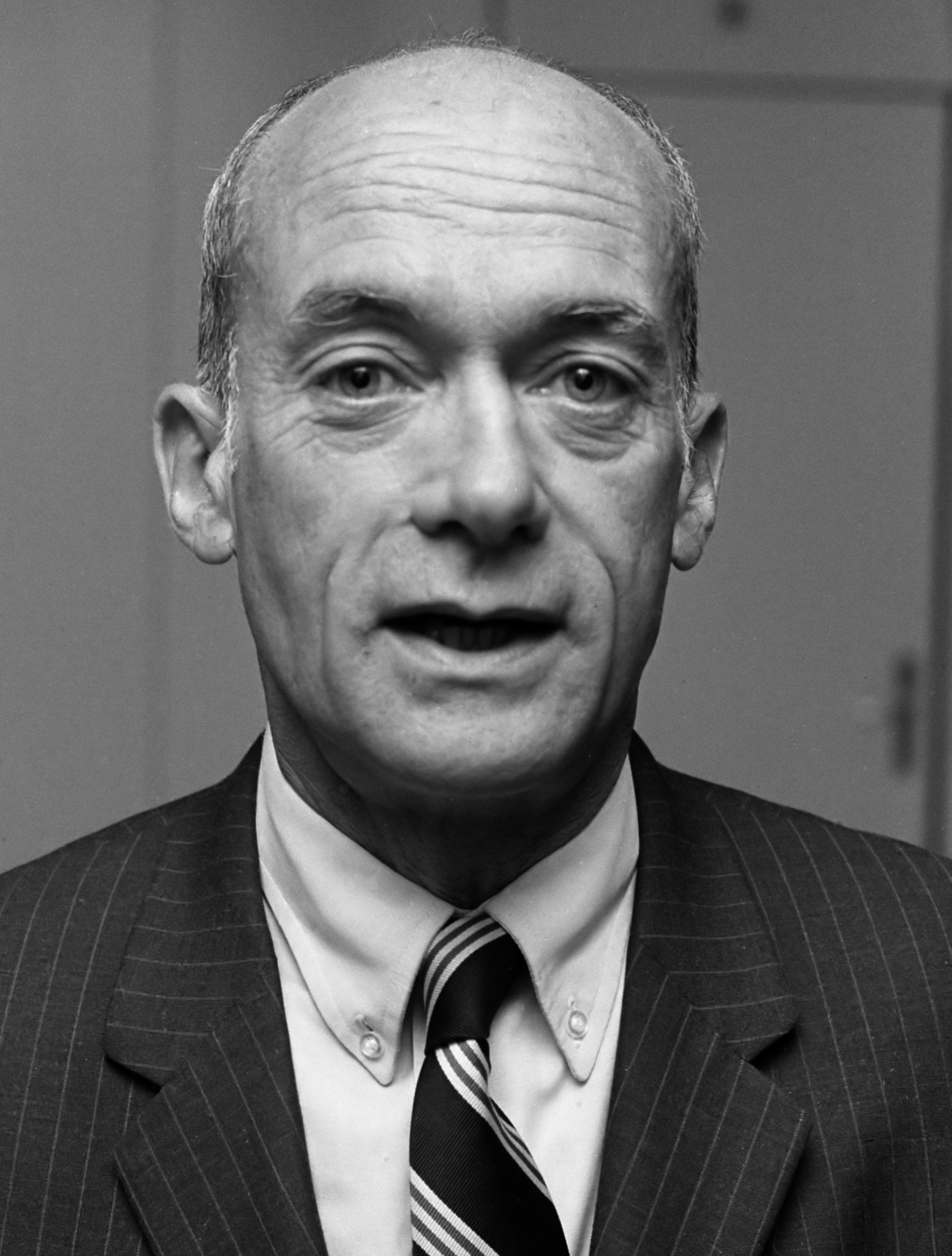
- Jay Gould George Jay Gould Kingdon Gould Jr.
- Current region: New York, U.S.
- Origin: Suffolk, England
- Founded: 1650; 376 years ago
- Founder: Major Nathan Gold
- Connected families: Beresford family Drexel family House of Talleyrand-Périgord
- Estates: Lyndhurst; Hempstead House; George J. Gould House

The Gould family is a wealthy American family that came to prominence in the late 19th century. The family's fortune was primarily earned by Jason "Jay" Gould, a notorious railroad tycoon and "robber baron" during the Gilded Age. Despite losing much of their wealth over time, subsequent generations of the family continued to be involved in business, philanthropy, and politics.

== History ==
Coat of Arms of Nathan Gold

The Gould family originally settled in Fairfield, Connecticut in 1648-9 under Major Nathan Gold. He was a named petitioner of the Charter of Connecticut of 1662, and raised Gold's Dragoons of the Fairfield Militia.

His son, Nathan Gold Jr., served as Lt. Governor of the Colony, and Chief Justice of the Connecticut Supreme Court. Nathan Gold Jr.'s grandson, Lt. Col. Abraham Gould, the Patriot, was killed in action at the battle of Ridgefield, 1777. His home was burned by the British the following year. He was the first to spell his name "Gould". His son, Abraham Gould Jr. moved from Fairfield, Connecticut, West across the Hudson river to Roxbury.

The family ultimately rose to wealth and power under Jay Gould who built a massive railroad empire encompassing railways throughout the United States. At its height, this network comprised the Denver & Rio Grande, Missouri Pacific, Wheeling & Lake Erie, Wabash, Texas Pacific, Western Maryland and International-Great Northern railroads among others. By the early 20th century, the Goulds lost control over virtually all these railroads due to mismanagement by Jay's son, George Jay Gould.

== Family tree ==
- Jason "Jay" Gould
  - George Jay Gould
    - Kingdon Gould Sr.
      - Silvia Annunziata Gould (1919–1980),
      - Edith Kingdon Gould
      - Kingdon Gould Jr.
        - Harold Thorne Gould (b.1949)
        - Frank Jay Gould (b.1952)
        - Candida Gould (b.1954)
        - Caleb Comstock Gould (b.1956)
        - Annunziata Octavia Gould (b.1960)
        - Thalia Thorne Gould (b.1963)
    - Jay Gould II
      - Jay Gould III (1920–1987)
        - Anne Elena Gould (1954–1990)
        - Jay Gould IV (1961–2016)
    - Marjorie Gwynne Gould
      - Edith Kingdon Drexel (1911–1934)
      - Anthony Joseph Drexel IV (1912–1948)
      - Marjorie Gould Drexel (1916–1947)
    - Helen Vivien Gould
      - Eileen Vivien de la Poer Beresford (1912-?)
      - Catherine Moya de la Poer Beresford (1913–1967)
      - Arthur George Marcus Douglas de la Poer Beresford (1915–1992)
    - George Jay Gould II (1896–1963)
      - George Jay Gould III (1918–1985)
      - Maughan Carter Gould (1920–1986)
      - Howard Jay Gould (1928–1998)
      - Patrick Jay Gould (1934–2018)
    - Edith Catherine Gould
      - Stuyvesant Wainwright (1921–2010)
      - Caroline DePeyster Wainwright (1924–1969)
      - Carroll Livingston Wainwright Jr. (1925–2016)
    - Gloria Gould
      - Gioia Bishop (1925–1990)
  - Edwin Gould
    - Edwin Gould Jr. (1894–1917)
    - Frank Miller Gould (c.1895–1945)
      - Marianne Alice Gould (1925–1957)
      - Edwin Jay Gould (1932–1993)
  - Helen Miller Gould
  - Howard Gould
  - Anna Gould
    - Marie Louise de Castellane (b. 1896)
    - Boniface, Marquis de Castellane (1896–1946)
    - Georges Paul Ernest de Castellane (1897/9–1944)
    - Georges Gustave de Castellane (c. 1898–1946)
    - Jay (Jason) de Castellane (1902–1956)
  - Frank Jay Gould
    - Dorothy Gould Burns (1904–1969)
      - Rolande Graffenried de Villars (b. 1925)
      - Dorothy Graffenried de Villars (b. 1927)
    - Helen Margaret Gould (1902–1985)
      - Helen Daniele de Montenach (b.1924)
      - George Frank de Montenach (1926–1991)
      - Francoise Florena de Montenach (b.1929)
      - Francis Edouard Maret (b.1944)

== Network ==
=== Associates ===
The following is a list of figures closely aligned with or subordinate to the Gould family.

- Dominic F. Antonelli Jr.
- S. H. H. Clark
- Abel Corbin
- John F. Dillon
- Sidney Dillon
- "Big Jim" Fisk
- Herbert Melville Hoxie
- Collis Potter Huntington
- Edward Turner Jeffery
- John C. Osgood
- John D. Rockefeller
- Russell Sage
- A. A. Talmage
- William M. Tweed
- Theodoric R. Westbrook

=== Businesses ===
The following is a list of businesses in which the Gould family have held a controlling or otherwise significant interest.

- Central Branch Union Pacific Railroad
- Central Railroad of New Jersey
- Colorado Fuel and Iron
- Continental Match Company
- Delaware, Lackawanna and Western Railroad
- Denver and Rio Grande Railway
- Erie Railroad (1868-1872)
- Gould Property Company
- Hôtel Le Provençal
- International—Great Northern Railroad
- Kansas Pacific Railway
- Manhattan Railway Company
- Missouri–Kansas–Texas Railroad
- Missouri Pacific Railway
- New York World
- Parking Management Inc.
- Rutland and Washington Railroad
- St. Louis Southwestern Railway
- Tenth National Bank
- Texas and Pacific Railway
- Union Pacific Railroad (1874-1878)
- Virginia Railway & Power Company
- Wabash Railroad
- Western Maryland Railroad
- Western Pacific Railroad
- Western Union
- Wheeling & Lake Erie Railroad

== Philanthropy & Miscellaneous Nonprofit Organizations ==
The following is a list of philanthropies and nonprofit institutions which were made by or otherwise have been closely tied to the Gould family.

- American Yacht Club (New York)
- Capital Crescent Trail
- Edwin Gould Foundation for Children
- Glenelg Country School
- Gould Memorial Library (Bronx Community College)
- Gould Park, Dobbs Ferry, New York
- Hall of Fame for Great Americans
- Jay Gould Memorial Reformed Church, part of Main Street Historic District (Roxbury, New York)
- John More Association
- Women's National War Relief Association
- Gould Hall at Robert College in Istanbul, Turkey

== Sources ==
- Douglas, George H. (2007). "Geography and Railroad Development". In Middleton, William D.; Smerk, George M.; Diehl, Roberta L. (eds.). Encyclopedia of North American Railroads. Bloomington, Indiana: Indiana University Press. p. 494. ISBN 978-0-253-34916-3.
- Drury, George H. (2007). "Colorado & Southern Railway". In Middleton, William D.; Smerk, George M.; Diehl, Roberta L. (eds.). Encyclopedia of North American Railroads. Bloomington, Indiana: Indiana University Press. p. 305. ISBN 978-0-253-34916-3.
- Hutto, Richard Jay (2006). Their Gilded Cage: The Jekyll Island Club Members. Henchard Press Ltd. ISBN 978-0-9770912-2-5.
- Keys, C.M. (January 1907). "The Sick Man of the Railroad Powers". The World's Work: A History of Our Time. XIII: 8441–8442.
- Sarokin, David; Schulkin, Jay (2020). The Corporation: Its History and Future. Cambridge Scholars Publishing. ISBN 978-1-5275-4868-8.
