= Edith Gould =

Edith Gould may refer to:

- Edith Catherine Gould (1901–1937), American heiress and writer
- Edith Kingdon Gould (1920–2004), American socialite, linguist, actress, and poet
- Edith Kingdon (1864–1921), her grandmother, American actress, married name Gould
