= Kingdon =

Kingdon is a surname. Notable people with the surname include:

- John Abernethy Kingdon (1828–1906), English historian and surgeon
- Tully Kingdon (1835–1907), English Anglican bishop
- William Kingdon Clifford FRS (1845–1879), English mathematician and philosopher
- Edith Kingdon (1864–1921), American actress
- Frank Kingdon-Ward (1885–1958), English botanist, explorer, plant collector and author
- Frank Kingdon (1894–1972), American activist and educator
- Billy Kingdon (1907–1977), English footballer
- Edith Kingdon Gould (1920–2004), American socialite, linguist, actress, and poet
- Guy Kingdon Natusch (1921–2020), New Zealand architect
- Jonathan Kingdon (born 1935), Tanzanian-British zoologist
- John W. Kingdon (born 1940), American political scientist
- Mark D. Kingdon, American chief executive officer
- Mark E. Kingdon, American hedge fund manager
- Kingdon Gould, multiple people

== See also ==
- Kingdon trap, type of ion trap
- Kingdom
