= Marjorie Gould Drexel =

American heiress and socialite

Marjorie Drexel
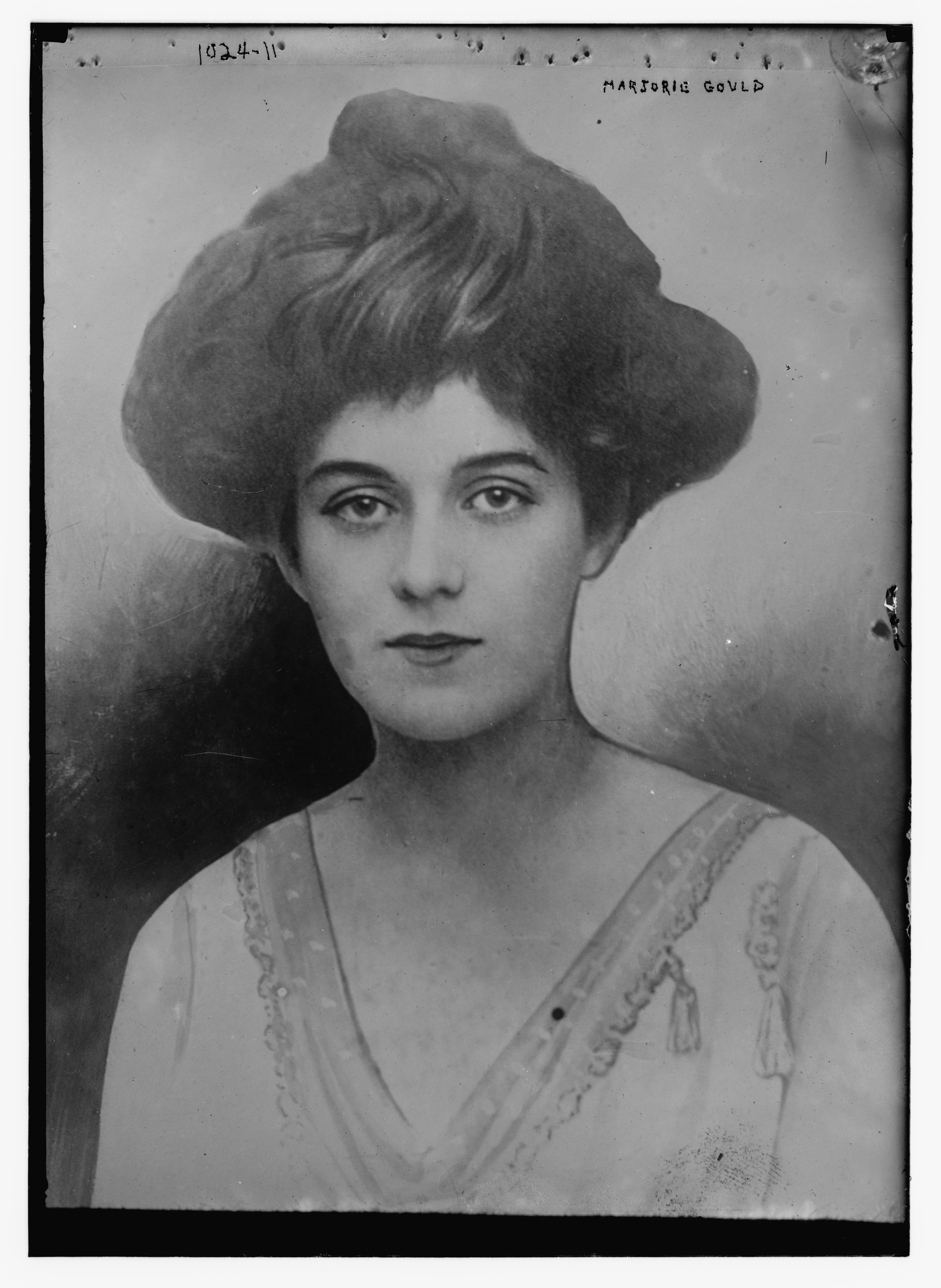
- Born: Marjorie Gwynne Gould; September 11, 1891; Manhattan, New York, U.S.
- Died: November 29, 1955 (aged 64); Manhattan, New York, U.S.
- Spouse: Anthony Joseph Drexel III (m. 1910; died 1946)
- Children: 3
- Parent(s): George Jay Gould I Edith Kingdon
- Relatives: Jay Gould (grandfather)

Marjorie Gwynne Drexel (née Gould (September 11, 1891 – November 29, 1955) was an American heiress, socialite and member of the wealthy Gould family.

== Early life ==
Marjorie was born in Manhattan on September 11, 1891. She was the eldest daughter of seven children born to millionaire George Jay Gould I (1864–1923) and actress Edith Kingdon Gould (1864–1921). Among her siblings were Kingdon Gould Sr., Jay Gould II, Helen Vivien Gould (wife of John Beresford, 5th Baron Decies), George Jay Gould II, Edith Catherine Gould (later Lady MacNeal), and Gloria Gould (wife of Henry A. Bishop II and Wallace McFarlane Barker).

Her father was the eldest son of the former Helen Day Miller and Jay Gould, a leading American railroad developer and speculator who has been referred to as one of the ruthless robber barons of the Gilded Age, whose success at business made him one of the richest men of his era. Her aunt, Anna Gould, was married to two European aristocrats, Boni de Castellane (the elder son and heir apparent of the Marquis of Castellane) and Hélie de Talleyrand-Périgord, Duke of Sagan (Boni's cousin).

Marjorie grew up in her parents' home in Lakewood, New Jersey, where she was educated "under the superintendence of her mother, who with the help of governesses, directed her daughter's training in a way to fit her best for her position in life." She traveled extensively, both in the United States and in Europe and spoke three languages.

== Personal life ==
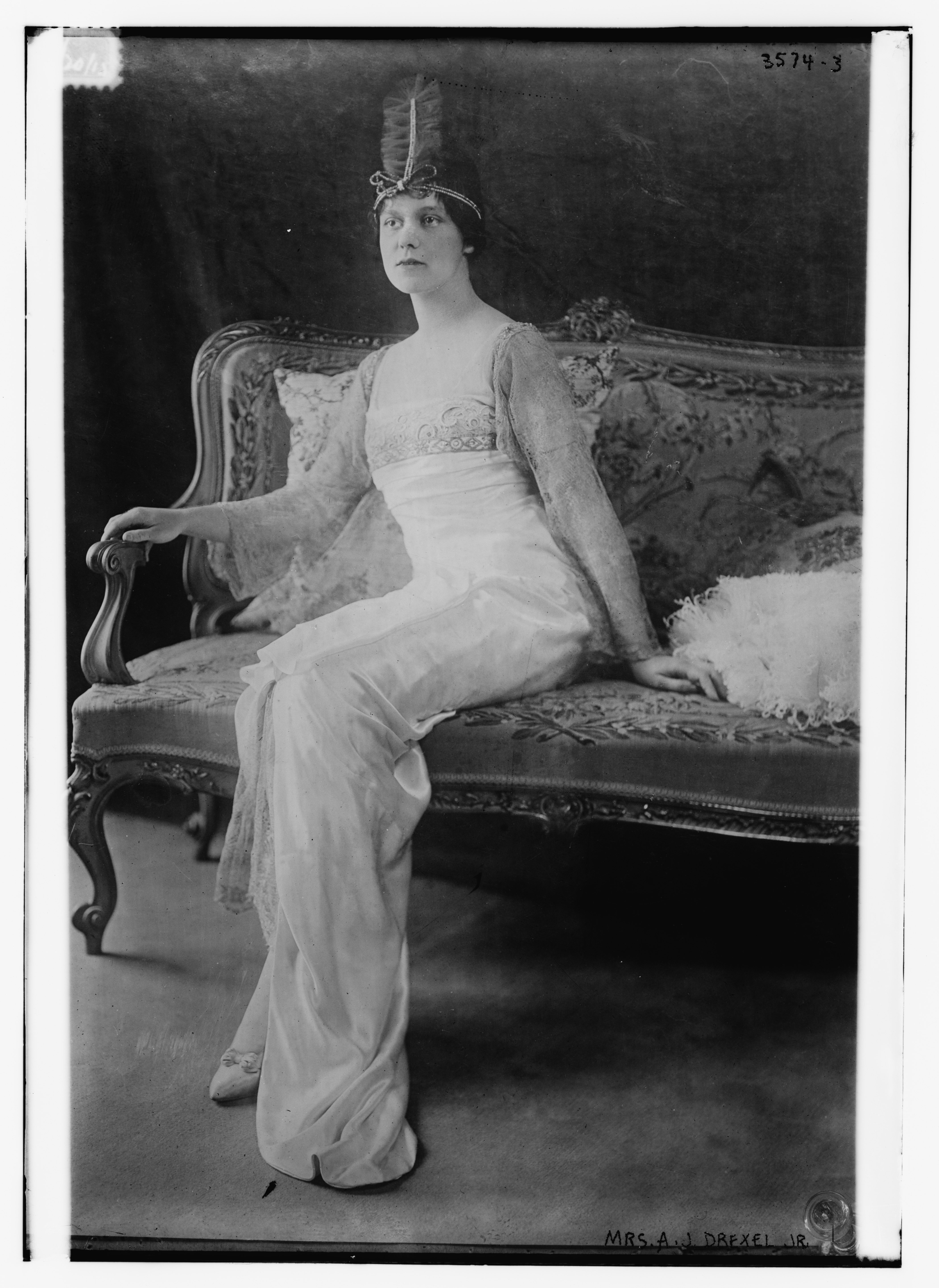
Mrs. A.J. Drexel, Jr., 1910

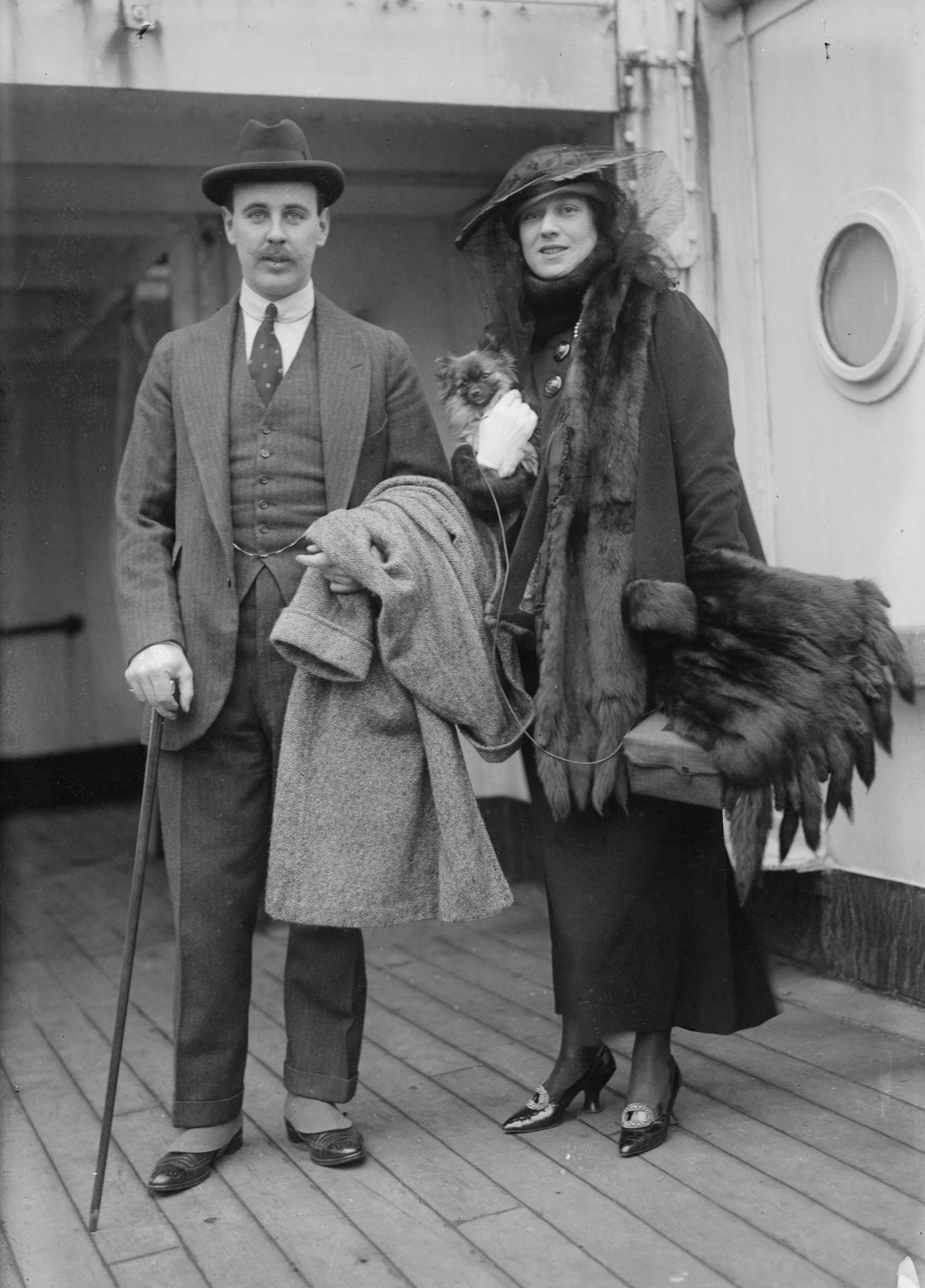
Anthony and Marjorie, 1916

In 1910, Marjorie was married to Anthony Joseph Drexel III, at St. Bartholomew's Episcopal Church in New York City before 3,000 invited guests. Drexel, who was educated at Eton in England, was a son of Anthony Joseph Drexel, Jr. and a grandson of Anthony Joseph Drexel. While in New York City, they resided at 1015 Fifth Avenue. They also owned a home in Lakewood, New Jersey, and Caprice, a home in the Cable Beach community near Nassau, Bahamas. Together, they were the parents of:

- Edith Kingdon Drexel (1911–1934), who married Henry Sergeant Cram (1907–1997), son of John Sergeant Cram and Edith Claire Bryce, in 1931. After her early death, Cram married Ruth Vaux, a granddaughter of Richard Vaux.
- Anthony Joseph Drexel IV (1912–1948), who married Helen Avis Howard (1911–1974), a daughter of Dr. Clinton Chappell Howard who became a prominent character in the John Berendt non-fiction novel Midnight in the Garden of Good and Evil.
- Marjorie Gould Drexel (1916–1947), who married John Murton Gundry Jr. (1896–1961) in 1935. They divorced in 1945 and she married Axel Julius Danielson (1897–1961) in 1946.

In 1911, her sister Vivien, married John Beresford, 5th Baron Decies. Marjorie's husband took part in a boxing match with the bridegroom's brother, Seton Beresford, which "aroused considerable comment." Following Viven's death in 1931, Lord Decies married her husband's elder cousin, Elizabeth Wharton Drexel, the daughter of Joseph William Drexel, and widow of both John Vinton Dahlgren and New York society leader Harry Lehr.

Marjorie was a member of the Regency Club, the Junior League and the Garden Club at Shelter Island where she had a summer home.

Her husband died of a heart attack at their home in Boca Grande on February 25, 1946. Marjorie Drexel, a 64 year old widow, died on November 29, 1955, at 1115 Fifth Avenue, her residence in Manhattan. She outlived her husband and all three of her children.

=== Descendants ===
Through his daughter Edith, he was a grandfather of John Sergeant Cram III (1932–2007), who married Lady Jeanne Campbell, the only daughter of Ian Campbell, 11th Duke of Argyll. She had previously been married to American writer Norman Mailer. Lady Jeanne and John had a daughter, Cusi Cram (b. 1967), an actress, a Herrick-prize-winning playwright, and an Emmy-nominated writer for the children's animated television program, Arthur.
