= Kingdon Gould Sr. =

American businessman (1887–1945)

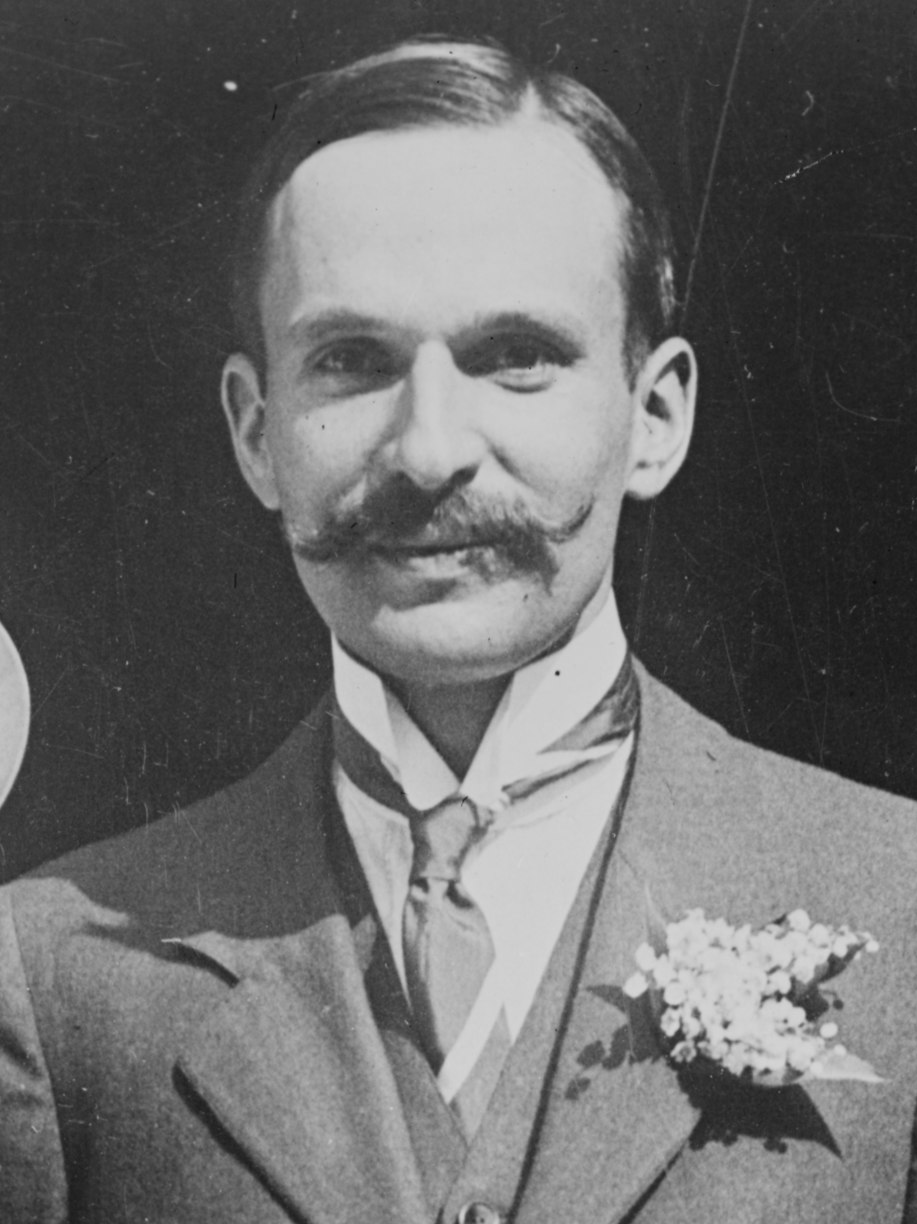
- Gould in 1917
- Born: August 15, 1887; Manhattan, New York City
- Died: November 7, 1945 (aged 58); Manhattan, New York City
- Education: Columbia University
- Spouse: Annunziata Camilla Maria Lucci (m. 1917)
- Children: 3, including Edith Kingdon Gould and Kingdon Gould Jr.
- Parent(s): George Jay Gould; Edith Kingdon
- Relatives: Jay Gould (grandfather)

Kingdon Gould Sr. (August 15, 1887 – November 7, 1945) was an American financier, champion polo player and member of the wealthy Gould family.

== Early life ==
He was born on August 15, 1887, in Manhattan, New York City, the eldest son born to George Jay Gould I and Edith M. Kingdon. Among his siblings were Jay Gould II, Marjorie Gwynne Gould (wife of Anthony Joseph Drexel III), Helen Vivien Gould (wife of John Beresford, 5th Baron Decies), George Jay Gould II, Edith Catherine Gould, and Gloria Gould (wife of Henry A. Bishop II and Wallace McFarlane Barker).

His namesake father was the eldest son of the former Helen Day Miller and Jay Gould, a leading American railroad developer and speculator who has been referred to as one of the ruthless robber barons of the Gilded Age, whose success at business made him one of the richest men of his era. His aunt, Anna Gould, was married to two European aristocrats, Boni de Castellane (the elder son and heir apparent of the Marquis of Castellane) and Hélie de Talleyrand-Périgord, Duke of Sagan (Boni's cousin).

He attended Columbia University and graduated from the Columbia University School of Engineering and Applied Science in 1909 with a E.M. degree. He was a member of the Delta Kappa Epsilon fraternity on campus.

== Career ==
Soon after his graduation from Columbia in 1908, he began serving on the boards of several of the so-called "Gould railroads" including the Denver and Rio Grande Western Railroad, the Missouri Pacific Railroad, the Western Pacific Railroad, and Texas and Pacific Railway, as well as the Western Union Telegraph Company.

He served as an officer in World War I with the American Expeditionary Forces, where he distinguished himself as a division observer and interpreter. After the war, he spent two years in the brokerage firm of J.N. Noyes & Co. before resigning his partnership to focus on managing the estate of his father who died in 1923.

== Personal life ==
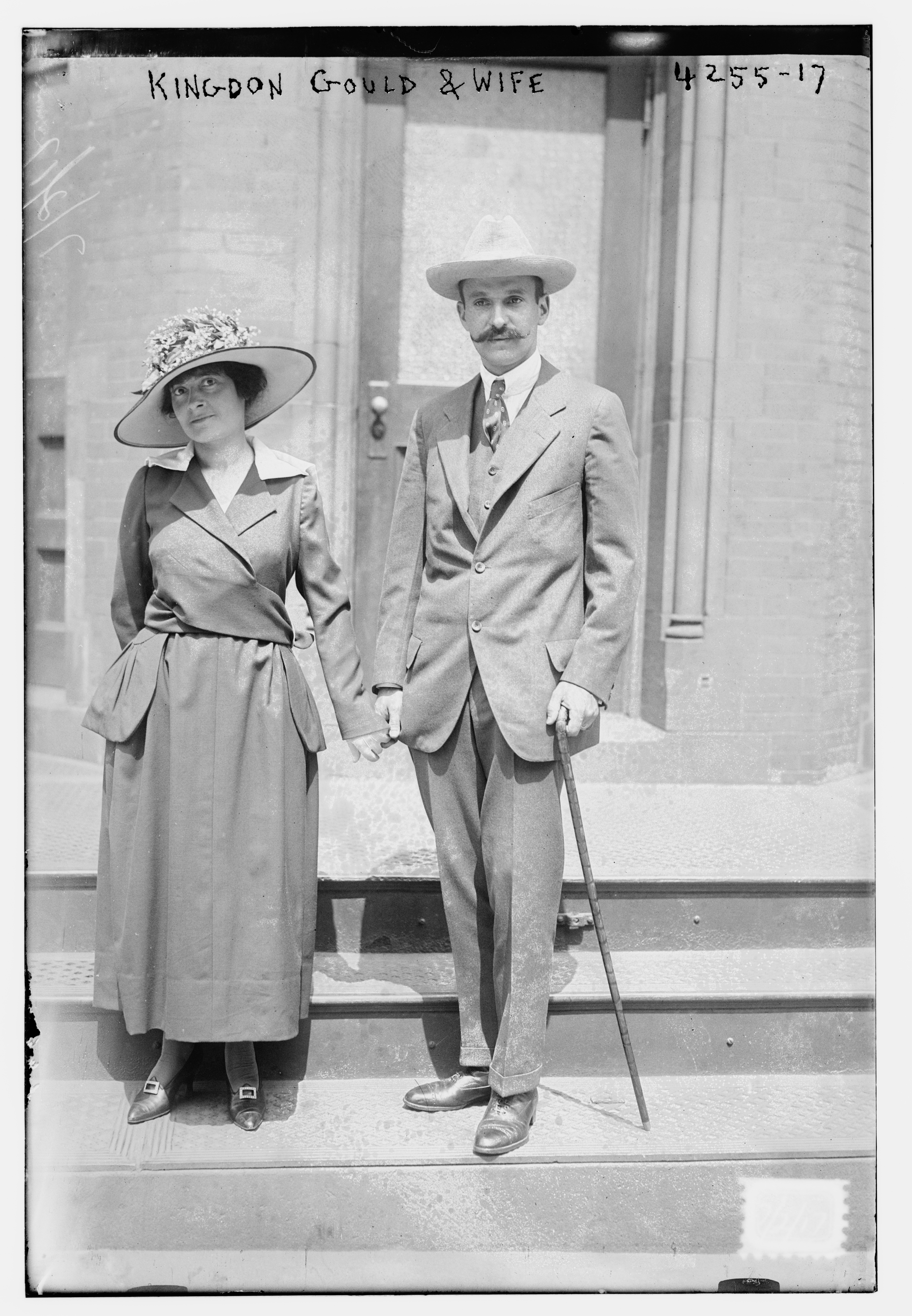
Kingdon and his wife, 1917

On July 2, 1917, Gould was married to Annunziata Camilla Maria Lucci (1890–1961) in the rectory of St. Patrick's Cathedral in Manhattan, New York City. She had been born in Arezzo, Italy and was educated at a convent in Pisa. Gould met Lucci while she was tutoring his sister Helen Vivien (later Lady Decies). Together they had the following children:

- Silvia Annunziata Gould (1919–1980), who married Charles Dabney Thomson in 1938; Robert B. Parker Jr. in 1946; Ernst Hoefer in 1949; Robert Joseph Portner in 1960; and George Romilly.
- Edith Kingdon Gould (1920–2004), who married Guy Martin (1911–2014) of the U.S. State Department.
- Kingdon Gould Jr. (1925–2018), who was Ambassador to Luxembourg and the Netherlands under Richard M. Nixon and Gerald R. Ford; he married Mary Bunce Thorne in 1946.

After their marriage, they traveled extensively and maintained a country estate, known as Furlow Lodge, in Ulster County, New York, which had been Gould's summer home as a boy. Time wrote on July 27, 1942 :

To beat the gas & rubber shortage Manhattan’s Mrs. Kingdon Gould took the old family carriages out of moth balls, sent Daughter Edith to buy a pair of horses. Inexperienced Daughter Edith came back with a pair of brewery-truck-model Percherons.

Kingdon died on November 7, 1945, at his residence, 160 East 72nd Street. He was buried in his father's mausoleum in Woodlawn Cemetery.
