= Gloria Gould =

American socialite (1906–1943)

Gloria Barker
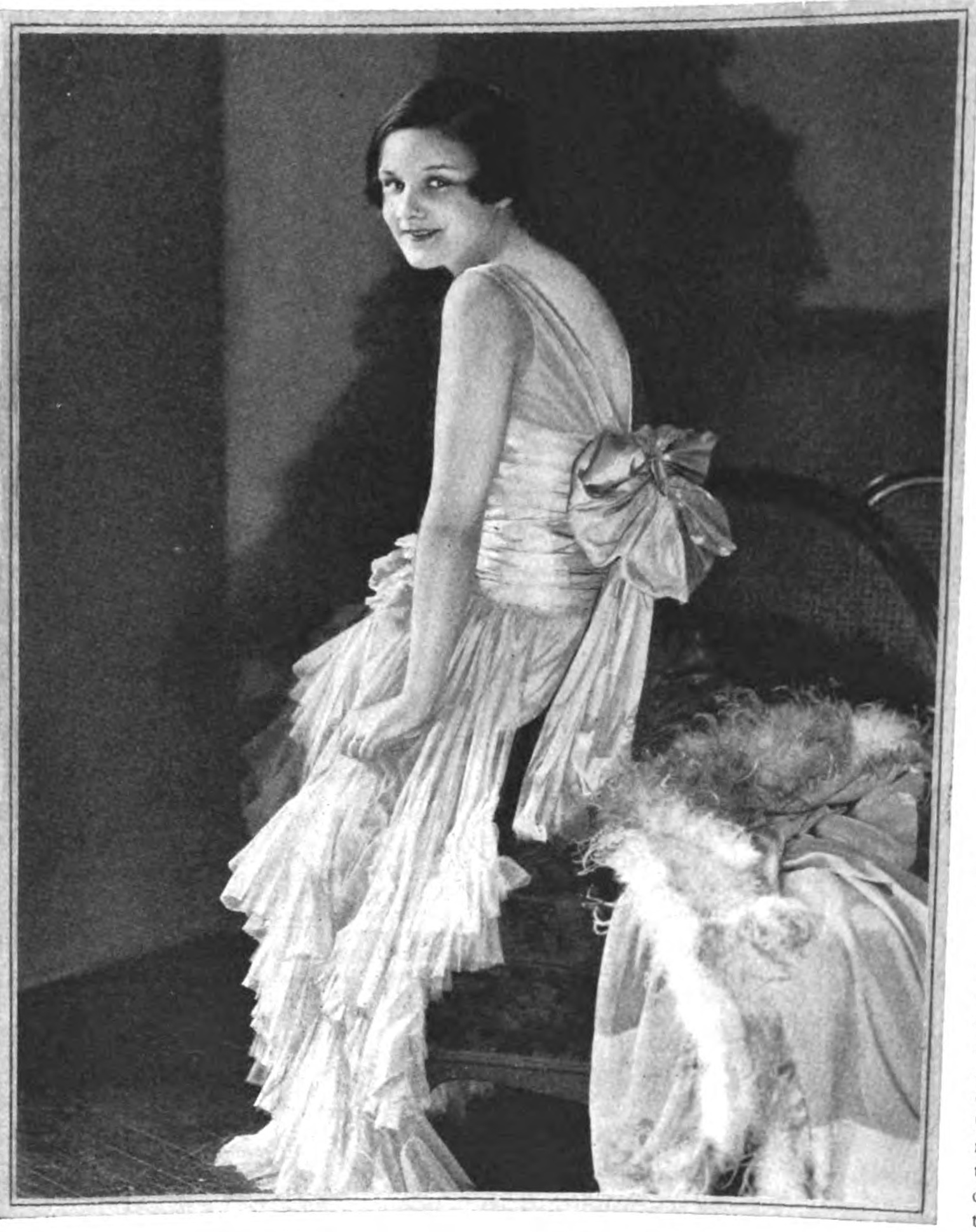
- Gloria Gould in 1925
- Born: Gloria Gould; 1906
- Died: August 15, 1943 (aged 37); Arizona, U.S.
- Spouses: Henry A. Bishop, Jr. (m. 1923; div. 1929) Wallace McFarlane Barker (m. 1930)
- Children: Gioia Bishop
- Parent(s): George Jay Gould I Edith Kingdon
- Relatives: Jay Gould (grandfather)

Gloria Gould (March 3, 1906 – August 16, 1943) was an American socialite who was the daughter of industrialist heir George Jay Gould I.

== Early life ==
She was born on March 3, 1906, the youngest daughter of George Jay Gould I. She was one of seven children born to millionaire George Jay Gould I (1864–1923) and actress Edith Kingdon Gould (1864–1921). Among her siblings were Kingdon Gould Sr., Jay Gould II, Marjorie Gwynne Gould (wife of Anthony Joseph Drexel III), Helen Vivien Gould (wife of John Beresford, 5th Baron Decies), Edith Catherine Gould, and George Jay Gould II.

Her father was the eldest son of the former Helen Day Miller and Jay Gould, a leading American railroad developer and speculator who has been referred to as one of the ruthless robber barons of the Gilded Age, whose success at business made him one of the richest men of his era. Her aunt, Anna Gould, was married to two European aristocrats, Boni de Castellane (the elder son and heir apparent of the Marquis of Castellane) and Hélie de Talleyrand-Périgord, Duke of Sagan (Boni's cousin).

== Personal life ==
In 1923 she became engaged to Henry A. Bishop, Jr., of Bridgeport, Connecticut. He was the son of Henry A. Bishop, Sr, who was the director of the Western Union Telegraph Co. Together Gloria and Henry had a daughter:

- Gioia Bishop (1925-1990), who married William Henry Grimditch (1922–2013) in 1943. They divorced and she married Charles Larkin (1925–2009) in 1954.

Gloria was the first manager of New York City's Embassy Theatre, which opened in 1925.

In 1929, Gloria divorced her first husband and she married Wallace McFarlane Barker, a son of Alfred Barker and Harriet (née Rowland) Barker, in 1930. Her first husband married Edith Weed in 1929, before his death in 1934.

Gloria drowned in the swimming pool of her home near Phoenix, Arizona in August 1943. Her widower, Walter McFarlane Barker, died in 1948.
