= George Jay Gould II =

George J. Gould
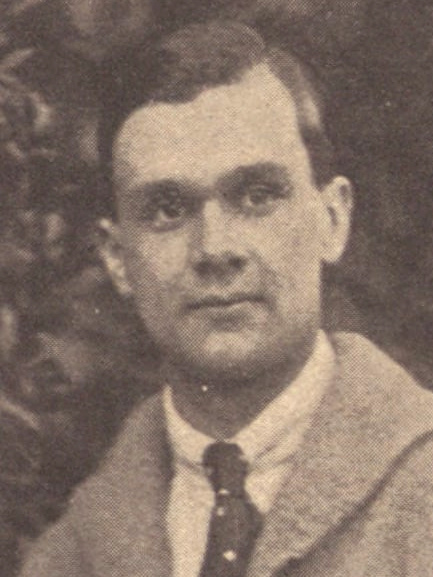
- Gould, 1917
- Born: March 28, 1896; Manhattan, New York City, US
- Died: June 7, 1963 (aged 67); Paris, France
- Education: Columbia University; Columbia Law School
- Spouses: Laura M. Carter (m. 1917; div. 1923) Marie Louise Vial (m. 1927)
- Parent(s): George Jay Gould; Edith Kingdon
- Relatives: Jay Gould (grandfather)

George Jay Gould II (March 28, 1896 – June 7, 1963) was an American lawyer and oil company executive.

== Early life ==
Gould was born on March 28, 1896, in Manhattan, New York City. He was one of seven children born to millionaire George Jay Gould I (1864–1923) and former actress Edith Kingdon Gould (1864–1921). Among his siblings were Kingdon Gould Sr., Jay Gould II, Marjorie Gwynne Gould (wife of Anthony Joseph Drexel III), Helen Vivien Gould (wife of John Beresford, 5th Baron Decies), Edith Catherine Gould, and Gloria Gould (wife of Henry A. Bishop II and Wallace McFarlane Barker).

His namesake father was the eldest son of the former Helen Day Miller and Jay Gould, a leading American railroad developer and speculator who has been referred to as one of the ruthless robber barons of the Gilded Age, whose success at business made him one of the richest men of his era. His aunt, Anna Gould, was married to two European aristocrats, Boni de Castellane (the elder son and heir apparent of the Marquis of Castellane) and Hélie de Talleyrand-Périgord, Duke of Sagan (Boni's cousin).

Gould graduated from Columbia University, where he was a member of Phi Beta Kappa (and had honors in French and History), and Columbia Law School.

== Career ==
After graduating from Columbia Law School, he went to Oil City, Pennsylvania, in February 1918 to work for the Galena Signal Oil Company. He later returned to New York City and began working at Liggett, Drexel & Co., the brokerage firm of his brother-in-law, Anthony Joseph Drexel III.

For many years, Gould lived in Camden, Maine. He also maintained an apartment in Paris, a château in Mons, France (he owned the Petit Manoir in Maxilly-sur-Léman from 1930 to 1952) and a villa in San Remo, Italy.

== Personal life ==
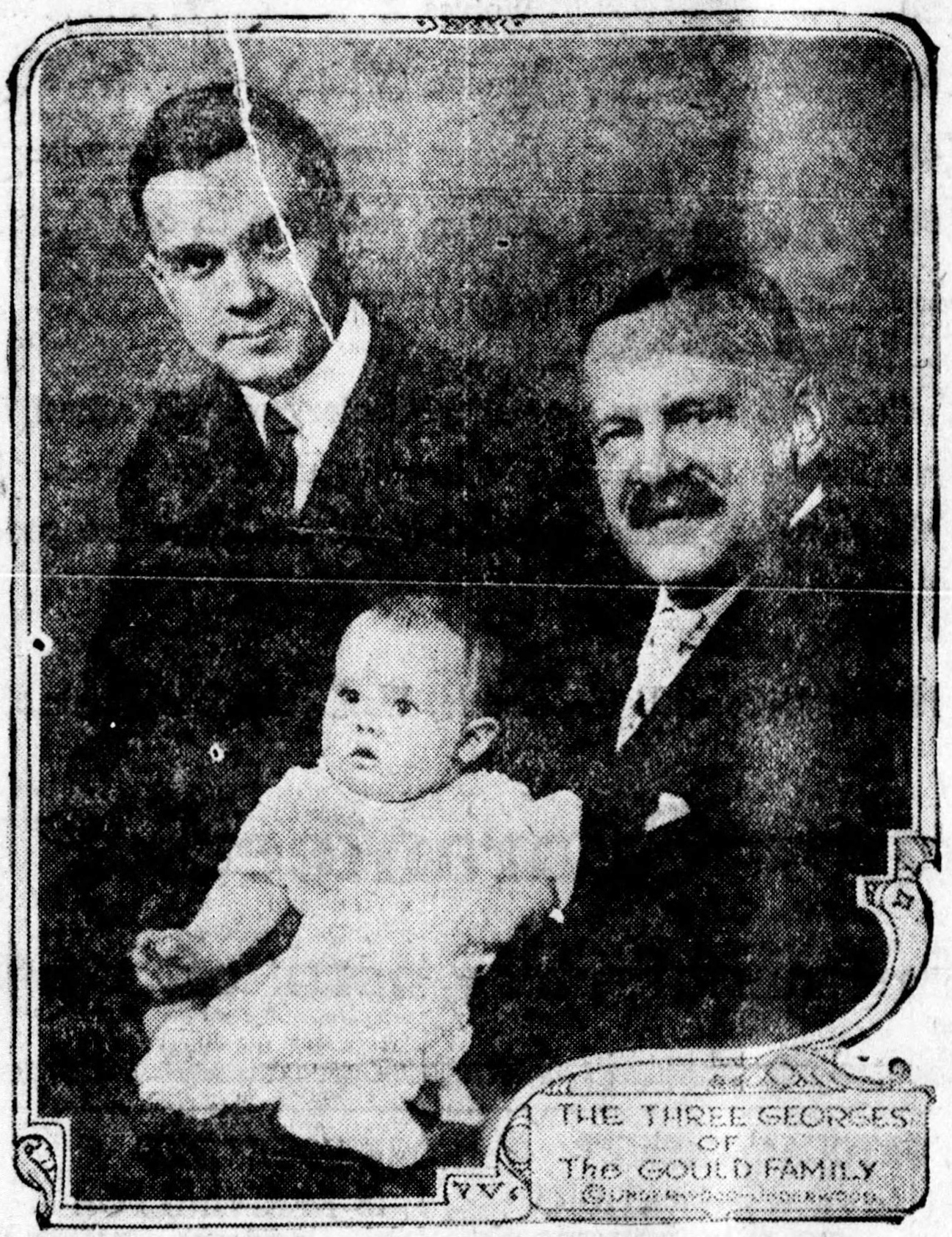
George, with his father and son, 1919

On July 5, 1917, a few days after his brother Kingdon married, Gould was married to Laura Marguerite Carter of Ardena, New Jersey, to the disapproval of his parents. She was the niece of Maughan Carter. Before their divorce in Nice, France in 1923, they were the parents of two sons:

- George Jay Gould III (1918–1985), who married Eileen O'Malley (1919–1996), the daughter of Leonard O'Malley, in 1942.
- Maughan Carter Gould (1920–1986), who married Suzanne Florence "Sukie" Close (1920–1989) in 1940.

After their divorce, Laura married, and later divorced, English actor Roy Royston. In 1927, he married Marie Louise Jacqueline Vial (1896–1969) of Paris who had been born in Claveisolles in the Rhône department in eastern France. Together, they were the parents of two sons:

- Howard Jay Gould (1928–1998), who married in December 1951.
- Patrick Jay Gould (1934–2018), an ornithologist who received his Ph.D. from the University of Arizona.

Gould died on June 7, 1963, in Paris following an operation. His widow died in 1969.
