= Golf House =

Estate house in New Jersey, US

Coordinates: 40.0948°N 74.1820°W

Golf House is a former estate house that was constructed in the early 1900s by John D. Rockefeller in Lakewood Township in Ocean County, New Jersey, United States.

== Construction of the Rockefeller estate ==
John Rockefeller began acquiring property in Lakewood, New Jersey in March 1901. In early November 1903, he purchased 330 acres (1.3 km^{2}), including 98 acres (400,000 m^{2}) from the Ocean County Hunt and Country club which became the core of the Rockefeller Lakewood estate. The Club had held the first Professional Golf Association tournament on their grounds on January 1, 1898.

In March 1907, Rockefeller increased the wages given to workers at Golf House from $1.50 to $1.65 per day, as he was having difficulty obtaining enough workers to perform the improvements he had planned to the property, which included building as much as three miles (5 km) of new roads and planting 1,000 evergreen saplings around the golf course. Only residents of New Jersey were hired and all applicants required a reference from someone known by William Foerster, Rockefeller's superintendent. The prevailing wage for laborers in the area had been $1.50 per day, and The New York Times described that the 10% wage increase Rockefeller offered would put pressure on other area employers, such as George Jay Gould I, to match the higher amount.

Rockefeller's summer retreat was 30-room, 20-bathroom, three-story mansion wrapped with glass-enclosed porches. The estate included a dairy, sheepfold, woodland, and a 9-hole golf course. Rockefeller and his household would spend spring and sometime parts of the summer at Lakewood.

== Sale to Ocean County ==
Rockefeller Sr. had lived in the Golf House estate during the spring and fall until he died in 1937. In 1925, the property was sold to John D. Rockefeller Jr., with his father leasing the property thereafter. It was reported that Rockefeller Jr. had paid $3,068,000 for the property. As of May 1938, The New York Times reported that the house had been on the market for more than a year at a price of $250,000 but that there were no serious offers despite many visits from prospective buyers. In 1934, the property's value was estimated at $1 million.

When John Rockefeller died in 1937, his son John D. Rockefeller Jr. discussed putting the estate up for sale. Unable to find a buyer after a few years, John Jr. discussed with the Board of Chosen Freeholders of Ocean County the possibility of the county taking over the property. On April 17, 1940 the Board of Freeholders formally accepted the property and the park opened on August 27, 1940. The Freeholders approved the acceptance of the gift despite opposition from the Lakewood Taxpayers Association, which complained that the township would lose $150,000 in property taxes by taking the property off of the tax rolls. The gift included the 26-room house and its furnishings, a number of accompanying buildings, flower gardens and a nine-hole golf course.

== Ocean County Park ==
The property is now Ocean County Park, a 323 acres (131 ha) in Lakewood Township, administered by the Ocean County Department of Parks & Recreation. The white pine, hemlock and other evergreen trees imported from around the country and planted a century before have matured. The park offers facilities including a disc golf course, tennis courts, sports fields, hiking trails, beach volleyball and a driving range, all free of charge. During the summer, playgrounds and a swimming lake are available. During the winter, the site can be used for cross-country skiing.

The house itself was used for various purposes after the park was established, but the building was eventually razed by the county in 1966. All that remains to mark the spot of the main house today is the flag pole and a marker. The carriage house, greatly enlarged, is now home to the Ocean County Police Academy, while the Ocean County Fire Marshal's Office occupies the superintendent's house. However, little of historical significance remains of these auxiliary buildings.

During WWII, the New York Giants held spring training on the park's two ball fields.
