= Tallmadge Township =

Tallmadge Township may refer to:

- Tallmadge Township, Ottawa County, Michigan (Tallmadge Charter Township, Michigan)
- Tallmadge Township, Summit County, Ohio, former name of the city of Tallmadge

See also

- Tallmadge (disambiguation)
