= Baroness Decies =

Baroness Decies may refer to:

- Helen Beresford, Baroness Decies (1893–1936), née Gould, socialite and philanthropist, first wife of John Beresford, 5th Baron Decies
- Elizabeth Wharton Drexel (1868–1944), author and Manhattan socialite, second wife of John Beresford, 5th Baron Decies
