= Talmage =

Talmage may refer to:

== People ==
Given name

- Tal Bachman (born 1968), Canadian singer-songwriter
- Talmage Cooley (born 1965), American social entrepreneur and filmmaker
- Tal Farlow (1921–1998), American jazz guitarist

Surname

- A. A. Talmage (1834–1887), American railroad executive
- Algernon Talmage (1871–1939), British artist
- David Talmage (1919–2014), American immunologist
- James E. Talmage (1862–1933), American Mormon apostle, author, and academic
- John Van Nest Talmage (1819–1892), American Protestant missionary in China
- May Booth Talmage (1868–1944), American Mormon missionary in Europe
- Thomas De Witt Talmage (1832–1902), American preacher and writer

== Places ==
United States

- Talmage, California
- Talmage, Kansas
- Talmage, Kentucky
- Talmage, Missouri
- Talmage City, Missouri
- Talmage, Nebraska
- Talmage, Pennsylvania
- Talmage, Utah

== See also ==
- Tallmadge (disambiguation)
- Talmadge (disambiguation)
- Talmadge (surname)
- Tal Bachman
