= Edith Catherine Gould =

American heiress and author

Edith, Lady MacNeal
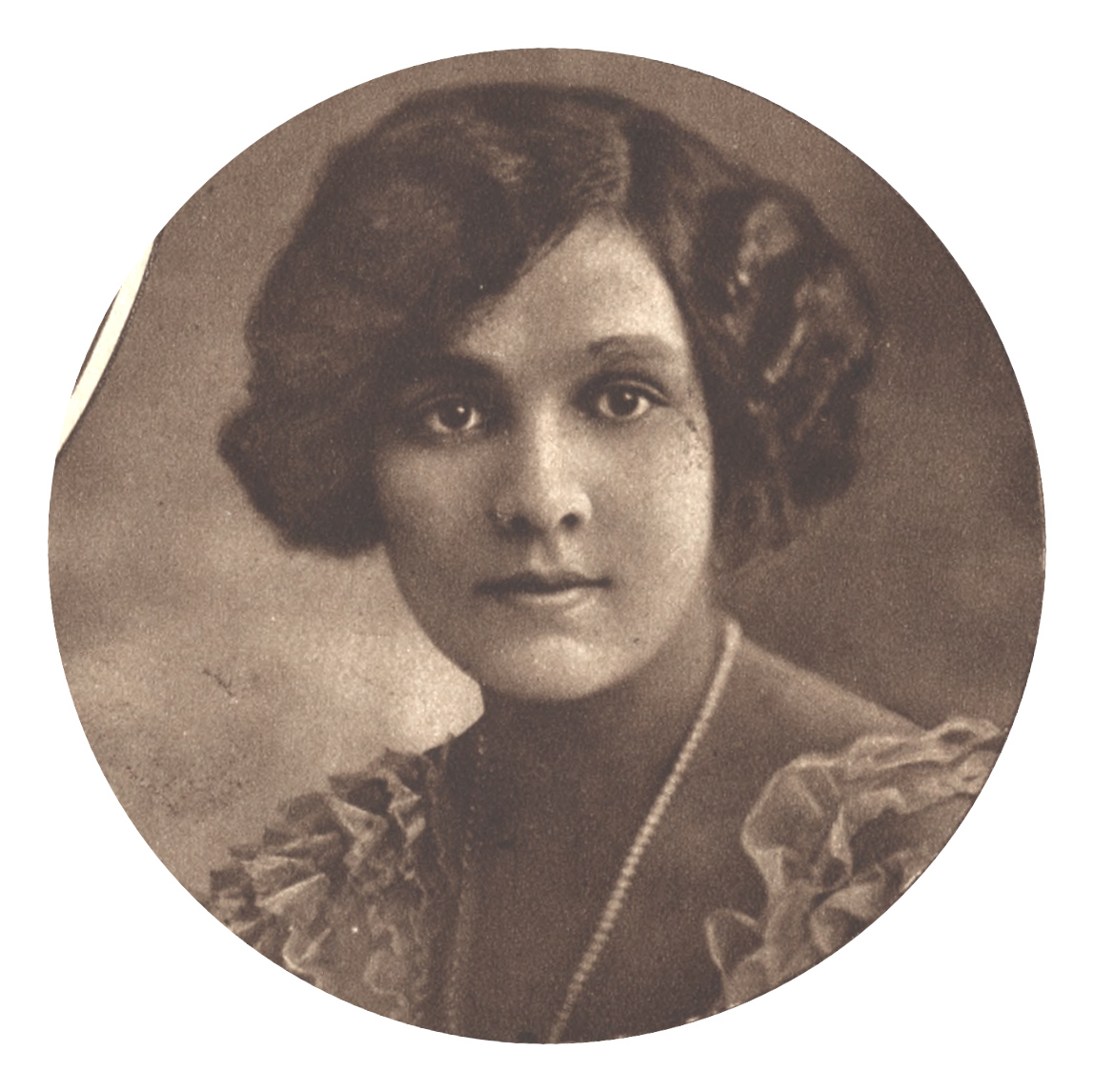
- Born: Edith Catherine Gould; August 3, 1901; Cold Spring Harbor, New York, US
- Died: September 10, 1937 (aged 36); East Hampton, New York, US
- Education: Miss Spence's School
- Spouses: Carroll Livingston Wainwright (m. 1920; div. 1932) Sir Hector MacNeal (m. 1932)
- Children: Stuyvesant Wainwright II; Caroline DePeyster Wainwright; Carroll L. Wainwright Jr.
- Parent(s): George Jay Gould I Edith Kingdon
- Relatives: Jay Gould (grandfather)

Edith Catherine MacNeal (née Gould, formerly Wainwright) (August 3, 1901 – September 10, 1937) was an American heiress and writer.

== Early life ==
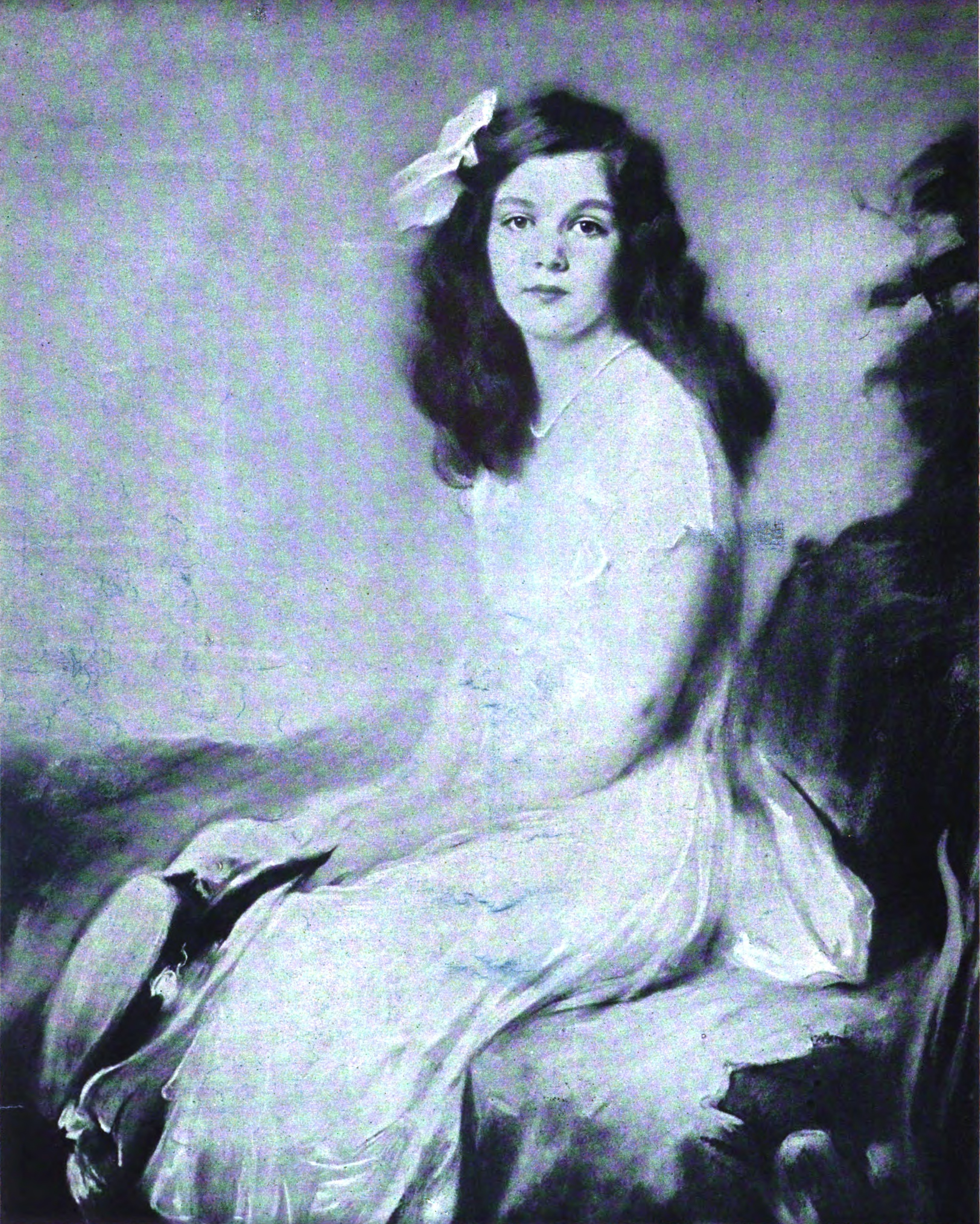
Portrait of Miss Edith Gould, by Artúr Lajos Halmi, c. 1914

Edith was born aboard her father's yacht, Sybarite, on August 3, 1901, while it was anchored off Cold Spring Harbor and was flying the British flag. She was one of seven children born to millionaire George Jay Gould I (1864–1923) and actress Edith Kingdon Gould (1864–1921). Among her siblings were Kingdon Gould Sr., Jay Gould II, Marjorie Gwynne Gould (wife of Anthony Joseph Drexel III), Helen Vivien Gould (wife of John Beresford, 5th Baron Decies), George Jay Gould II, and Gloria Gould (wife of Henry A. Bishop II and Wallace McFarlane Barker).

Her father was the eldest son of the former Helen Day Miller and Jay Gould, a leading American railroad developer and speculator who has been referred to as one of the ruthless robber barons of the Gilded Age, whose success at business made him one of the richest men of his era. Her aunt, Anna Gould, was married to two European aristocrats, Boni de Castellane (the elder son and heir apparent of the Marquis of Castellane) and Hélie de Talleyrand-Périgord, Duke of Sagan (Boni's cousin).

She attended Miss Spence's School in Manhattan.

== Career ==
In 1925, Edith wrote her autobiography, "in which she told at length how it felt to be the granddaughter of a millionaire. She told the 'inner secrets' of the Gould family as she knew them when a child."

== Personal life ==
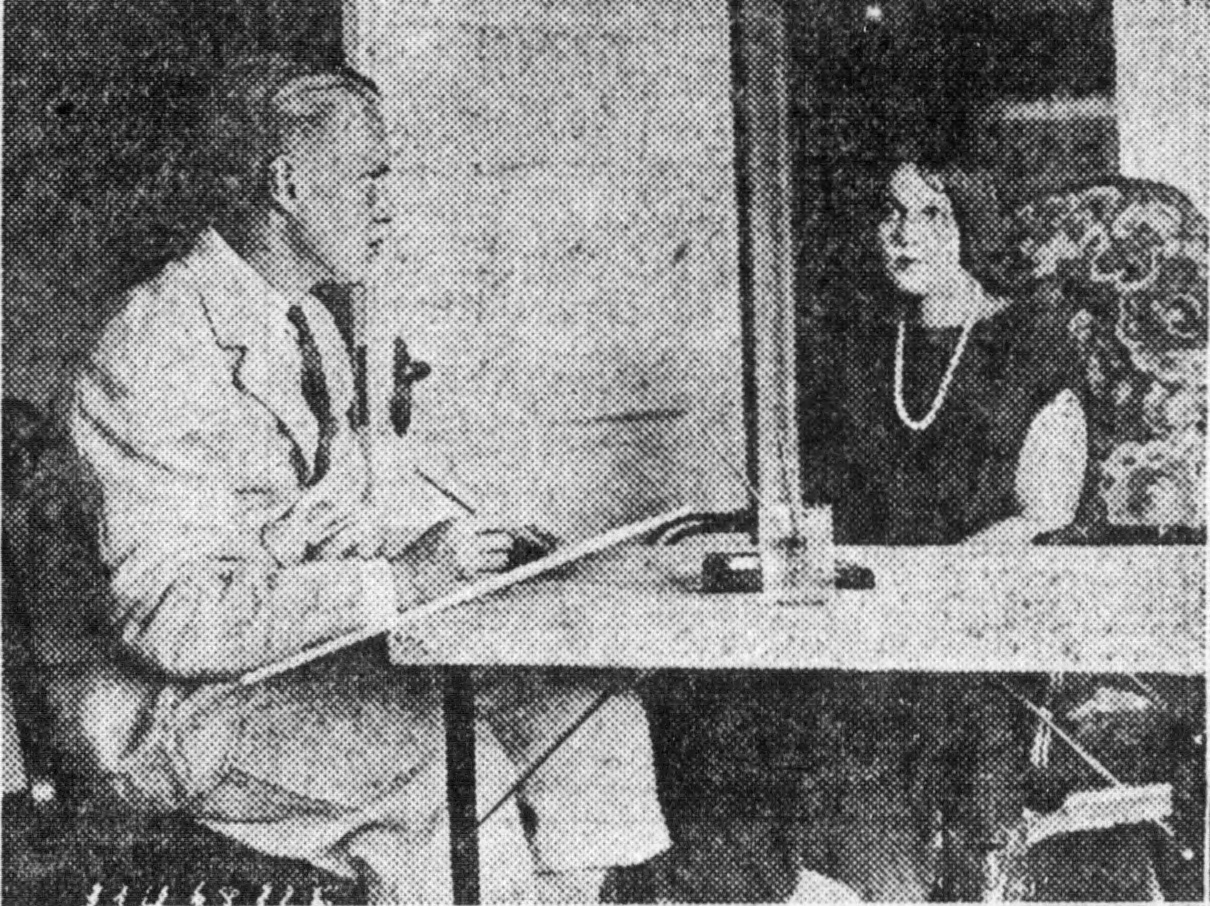
Carroll Livingston Wainwright and Edith Gould Wainwright, on the porch of their summer home at Ventnor, New Jersey, 1923

On May 27, 1920, 18 year-old Gould obtained a marriage license a few hours after graduating from Miss Spence's and married artist Carroll Livingston Wainwright, a son of Stuyvesant Wainwright and Caroline Smith (née Snowden) Wainwright. He was a nephew of four star General Jonathan Mayhew Wainwright, who was the hero of Bataan and commander of the U.S. forces in the Philippines during World War II. Through his brother, Loudon, he was the uncle of Loudon Wainwright Jr., and the grand-uncle of Loudon Wainwright III, the singer and songwriter, himself the father of Rufus Wainwright, Martha Wainwright, and Lucy Wainwright Roche. Before their divorce in 1932, they were the parents of three children:

- Stuyvesant Wainwright II (1921–2010), who represented New York's 1st District in the U.S. House of Representatives from 1953 to 1961.
- Caroline DePeyster Wainwright (1924–1969), who married Edward T. Shean, an investment banker, in 1945. They divorced in 1963.
- Carroll Livingston Wainwright Jr. (1925–2016), who married Nina Walker in 1948.

In 1927, the family moved to East Hampton, New York where they built an imposing house called "Gulf Crest," that was valued at $350,000 in 1937.

In February 1931, her husband was committed to the Bloomingdale Hospital at White Plains by his brothers. In their suit, they claimed he had been subject to hallucinations since 1916, when he had pneumonia and an appendicitis operation. They claimed he had suffered breakdowns in 1916, 1923 and 1929 because of overwork and the strenuous demands of society. Three months later, he was released and shortly thereafter in January 1932, Edith obtained a divorce from Wainwright in Reno, Nevada. There was no property settlement. Immediately after their divorce, she married widower Sir Hector MacNeal, the Scottish shipowner.

Lady MacNeal died in East Hampton on September 10, 1937. Her first husband died there in 1967.
