= Talmadge =

Talmadge may refer to:

- Talmadge, Maine, a town in the U.S. state of Maine
- Talmadge, California, variant name of Talmage, California
- Talmadge, San Diego, California, a neighborhood of San Diego California, U.S.
- Talmadge Memorial Bridge, a cable-stayed bridge in Savannah, Georgia, U.S.
- The Talmadge, historic building in Los Angeles, California, U.S.
- Talmadge (surname), people with the surname Talmadge

== See also ==
- Tallmadge (disambiguation)
- Talmage (disambiguation)
