= Kingdon Gould =

Kingdon Gould may refer to:

- Kingdon Gould Sr. (1887–1945), financier and polo player
- Kingdon Gould Jr. (1924–2018), former ambassador, businessman, and philanthropist
- Kingdon Gould III (born 1948), American real estate developer
