= Talmadge (surname) =

Talmadge is a surname. Notable people with the surname include:

- Betty Talmadge (1923–2005), American political hostess, businesswoman, writer, and socialite
- Constance Talmadge (1898–1973), American actress, sister of Norma and Natalie
- Eugene Talmadge (1884–1946), American politician
- Herman Talmadge (1913–2002), American politician, son of Eugene
- Madeleine Talmadge Force (1893–1940), Titanic survivor, widow of Col. John Jacob Astor IV
- May Erwin Talmadge (1885–1973), American civic leader
- Natalie Talmadge (1896–1969), American actress
- Norma Talmadge (1894–1957), American actress
- Phil Talmadge (born c. 1952), Washington State Supreme Court justice
- Richard Talmadge (1892–1981), American actor, stuntman and film director

== See also ==
- Talmadge Hayer (born 1941), convicted assassin of Malcolm X
- Tallmadge (disambiguation)
- Talmage (disambiguation)
