= Helen Avis Drexel =

American silent-film actress and heiress

- Born: Helen Avis Howard; November 19, 1911; Atlanta, Georgia, United States
- Died: November 20, 1974 (aged 63); Savannah, Georgia, United States

Helen Avis Drexel (November 19, 1911 – November 20, 1974) was an American silent-film actress and heiress. She rose to prominence through her appearance in the John Berendt non-fictional novel Midnight in the Garden of Good and Evil (1994), in which she was a composite character named Serena Dawes.

== Life and career ==
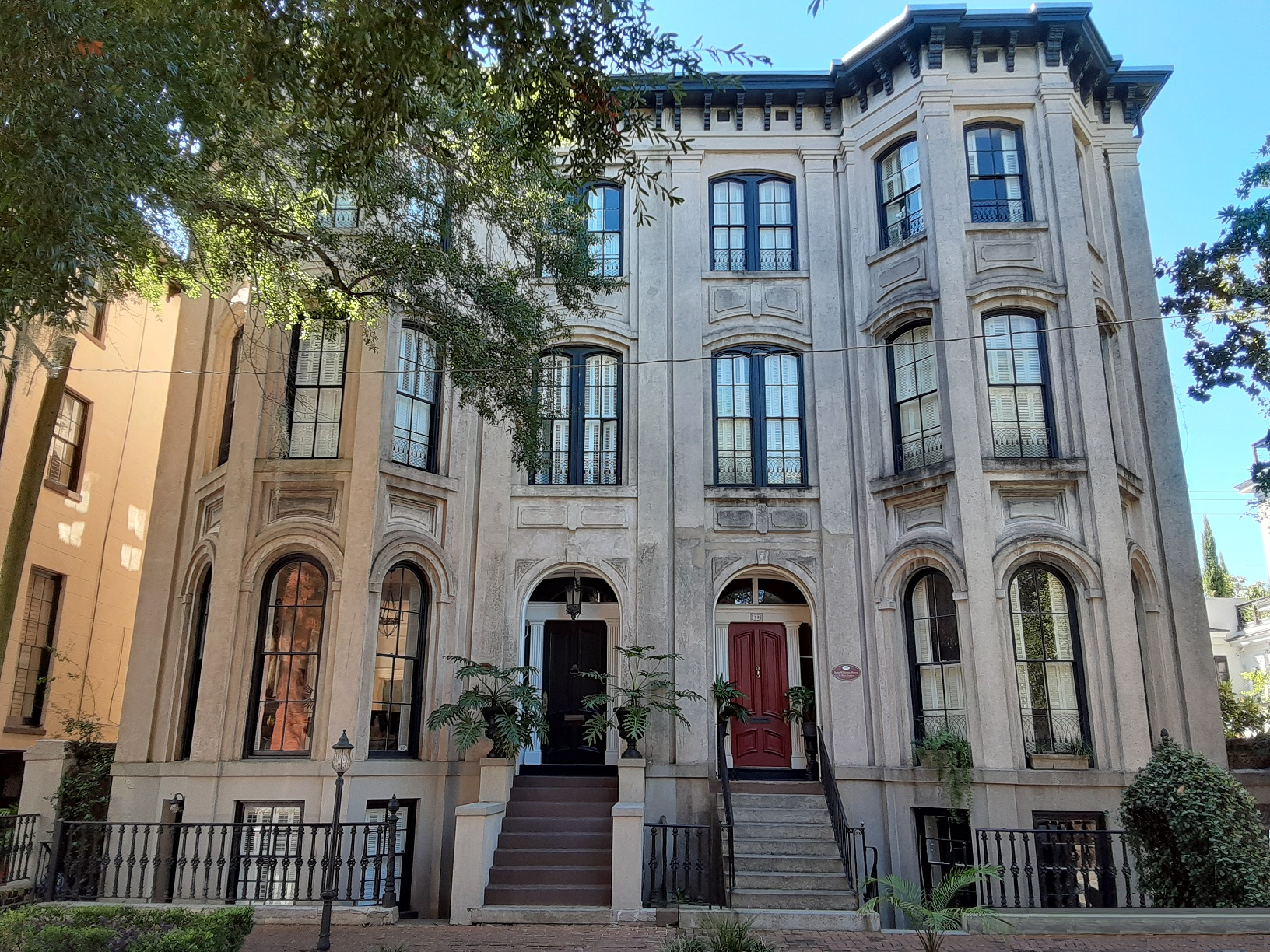
Drexel lived at 17 West Gordon Street in Savannah's Monterey Square

Helen Avis Howard was born on November 19, 1911, in Atlanta, Georgia, the only child of Clinton Chappell Howard and Belle Allen Barber.

She attended Washington Seminary in Atlanta and the Finch School in New York City.

On August 19, 1933, Howard married Anthony Joseph Drexel III, son of Anthony Joseph Drexel II, whom she met in Nassau, Bahamas. He died on January 14, 1948, at his Wappaoola Plantation, in Charleston, South Carolina, after a souvenir pistol accidentally discharged and struck an artery in his right shoulder. He was 34. The couple had three children: Anthony J. Drexel IV (1934–2020), Clinton Howard Drexel and Helen Diana Drexel. Anthony IV went on to become a major in the United States Air Force. He gave his sister away in her marriage to Gerald Raibourn in 1961. Their brother was an usher. Anthony IV died in 2020, aged 85.

In 1964, Drexel moved to Savannah, where she spent the rest of her life. She was often seen having a drink at The Olde Pink House, and lived at 17 West Gordon Street in Monterey Square, adjacent to Jim Williams' Mercer House.

Cecil Beaton called Drexel "one of the most perfect natural beauties I've ever photographed."

=== Midnight in the Garden of Good and Evil ===
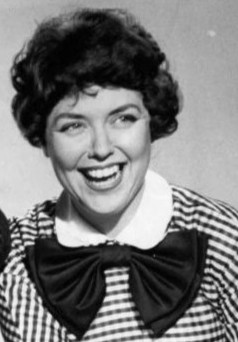
Dorothy Loudon portrayed Serena Dawes in the 1997 film adaptation of Midnight in the Garden of Good and Evil

In 1994, John Berendt included a composite version of Drexel, whom he named Serena Dawes, in his cast of characters in his bestselling non-fiction novel Midnight in the Garden of Good and Evil. Berendt's interactions with her were fictitious, however, as she died over a decade before he moved to Savannah. Dorothy Loudon portrayed her in Clint Eastwood's 1997 film adaptation. (Prentiss Crowe's lines about Danny Hansford being "a good time not yet had by all" were instead spoken by Dawes in the film.)

=== Death ===
Drexel died on November 20, 1974, aged 63. She is buried beside her husband in Bluffton Cemetery, Bluffton, South Carolina.
