= Edith Kingdon =

American actress (1864–1921)

Edith Mary Kingdon Gould
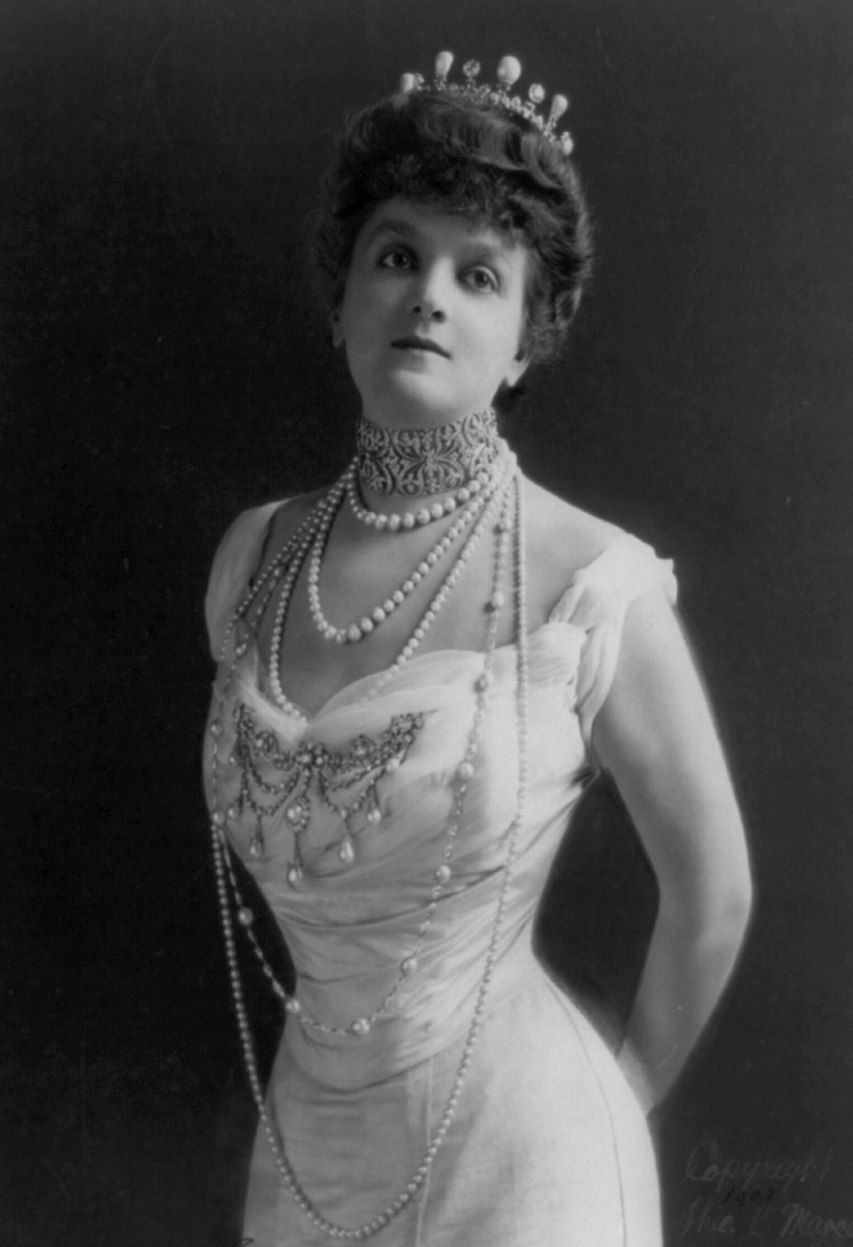
- Kingdon in 1903
- Born: Edith Mary Kingdon; August 23, 1864; Brooklyn, New York, US
- Died: November 13, 1921 (aged 57); Georgian Court, Lakewood Township, New Jersey
- Spouse: George Jay Gould (m. 1885)
- Children: 7, including Helen Vivien, Kingdon, Jay II and Gloria Gould

Edith Mary Kingdon Gould (August 24, 1864 – November 13, 1921) was an American actress. She married George Jay Gould, American railroad developer and speculator known as one of the ruthless robber barons of the Gilded Age.

== Early life ==
She was born in 1864 in Brooklyn, New York, and educated in England. She was the daughter of Charles Dennis Kingdon and Mary Carter of Toronto, Ontario.

== Career ==
She worked as a stage actress until her marriage to George Jay Gould I. In 1908, she returned to acting, appearing in a one-act play opposite Frederick Townsend Martin. The play, Mrs. Van Vechten's Divorce Dance, was performed in the ballroom of the Plaza Hotel. Her performance was attended by Commodore Elbridge Thomas Gerry and his wife, Louisa Livingston Gerry, Mrs. Vanderbilt, Gladys Vanderbilt, Count Széchenyi, Ellen French Vanderbilt (wife of Alfred G. Vanderbilt), Mrs. Emily Vanderbilt Sloane, Marion Anthon Fish (wife of Stuyvesant Fish), Ruth Livingston Mills (wife of Ogden Mills), Anne Harriman Vanderbilt (wife of William Kissam Vanderbilt), and many others prominent in New York society.

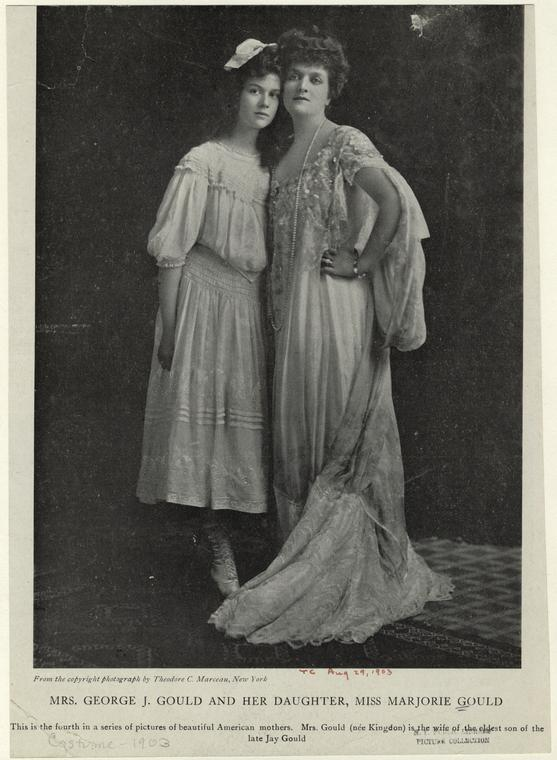
Daughter Marjorie Gould and her mother Edith Kingdon Gould in 1903, photo by Theodore C. Marceau

Edith and George hired Bruce Price, to build their home, which they called Georgian Court. The site is now Georgian Court University.

== Personal life ==
She married George Jay Gould I (1864–1923), a financier and railroad executive who led both the Denver and Rio Grande Western Railroad and the Western Pacific Railroad. Gould was the son of Jay Gould, who is considered one of the ruthless robber barons of the Gilded Age. Together, George and Edith had the following children:

- Kingdon Gould, Sr. (1887–1945), who married Annunziata Camilla Maria Lucci (1890–1961).
- Jay Gould II (1888–1935), a tennis player who married Anne Douglass Graham, a descendant of Hawaiian royalty.
- Marjorie Gwynne Gould (1891–1955), who married Anthony Joseph Drexel III (1887–1946), the son of Anthony Joseph Drexel, Jr. and grandson of Anthony Joseph Drexel.
- Helen Vivien Gould (1893–1931) who married John Beresford, 5th Baron Decies (1866–1945).
- George Jay Gould II (1896-1963) who married, and later divorced, Laura Carter.
- Edith Catherine Gould (1901–1937) who married Carroll Livingston Wainwright I (1899–1967). They divorced and she married Sir Hector Murray MacNeal.
- Gloria Gould (1906–1943) who married Henry A. Bishop II, and after a divorce married Walter McFarlane Barker.

She died on November 13, 1921, at the golf course of their home at Georgian Court in Lakewood Township, New Jersey. After a private funeral at the Gould home, she was buried at Woodlawn Cemetery, Bronx, in the Jay Gould Mausoleum.

=== Descendants ===
Through her daughter Edith, she was the grandmother of Stuyvesant Wainwright (1921–2010), a Member of the U.S. House of Representatives.

Through her daughter Helen, she was the grandmother of Arthur Beresford, 6th Baron Decies (1915–1992).
