= Edith Kingdon Gould =

American socialite, linguist and poet

Edith Kingdon Gould Martin (August 20, 1920 – August 17, 2004) was an American socialite, linguist, actress, and poet.

== Birth ==
She was the daughter of financier Kingdon Gould Sr., granddaughter of financier George Jay Gould, and great-granddaughter of Jay Gould the robber baron. She was an actress in the 1946 Broadway production of Agatha Christie's play Hidden Horizon.

== Navy ==
In October 1942 Gould joined the WAVES as an apprentice seaman. She trained in Madison, Wisconsin. She graduated as an ensign from the Naval Reserve Midshipmen's School in Northampton, Massachusetts, in April 1944. She was eventually promoted to lieutenant. She spoke five languages.

== Marriage and children ==
She married Isaiah Guyman "Guy" Martin Jr. (1911-2014) when he was age 35. He was a Navy lieutenant and a lawyer in Judge Advocate General's Corps. They married in Manhattan in October 1946. They had four children: Isaiah Guyman Martin III, Jason Gould Martin, Christopher Kingdon Martin, and Edith Maria Theodosia Burr Martin.

== Death ==
She died on August 17, 2004, in the Catskills.
