= Tallmadge =

Tallmadge may refer to:

== People ==
- John Tallmadge, American nature writer
- Benjamin Tallmadge (1754–1835), American soldier and politician; US Representative from Connecticut
- Nathaniel P. Tallmadge (1795–1864), United States Senator from New York
- James Tallmadge Jr. (1778–1853), United States Representative from New York
- Frederick A. Tallmadge (1792–1869), American politician, US Representative from New York
- Matthias B. Tallmadge (1774–1819), American politician, lawyer, and judge in New York state
- Thomas Tallmadge (1876–1940), American architect

== Places ==
- Tallmadge Township, Michigan
- Tallmadge, Ohio

== Other ==
- Tallmadge Amendment

== See also ==
- Talmage (disambiguation)
- Talmadge (disambiguation)
