= George Jay Gould =

American railroad executive (1864–1923)

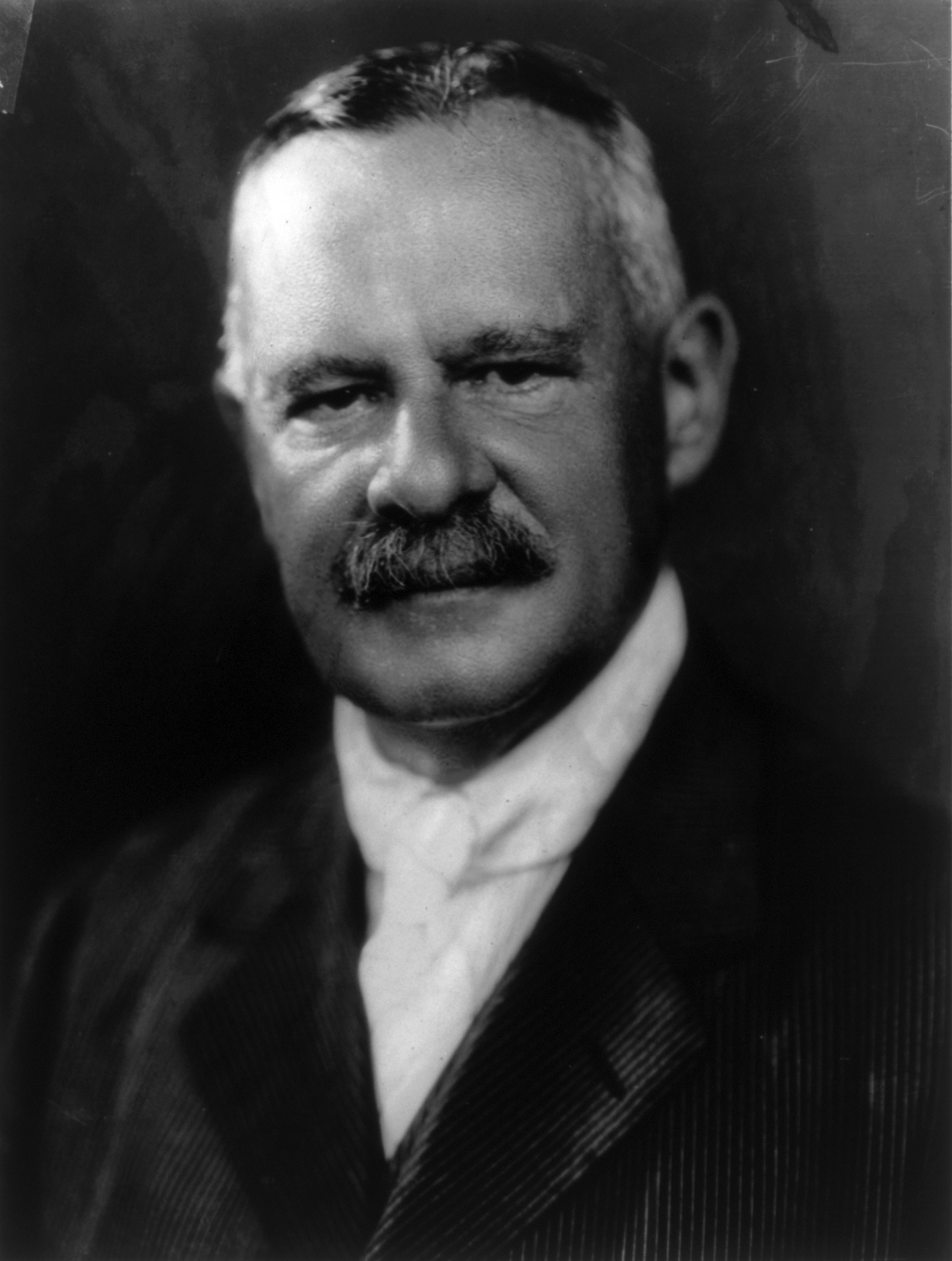
- Born: February 6, 1864
- Died: May 16, 1923 (aged 59); French Riviera
- Spouses: Edith Kingdon (m. 1885; died 1921) Guinevere Jeanne Sinclair (m. 1922)
- Children: 10, including Helen Vivien, Kingdon, Jay II and Gloria Gould
- Parent(s): Jay Gould; Helen Day Miller
- Relatives: Siblings: Edwin Gould Sr.; Helen Gould; Howard Gould; Anna Gould; Frank Jay Gould

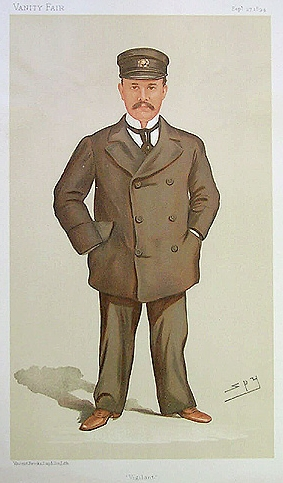
"Vigilant" Gould as depicted in Vanity Fair, September 1894. Gould had bought Vigilant, the winner of the previous year's America's Cup, and was racing it in England.

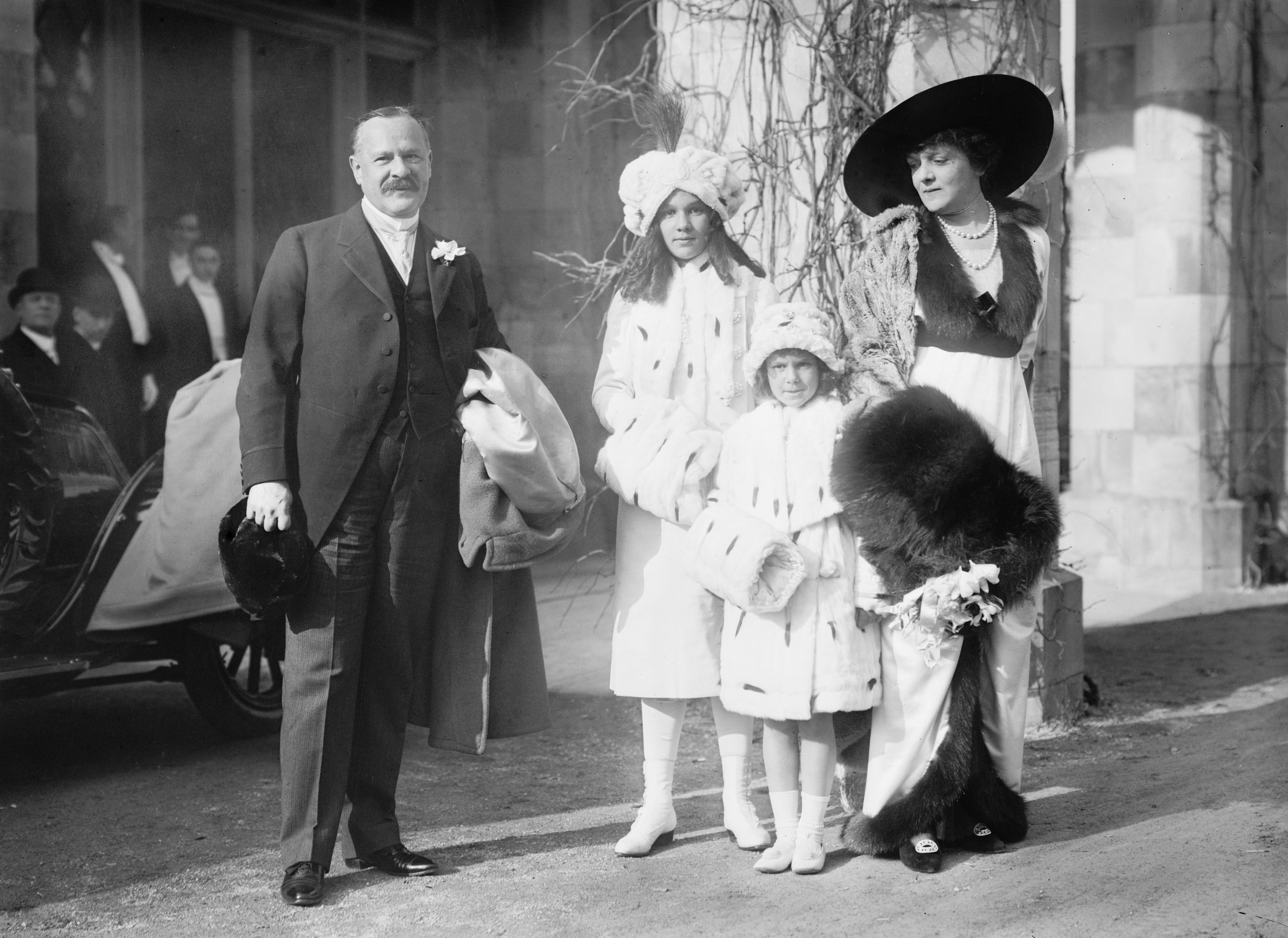
Gould and his family at the wedding of his sister, Helen Miller Shepard in 1913

George Jay Gould I (February 6, 1864 – May 16, 1923) was a financier and the son of Jay Gould. He was himself a railroad executive, leading the Denver and Rio Grande Western Railroad (DRGW), Western Pacific Railroad (WP), and the Manhattan Railway Company.

== Early life ==
Gould was born on February 6, 1864, the eldest son of Jay Gould (1836–1892) and Helen Day Miller (1838–1889). His father was a leading American railroad developer and speculator who has been described as one of the ruthless robber barons of the Gilded Age, whose success at business made him one of the richest men of his era.

== Railroad management ==
Upon his father's death George inherited a portion of the Gould fortune (Jay Gould left $15 million to George and $10 million to each of his other 5 children) and his father's railroad holdings, including the DRGW and the Missouri Pacific Railroad. While in charge of the DRGW at the turn of the 20th century, he sent surveyors and engineers through California's Feather River canyon to stake out a route for the railroad to reach San Francisco, California. Through legal wranglings led by E. H. Harriman, who at the time led both the Union Pacific and Southern Pacific Railroads, Gould was forced to set up third-party companies to manage the surveying and construction to disguise his role. The route that Gould's engineers built became the WP mainline.

In later years, the DRGW and WP would work together on trains that were passed off to each other in Salt Lake City, Utah, including the prestigious passenger train, the California Zephyr.

== Personal life ==
He married Edith Mary Kingdon (1864–1921), a stage actress (a marriage of which his mother strongly disapproved) and had the following children:

- Kingdon Gould, Sr. (1887–1945) who married Annunziata Camilla Maria Lucci (1890–1961).
- Jay Gould II (1888–1935) who was a tennis player and who married Anne Douglass Graham, a descendant of Hawaiian royalty.
- Marjorie Gwynne Gould (1891–1955) who married Anthony Joseph Drexel III, grandson of Anthony Joseph Drexel through Anthony Joseph Drexel, Jr.
- Helen Vivien Gould (1893–1931) who married John Graham Hope DeLaPoer Horsley Beresford, 5th Baron Decies (1866–1945).
- George Jay Gould II (1896-1963) who married Laura Carter.
- Edith Catherine Gould (1901–1937) who married Carroll Livingston Wainwright I (1899–1967; their son was Stuyvesant Wainwright) and after a divorce married Sir Hector Murray MacNeal.
- Gloria Gould (1906–1943) who married Henry A. Bishop II, and after a divorce married Wallace McFarlane Barker.

Gould also had a mistress, Guinevere Jeanne Sinclair (1885–1978), and had the following children with her:

- George Sinclair Gould (1915–2003) later changed his name to Brodrick (his stepfather's name).
- Jane Sinclair Gould (1916–1948)
- Guinevere Gould (1922–1968)

After the death of his first wife in 1921, Gould married Sinclair on May 1, 1922. Then with the three children in tow, they moved to England.

=== Death and burial ===
He died of pneumonia on May 16, 1923, on the French Riviera after contracting a fever in Egypt where he visited the tomb of Tutankhamun. He was buried in Woodlawn Cemetery in New York. His estate was valued at $15,054,627 but after debts were paid it was worth $5,175,590 in 1933 dollars.

=== Legacy ===
Gould's estate in Lakewood Township, New Jersey, is now the site of Georgian Court University.

== See also ==
- Curse of the Pharaohs
