= Anthony Joseph Drexel III =

American banker and aviator (1887–1946)

A.J. Drexel
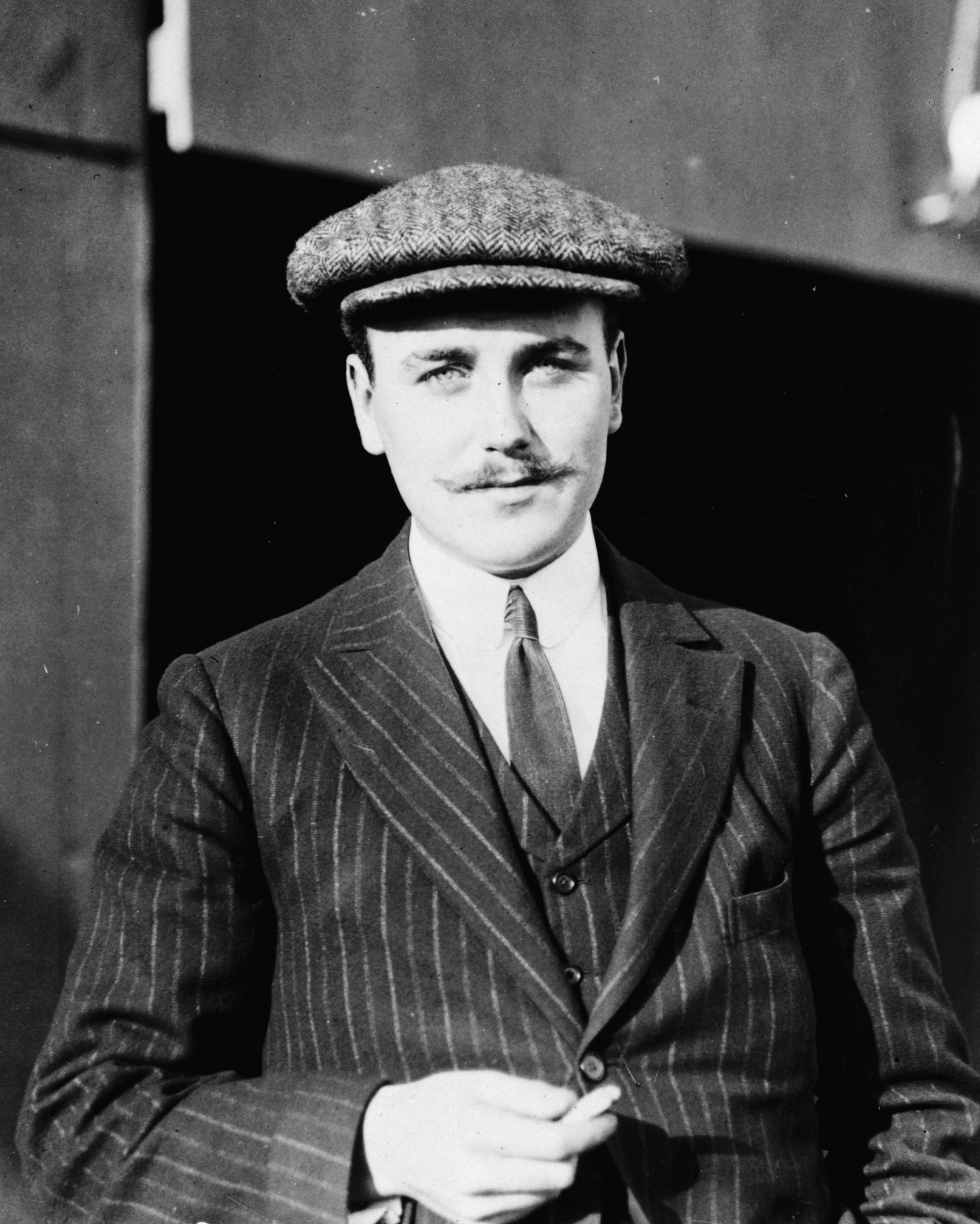
- Photograph of Drexel, c. 1911
- Born: Anthony Joseph Drexel III; October 19, 1887; Philadelphia, Pennsylvania, U.S.
- Died: March 23, 1946 (aged 58); Boca Grande, Florida, U.S.
- Education: Eton College
- Occupation: Banker
- Spouse: Marjorie Gwynne Gould (m. 1910)
- Children: 3
- Parent(s): Anthony Joseph Drexel Jr. Margarita Armstrong
- Relatives: Margaretta Finch-Hatton, Countess of Winchilsea (sister); John Armstrong Drexel (brother); Anthony Joseph Drexel (grandfather)

Anthony Joseph Drexel III (October 19, 1887 – February 23, 1946) was an American banker and aviator.

== Early life ==
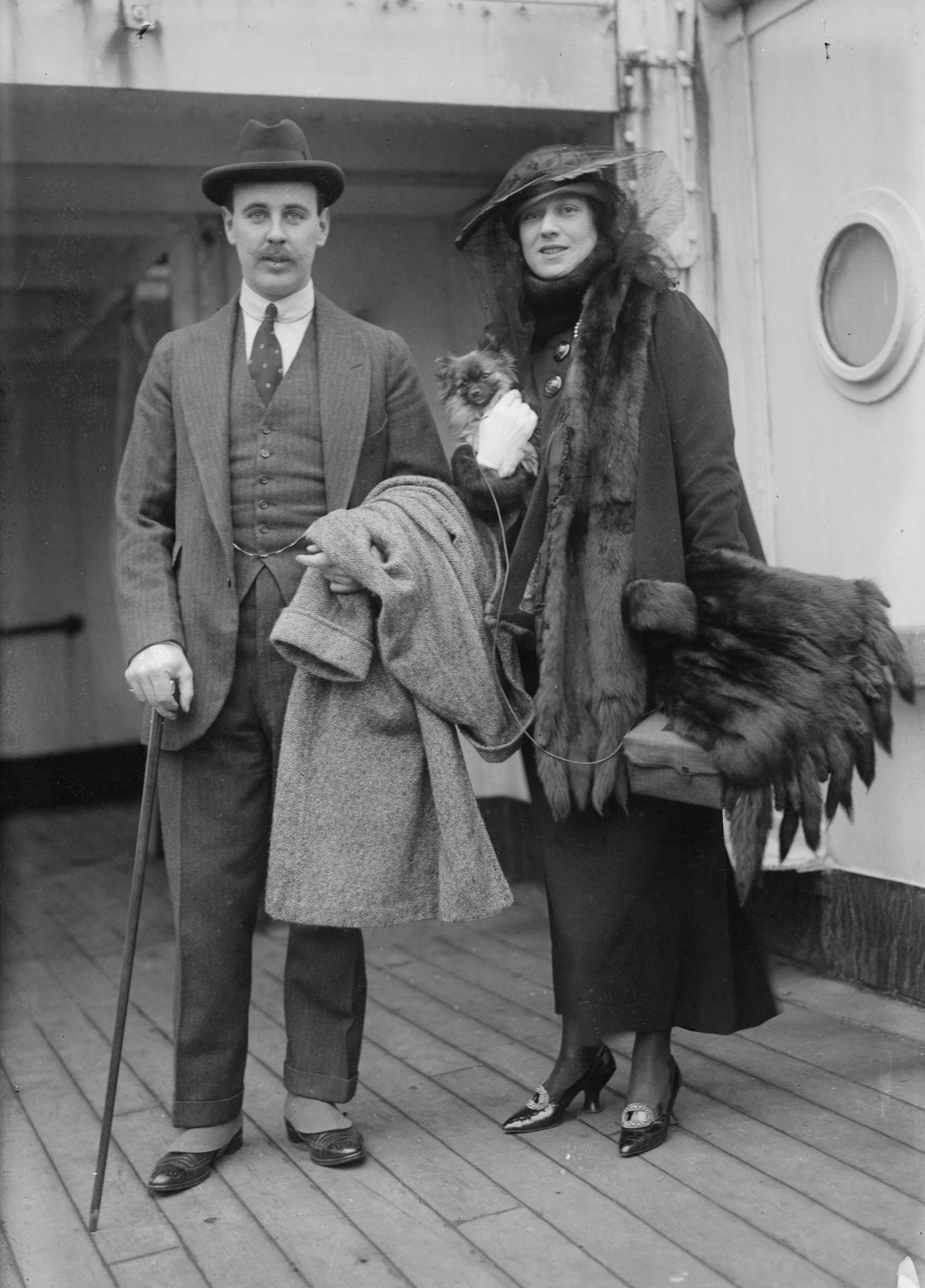
Photograph of Drexel and his wife, Marjorie, 1916

He was the eldest son of Margarita "Rita" Armstrong (1867–1948), Anthony Joseph Drexel Jr. Among his siblings were Margaretta (the wife of Guy Finch-Hatton, 14th Earl of Winchilsea); aviation pioneer John Armstrong Drexel; and Louis Clapier Norris Drexel. His parents divorced in 1917, and his mother married Brinsley FitzGerald (the son of Peter FitzGerald, 1st Baronet of Valencia) in 1918.

His paternal grandparents were Anthony Joseph Drexel (son of Austrian-born American banker Francis Martin Drexel) and Ellen (née Rozet) Drexel. Through his sister Margaretta, he was uncle to Christopher Finch-Hatton, 15th Earl of Winchilsea. His maternal grandfather John Armstrong of the Baltimore Armstrongs.

At the age of nine, his parents took him to England where he was educated at Farnborough and Eton College, which he attended for three and a half years. His father was a close friend of both King Edward VII and Kaiser Wilhelm II. At age 16, he began a world tour that lasted a year and a half.

== Career ==
After his world tour, Drexel returned to Philadelphia and began working as a clerk for Drexel & Co., the family firm founded by his great-grandfather Francis in 1838. His grandfather expanded the family fortunes by partnering with J. Pierpont Morgan to form Drexel, Morgan & Co. of New York in 1871 and Drexel, Harjes & Co. of Paris.

In 1910, he was operating a flying school at Beaulieu, a quaint little village on the verge of the New Forest in England. After his marriage, he returned again to the U.S. and became a "widely publicized messenger boy for a New York brokerage firm, E. and C. Randolph." He later became a clerk of the firm before becoming a partner in the firm J. R. Williston & Co. for two years. He bought a seat on the New York Stock Exchange and founded his own brokerage firm, Liggett, Drexel & Co. with fellow New York clubman John E. Liggett (of the Liggett tobacco family), at 61 Broadway in Manhattan. In 1917, his brother-in-law George Jay Gould Jr. joined the firm. In 1918, he sold his seat to his partner for $55,000. In 1919, the Intermountain Railway, Light & Power Co. sued Liggett & Drexel's successor, Liggett, Hichborn & Co., for $286,000 seeking damages related to a failed bond issue. In 1921, the Merchants Trust Company of Waterbury, Connecticut sued Liggett for endorsing bankrupt notes. Liggett's wife later sued him as well, claiming she helped keep the Liggett & Drexel firm afloat by contributing her own cash, securities and jewelry.

During World War I, a member of Squadron A, Drexel served as a Lieutenant of the U.S. Army. After the War, he served as vice president of the Standard Film Industries Corporation in New York. In 1935, he was present at a New York State Legislative committee's hearing as an advocate of lotteries for charity.

=== Later life ===
After he retired from banking, he moved away from Philadelphia, splitting his time between his home in Boca Grande, Florida and his home in Shelter Island, an island at the eastern end of Long Island. In 1937, Drexel and his wife hosted a dinner in honor of Sir Bede Clifford, Governor of the Bahamas, and Lady Clifford (the former Alice Devin Gundry), at their home, Caprice. He was a member of the Philadelphia Club, Racquet Club and Corinthian Club in Philadelphia and the Knickerbocker Club, New York Yacht Club, and the Racquet and Tennis Clubs of New York.

In 1938, he sold his 238-ton steel yacht, Queen of Scots, to the British registry to be used as a hospital ship for the British Red Cross.

When World War II broke out, Drexel and his wife were at their home in suburban Paris, and were forced to flee to their villa in Biarritz, and then to Portugal, where the boarded a ship to America. Upon his return to the United States, he "devoted much of his time to sports, particularly yachting."

== Personal life ==
In 1910, Drexel was married to Marjorie Gwynne Gould (1891–1955), the eldest daughter of former actress Edith Kingdon and financier George Jay Gould. While in New York City, they resided at 1015 Fifth Avenue. They also owned a home in Lakewood, New Jersey and Caprice, a home in the Cable Beach community near Nassau, Bahamas. Together, they were the parents of:

- Edith Kingdon Drexel (1911–1934), who married Henry Sergeant Cram (1907–1997), son of John Sergeant Cram and Edith Claire Bryce, in 1931. After her early death, Cram married Ruth Vaux, a granddaughter of Richard Vaux.
- Anthony Joseph Drexel IV (1912–1948), who married Helen Avis Howard (1911–1974), a daughter of Dr. Clinton Chappell Howard who became a prominent character in the John Berendt non-fiction novel Midnight in the Garden of Good and Evil.
- Marjorie Gould Drexel (1916–1947), who married John Murton Gundry Jr. (1896–1961) in 1935. They divorced in 1945 and she married Axel Julius Danielson (1897–1961) in 1946.

In 1911, his sister-in-law, Vivien Gould, married John Beresford, 5th Baron Decies. Drexel's boxing match with the bridegroom's brother, Seton Beresford, "aroused considerable comment." Following Viven's death in 1931, Lord Decies married Drexel's elder cousin, Elizabeth Wharton Drexel, the daughter of Joseph William Drexel, and widow of both John Vinton Dahlgren and New York society leader Harry Lehr.

Drexel died of a heart attack at his home in Boca Grande on February 25, 1946. His widow died on November 29, 1955, in Manhattan.

=== Descendants ===
Through his daughter Edith, he was a grandfather of John Sergeant Cram III (1932–2007), who married Lady Jeanne Campbell, the only daughter of Ian Campbell, 11th Duke of Argyll. She had previously been married to American writer Norman Mailer. Lady Jeanne and John had a daughter, Cusi Cram (b. 1967), an actress, a Herrick-prize-winning playwright, and an Emmy-nominated writer for the children's animated television program, Arthur.
