= A. A. Talmage =

American railroad executive

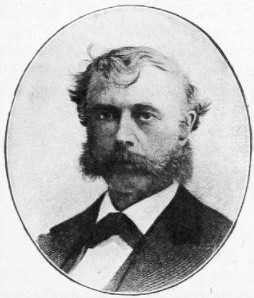
- Born: Archibald Alexander Talmage; April 25, 1834; Warren County, New Jersey
- Died: June 28, 1887 (aged 53); Peru, Indiana
- Occupation: Railroad executive

Archibald Alexander Talmage (April 25, 1834 – June 28, 1887) was a 19th-century vice-president and general manager of the Wabash Railroad. Born in Warren County, New Jersey, of Scottish descent, his father was a Presbyterian minister. He worked in a country store in Goshen, New York, for several years beginning when he was fifteen. At the age of eighteen, Talmage was appointed clerk in the freight department of the New York and Erie Railroad, where he remained for a year. He worked for a hardware wholesale firm on Dey Street in New York City afterward. During the winter of 1854, Talmage moved to Chicago, Illinois, where he found employment as a clerk in the freight department of the Michigan Southern Railroad.

== Railroad career ==
He advanced to become supervisor of freight exchanged at the lake terminus of the railway at Monroe, Michigan. He was transferred to Toledo, Ohio, where he stayed until August 1858. He worked as trainmaster there and was in charge of all employees at the Toledo terminus. Talmage was a passenger train conductor in St. Louis, Missouri, for the Terre Haute and Alton Railroad during the next portion of his career. In April 1864, he was appointed assistant superintendent of the Ohio and Mississippi Railroad before resigning to take a position on military roads.

In 1868, Talmage was appointed manager of the Indianapolis and St. Louis Railroad. By 1871, he was general superintendent of the Atlantic and Pacific Railroad, where he remained for twelve years. On March 1, 1874, he became the fourth vice-president and general transportation manager of the consolidated Wabash Railroad and Missouri Pacific Railroad. Soon afterward, the Wabash was removed from the Missouri Pacific and its jurisdiction assumed by a United States court. Talmage was named general manager of the Wabash on July 10, 1884. His record in this position was successful. The railroad grew and generated a profit. He became vice-president and general manager of the Wabash Western Railroad which had its headquarters in New York City.

== Private life and death ==
Talmage was married twice and had eight children. A son, C.H. Talmage, became a resident engineer for the Wabash Railroad.

Talmage's death was hastened by a railroad strike in the southwestern United States fifteen months before his death in 1887. He died on his way to a yachting cruise on Lake Erie. He was aboard his private car, Bergen Point, on the Wabash, when he experienced a fainting spell about thirty miles from Peru, Indiana. His body was transported to St. Louis and then to Union Station in Saint Louis. From there, it was taken to his residence at 3651 Washington Avenue.
