= Helen Beresford, Baroness Decies =

American-born British noblewoman

The Right Honourable The Lady Decies
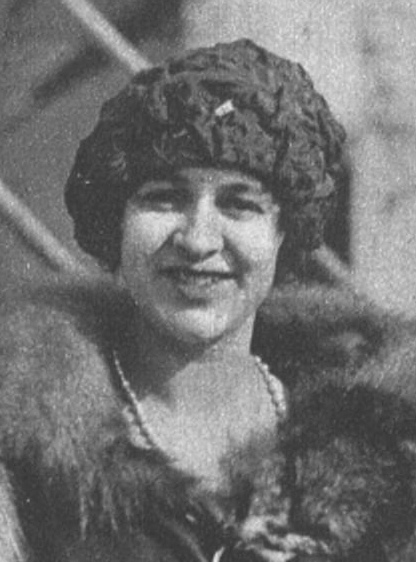
- Lady Decies in 1919
- Born: Vivian Gould; May 2, 1893
- Died: February 3, 1931 (aged 37); London, UK
- Spouse: John Beresford, 5th Baron Decies (m. 1911)
- Children: 3
- Parent(s): George Jay Gould; Edith Kingdon
- Relatives: Jay Gould (grandfather)

Helen Vivien Beresford, Baroness Decies, formerly Helen Vivien Gould (May 2, 1893 – February 3, 1931) was an American socialite and philanthropist. She was one of the two Jay Gould descendants to marry into European aristocracy.

== Early life ==
Helen Vivien Gould was born on May 2, 1893, in the United States. She was the fourth of seven children born to George Jay Gould (1864–1923), a railroad executive; and Edith Kingdon (1864–1921), an actress. Among her siblings were Kingdon Gould I, Marjorie Gwynne Gould, Jay Gould II, Edith Catherine Gould, and Gloria Gould.

Her paternal grandparents were Jay Gould, a leading American railroad developer and speculator known as one of the ruthless robber barons of the Gilded Age, and Helen Day (née Miller) Gould.

== Personal life ==
On February 7, 1911, Helen married John Graham Hope de la Poer Horsley Beresford (1866–1944), the 5th Baron Decies. John was the son of William Robert John Beresford, 3rd Baron Decies and Catherine Anne Dent. Together they had three children:

- Eileen Vivien de la Poer Beresford (1912-1975) who married Robert Alfred O'Brien
- Catherine Moya de la Poer Beresford (1913–1967) who married Patrick Herbert Bellew in 1936. They divorced and she married Max Wilhelm Johannsen in 1946.
- Arthur George Marcus Douglas de la Poer Beresford (1915-1992) the 6th Baron Decies

She died in February 1931 of jaundice and a heart attack in London. After her death, Lord Decies married Elizabeth Wharton Drexel, the daughter of Joseph William Drexel, on May 25, 1936. He died on 31 January 1944 at age 77.
