= Jay Gould II =

American real tennis player

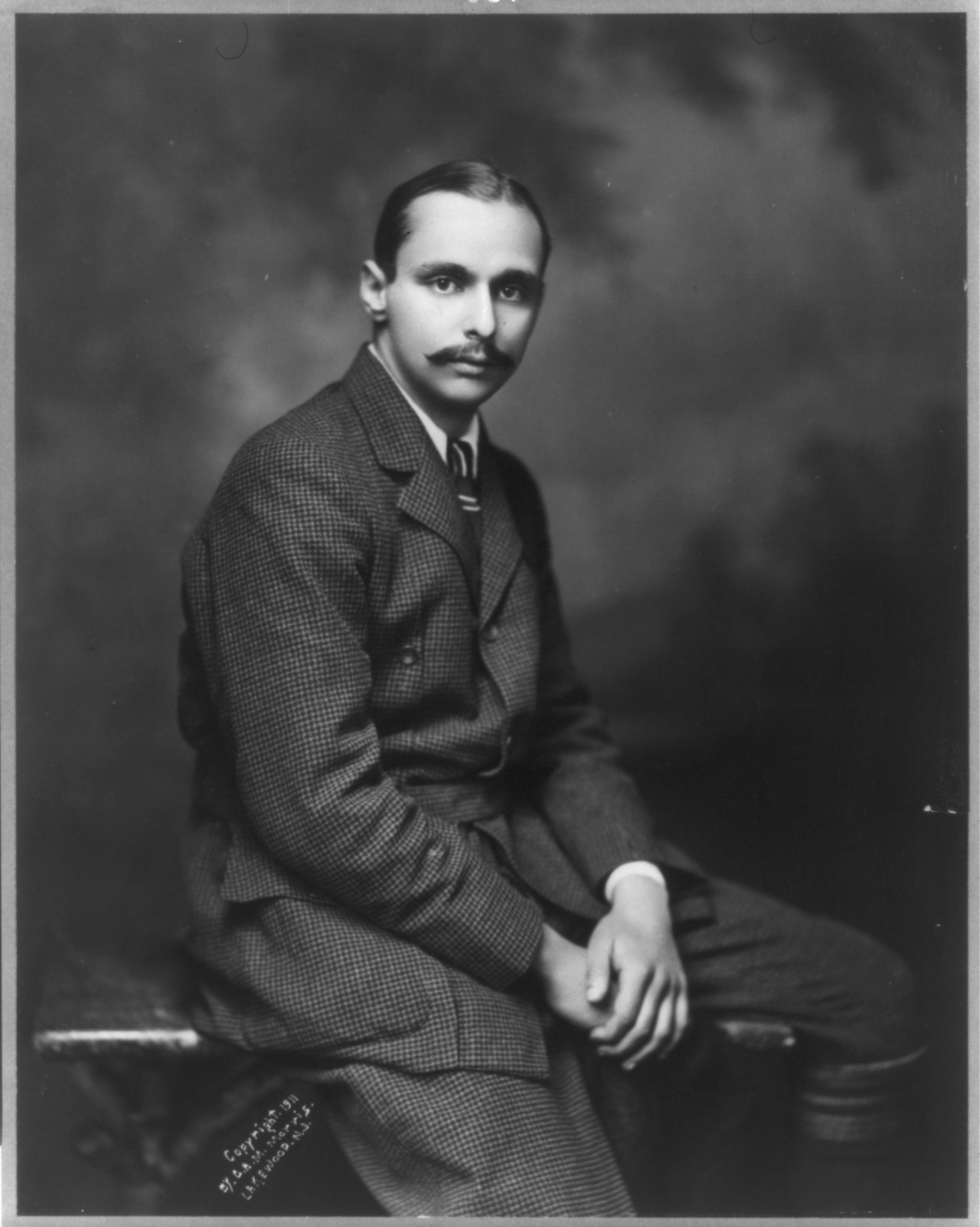
- Born: September 1, 1888; New York City, US
- Died: January 26, 1935 (aged 46); Margaretville, New York, US
- Education: Columbia College
- Occupation: Tennis player
- Spouse: Anne Douglass Graham
- Children: Jay Gould III
- Parent(s): George Jay Gould; Edith Kingdon
- Relatives: Jay Gould (grandfather)

Olympic medal record

Men's jeu de paume

Representing the United States
Gold medal – first place	1908 London	Individual

Jay Gould II (September 1, 1888 – January 26, 1935) was an American real tennis player and a grandson of the railroad magnate Jay Gould. He was the world champion (1914–1916) and the Olympic gold medalist (London, 1908, then under the name jeu de paume). He held the U.S. Amateur Championship title continuously from 1906 to 1925, winning 18 times (no tournaments were held during the U.S. involvement in World War I). During the same period, he never lost a set to an American amateur, and lost only one singles match, to English champion E.M. Baerlein. The court built for him by his father at the family's Georgian Court estate was restored in 2005. Jay Gould II is the great-great-uncle of US Olympic cyclist Georgia Gould, who qualified to race in the London 2012 Olympiad.

== Biography ==
He was born on September 1, 1888, to George Jay Gould. He was educated at Columbia College and was a member of the class of 1911. He was already a national and world champion in court tennis as a freshman at Columbia. He also played squash for the Columbia University Club of New York.

== Marriage and children ==
He married Anne Douglass Graham, a cousin of Princess Abigail Campbell Kawananakoa and a granddaughter of a Hawaiian chiefess, and had the following children:

- Eleanor Gould, born January 31, 1912, who married successively William N. Haskill III and Ludlow W. Stephens.
- Anne Douglass Gould, (March 5, 1913 to April 4, 1962). She married and divorced Frank Spencer J. Meador, Herman H. Elsbury, Gus Wagoner, Ezra Wogoman, and Donald Valentine.
- Jay Gould III (May 13, 1920 – May 11, 1987). He was a lieutenant in the U.S. Army during World War II. He married Jennifer Beryl Bruce, the daughter of Nigel Bruce, in 1944 and divorced in 1946. He next married Blair Roemer Stevens on November 27, 1948. Gould married a third time on June 30, 1953, to Lina Romay, the singer and actress.

== Death ==
He died on January 26, 1935, at Margaretville, New York. The cause of death was "hemorrhage of the esophagus brought on by a complexity of ailments."

== See also ==
- Real tennis world champions
