= Robber baron (industrialist) =

Term of social criticism for unethical, wealthy businessmen

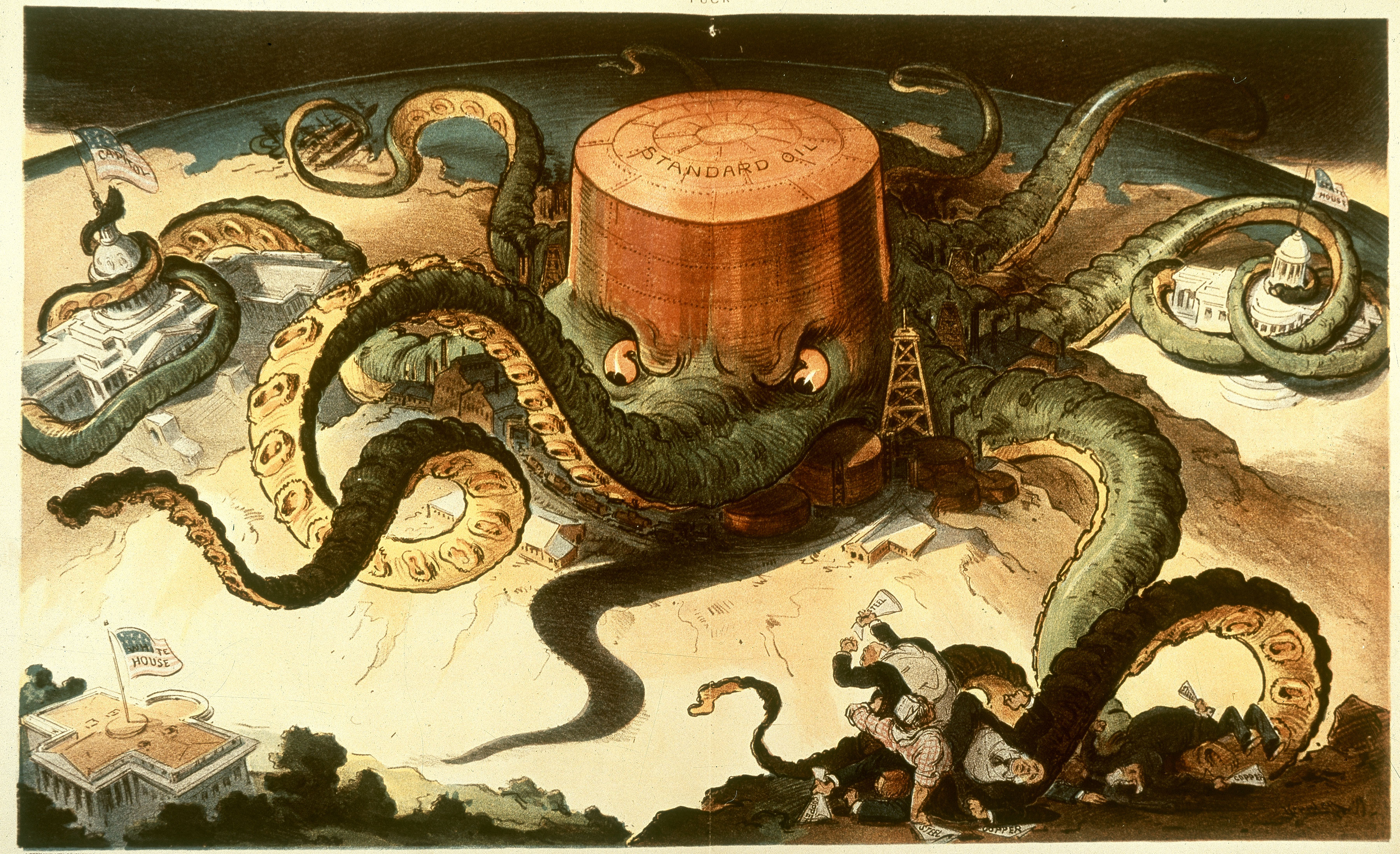
1904 depiction of an acquisitive and manipulative Standard Oil (founded by John D. Rockefeller) as an all-powerful octopus

Robber baron is a term first applied by 19th century muckrakers and others as social criticism to certain wealthy, powerful, and unethical 19th-century American businessmen. The term appeared in that use as early as the August 1870 issue of The Atlantic Monthly magazine. By the late 19th century, the term was typically applied to businessmen who used exploitative practices to amass their wealth. Those practices included unfettered consumption and destruction of natural resources, influencing high levels of government, wage slavery, squashing competition by acquiring their competitors, and to create monopolies and/or trusts that control the market. The label was intended to evoke the abuses of feudal "robber barons" in medieval Europe. In the modern sense the term combines the incompatible traits of criminal ("robber") and illegitimate aristocracy ("baron") with those of a republic.

== Usage ==
The term 'robber baron' derives from the Raubritter (robber knights), the medieval German lords who charged illegal tolls (unauthorized by the Holy Roman Emperor) on the primitive roads crossing their lands, or charged larger tolls along the Rhine river.

The metaphor appeared as early as February 9, 1859, when The New York Times used it to characterize the business practices of Cornelius Vanderbilt. Historian T. J. Stiles says the metaphor "conjures up visions of titanic monopolists who crushed competitors, rigged markets, and corrupted government. In their greed and power, legend has it, they held sway over a helpless democracy." Hostile cartoonists might dress the offenders in royal garb to underscore the offense against democracy.

The first such usage was against Vanderbilt, for taking money from high-priced, government-subsidized shippers, in order to not compete on their routes. Political cronies had been granted special shipping routes by the state, but told legislators their costs were so high that they needed to charge high prices and still receive extra money from the taxpayers as funding. Vanderbilt's private shipping company began running the same routes, charging a fraction of the price, making a large profit without taxpayer subsidy. The state-funded shippers then began paying Vanderbilt money to not ship on their route. A critic of this tactic drew a political comic depicting Vanderbilt as a feudal robber baron extracting a toll.

In his 1934 book The Robber Barons: The Great American Capitalists 1861-1901, Matthew Josephson argued that the industrialists who were called robber barons have a complicated legacy in the history of American economic and social life. In the book's original foreword, he claims the robber barons:

"more or less knowingly played the leading roles in an age of industrial revolution. Even their quarrels, intrigues and misadventures (too often treated as merely diverting or picturesque) are part of the mechanism of our history. Under their hands the renovation of our economic life proceeded relentlessly: large-scale production replaced the scattered, decentralized mode of production; industrial enterprises became more concentrated, more “efficient” technically, and essentially “coöperative,” where they had been purely individualistic and lamentably wasteful. But all this revolutionizing effort is branded with the motive of private gain on the part of the new captains of industry. To organize and exploit the resources of a nation upon a gigantic scale, to regiment its farmers and workers into harmonious corps of producers, and to do this only in the name of an uncontrolled appetite for private profit—here surely is the great inherent contradiction whence so much disaster, outrage and misery has flowed.

Charles R. Geisst says, "in a Darwinist age, Vanderbilt developed a reputation as a plunderer who took no prisoners." Hal Bridges said that the term represented the idea that "business leaders in the United States from about 1865 to 1900 were, on the whole, a set of avaricious rascals who habitually cheated and robbed investors and consumers, corrupted government, fought ruthlessly among themselves, and in general carried on predatory activities comparable to those of the robber barons of medieval Europe."

== Critique ==
Historian Richard White argues that the builders of the transcontinental railroads have attracted a great deal of attention but the interpretations are contradictory: at first very hostile and then very favorable. White writes that they were depicted as:

Robber Barons, standing for a Gilded Age of corruption, monopoly, and rampant individualism. Their corporations were the Octopus, devouring all in its path. In the twentieth century and the twenty-first they became entrepreneurs, necessary business revolutionaries, ruthlessly changing existing practices and demonstrating the protean nature of American capitalism. Their new corporations also transmuted and became manifestations of the "Visible Hand," managerial rationality that eliminated waste, increased productivity and brought bourgeois values to replace those of financial buccaneers.

=== 1860s–1920s ===
Historian John Tipple examined the writings of the 50 most influential analysts who used the robber baron model in the 1865–1914 period. He argued:

The originators of the Robber Baron concept were not the injured, the poor, the faddists, the jealous, or a dispossessed elite, but rather a frustrated group of observers led at last by protracted years of harsh depression to believe that the American dream of abundant prosperity for all was a hopeless myth. ... Thus the creation of the Robber Baron stereotype seems to have been the product of an impulsive popular attempt to explain the shift in the structure of American society in terms of the obvious. Rather than make the effort to understand the intricate processes of change, most critics appeared to slip into the easy vulgarizations of the "devil-view" of history which ingenuously assumes that all human misfortunes can be traced to the machinations of an easily located set of villains—in this case, the big businessmen of America. This assumption was clearly implicit in almost all of the criticism of the period.

=== 1930s–1970s ===
American historian Matthew Josephson further popularized the term during the Great Depression in his book, published in 1934. Josephson's view was that, like the medieval German princes, American big businessmen had amassed huge fortunes immorally, unethically, and unjustly. This theme was popular during the Great Depression of the 1930s, when the public often expressed scorn for big business. Historian Steve Fraser notes that the mood was sharply hostile toward big business:

Biographies of Mellon, Carnegie and Rockefeller were often laced with moral censure, warning that "tories of industry" were a threat to democracy and that parasitism, aristocratic pretension and tyranny are an inevitable consequence of concentrated wealth, whether accumulated dynastically or more impersonally by faceless corporations. This scholarship, and the cultural persuasion of which it was an expression, drew on a deeply rooted feeling that was partly religious and partly egalitarian and democratic, a sensibility stretching back to William Jennings Bryan, Andrew Jackson, and Tom Paine.

However, contrary opinions by academic historians began to appear as the Depression ended. Business historian Allan Nevins advanced the "Industrial Statesman" thesis in his John D. Rockefeller: The Heroic Age of American Enterprise (2 vols., 1940), arguing that while Rockefeller engaged in unethical and illegal business practices, he also helped to bring order to the industrial chaos of the day. According to Nevins, it was Gilded Age capitalists who, by imposing order and stability on competitive business, made the United States the foremost economy by the 20th century.

In 1958 Bridges reported that, "The most vehement and persistent controversy in business history has been that waged by the critics and defenders of the "robber baron" concept of the American businessman."

== Contemporary use ==
In the popular culture the metaphor continues. In 1975 the student body of Stanford University voted to use "Robber Barons" as the nickname for their sports teams. However, school administrators disallowed it, saying it was disrespectful to the school's founder, Leland Stanford.

In academia, the education division of the National Endowment for the Humanities has prepared a lesson plan for schools asking whether "robber baron" or "captain of industry" is the better term. They state:

In this lesson, you and your students will attempt to establish a distinction between robber barons and captains of industry. Students will uncover some of the less honorable deeds as well as the shrewd business moves and highly charitable acts of the great industrialists and financiers. It has been argued that only because such people were able to amass great amounts of capital could our country become the world's greatest industrial power. Some of the actions of these men, which could only happen in a period of economic laissez faire, resulted in poor conditions for workers, but in the end, may also have enabled our present day standard of living.

This debate about the morality of certain business practices has continued in the popular culture, as in the performances in Europe in 2012 by Bruce Springsteen, who sang about bankers as "greedy thieves" and "robber barons". During the Occupy Wall Street protests of 2011, the term was used by Vermont Senator Bernie Sanders in his attacks on Wall Street.

The metaphor has also been used to characterize Russian oligarchs allied to Boris Yeltsin.

The leaders of Big Tech companies have all been described as being modern-day robber barons, particularly Jeff Bezos because of his influence on his newspaper, The Washington Post. Their rising wealth and power stands in contrast with the shrinking middle class. Elon Musk has also been accused of being a modern-day robber baron.

In contrast, conservative American historian Burton W. Folsom Jr. argues that the robber barons were either political entrepreneurs (who lobby government for subsidies and monopoly rights), or market entrepreneurs (who innovate and reduce costs to provide the best good or service at the lowest price).

In his presidential farewell address, U.S. President Joe Biden invoked the term "robber baron" to caution against the growing influence of concentrated wealth and power in American society. He warned that these developments could signal a shift toward oligarchy, drawing parallels to the economic and social inequalities of the Gilded Age.

== List of businessmen labelled as robber barons ==
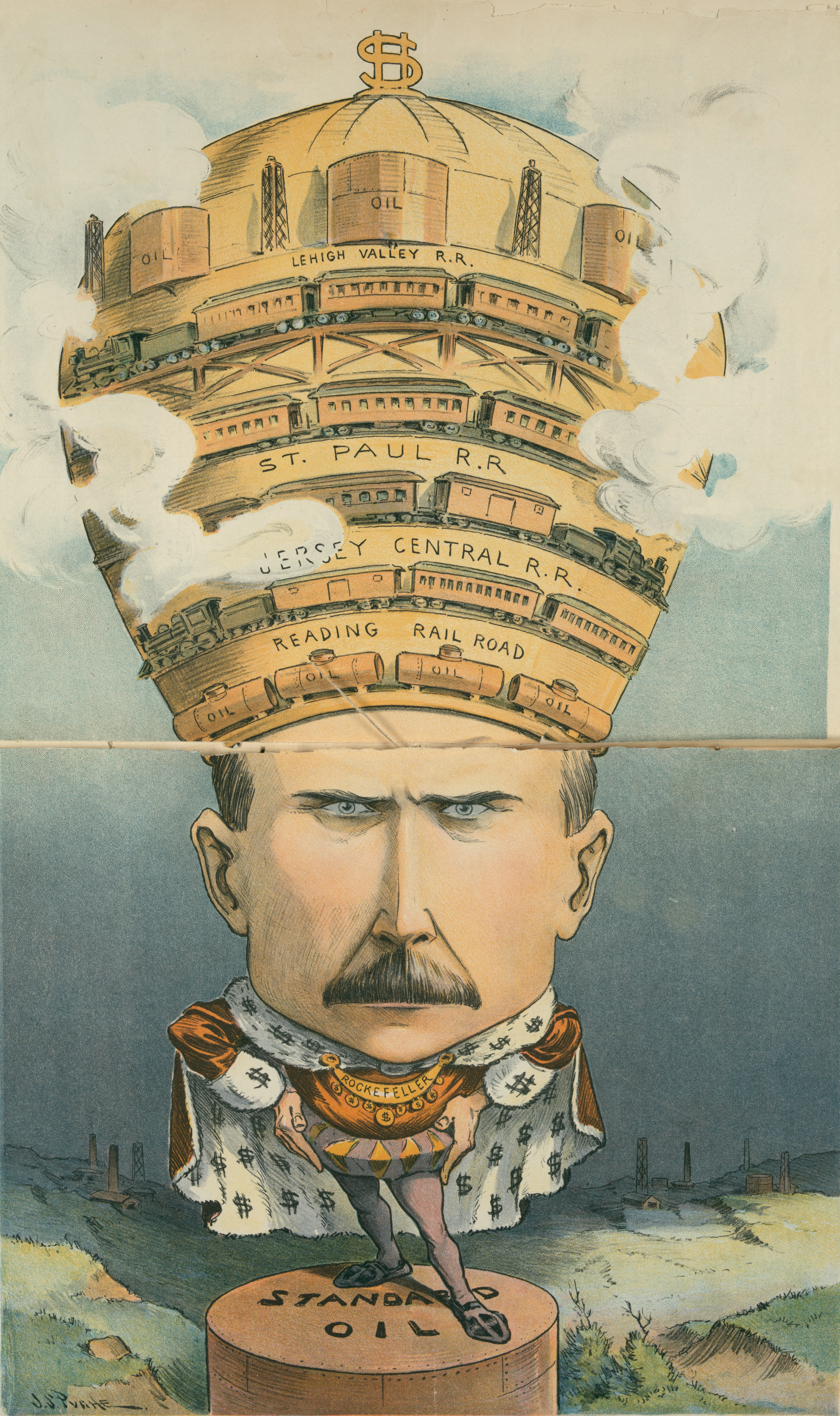
1901 US cartoon from Puck depicting John D. Rockefeller as a business despot

Individuals identified in Josephson's Robber Barons (1934):

- John Jacob Astor (real estate, fur) – New York
- Andrew Carnegie (steel) – Pittsburgh and New York
- Jay Cooke (finance) – Philadelphia
- Charles Crocker (railroads) – California
- Edward L. Doheny (oil) – California
- Daniel Drew (finance) – New York
- James Buchanan Duke (tobacco, electric power) – Durham, North Carolina
- James Fisk (finance) – New York
- Henry Morrison Flagler (Standard Oil, railroads) – New York and Florida
- Henry Clay Frick (steel) – Pittsburgh and New York
- John Warne Gates (barbed wire, oil) – Texas
- Jay Gould (railroads) – New York
- E. H. Harriman (railroads) – New York
- James J. Hill (fuel, coal, steamboats, railroads) – St Paul, Minnesota
- Collis Potter Huntington (railroads) – California, Virginia, West Virginia
- Andrew Mellon (finance, oil) – Pittsburgh
- J. P. Morgan (finance, industrial consolidation) – New York
- John D. Rockefeller (Standard Oil) – Cleveland, Ohio
- Henry Huttleston Rogers (Standard Oil, copper), New York
- Thomas Fortune Ryan (public transit, tobacco) – New York
- Russell Sage (finance, railroads) – New York
- Charles M. Schwab (steel) – Pittsburgh and New York
- Leland Stanford (railroads) – California
- Cornelius Vanderbilt (maritime, railroads) – New York
- Peter Arrell Browne Widener (mass transit) – Philadelphia, Pennsylvania
- Charles Yerkes (street railroads) – Chicago

Identified as "robber barons" by other sources:

- William A. Clark (copper) – Butte, Montana
- James Dunsmuir (coal, lumber) – Victoria, BC Canada
- Marshall Field (retail) – Chicago
- William Randolph Hearst (media mogul) – California
- Charles T. Hinde (railroads, maritime, shipping, hotels) – Mt. Carmel, IL San Diego, CA
- Mark Hopkins Jr. (railroads) – California
- John C. Osgood (coal mining, iron) – Colorado
- Henry B. Plant (railroads) – Florida
- A. S. W. Rosenbach (antique bookdealer) – Philadelphia
- Joseph Seligman (banking) – New York
- John D. Spreckels (maritime, railroads, sugar) – California

Contemporary:

- Jeff Bezos (Amazon, Blue Origin, purchasing The Washington Post)
- Bill Gates (Microsoft)
- Elon Musk (SpaceX, Tesla, X, The Boring Company)
- Mark Zuckerberg (Facebook, and its acquisitions of Oculus, WhatsApp, Instagram, and Mapillary)

== See also ==
- Big Oil, the 21st century term for the top 7 "supermajor" oil and gas companies
- Big Tech, the 21st century term for the largest IT companies in the world
- Business magnate
- Business oligarch
- Media proprietor
- Ruling class
