= Mervyn Wingfield (disambiguation) =

Mervyn Wingfield (1911–2005) was a Royal Navy officer

Mervyn Wingfield may also refer to:

- Mervyn Wingfield, 7th Viscount Powerscourt (1836–1904), Irish peer
- Mervyn Wingfield, 8th Viscount Powerscourt (1880–1947), Irish peer
- Mervyn Wingfield, 9th Viscount Powerscourt (1905–1973), Irish peer
- Mervyn Wingfield, 10th Viscount Powerscourt (1935–2015), Irish peer
- Mervyn Wingfield, 11th Viscount Powerscourt (born 1963), Irish peer

== See also ==
- Mervyn Winfield (1933–2014), English cricketer
