= Jaeger-LeCoultre Gold Cup =

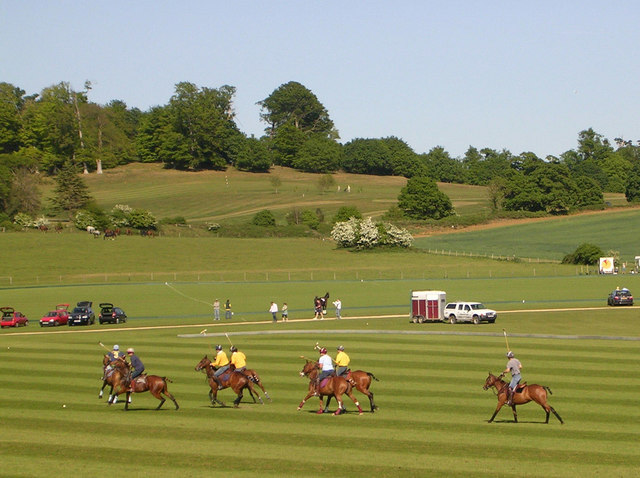
Polo at Cowdray Park, 2007

The British Open Polo Championship for the Cowdray Gold Cup is an annual polo tournament held at Cowdray Park, West Sussex, England.

It is the premier polo tournament in Europe at High Goal (22 goal) level.

The tournament is held at Cowdray Park Polo Club with matches being played at their Lawns Grounds and Ambersham Grounds over the course of a 3-week period. Culminating in the Gold Cup Final held at Lawns grounds in the shadows of the Cowdray Ruins.

== History ==
The tournament was established in 1956 by 3rd Viscount Cowdray. Players have included members of the British royal family including Prince Philip, Duke of Edinburgh and King Charles III, Kerry Packer and his son James Packer.

It was formerly sponsored by champagne house Veuve Clicquot and watchmaker Jaeger-LeCoultre.

According to polo player Mark Tomlinson, it is "the most important tournament in the UK".

According to polo patron of la Lechuza Caracas Team Victor Vargas, it was "the most important tournament for my career as a polo Patron and a polo Player. Winner of British Gold Cup in 2007.

== List of Champions ==
Year	Team	Players
1956	Los Indios	J M Mareno, J Nagore, A Heguy, J E Harriott
1957	Windsor Park	Juan Nelson, E Lalor, Col H P Guinness, HRH the Duke of Edinburgh
1958	Cowdray Park	Lt Col P W Dollar, Lt Col A F Harper, Rao Raja Hanut Singh, J Lakin
1959	Casarejo	Baron Elie de Rothschild, R Gracida, A Gracida, P Domecq La Riva
1960	Casarejo	Baron Elie de Rothschild, R Gracida, A Gracida, P Domecq La Riva
1961	Cowdray Park	Brig M A Baig, Paul Withers, Lt Col A F Harper, C M T Smith-Ryland
1962	Cowdray Park	Brig M A Baig, Bryan Bethell, Paul Withers, C M T Smith-Ryland
1963	La Vulci	Marquess Giacinto Guglielmi di Vulci, J M T Zavaleta, C de la Serna, D Gonzalez
1965	Jersey Lilies	R Diaz, P Kemple, Rao Raja Hanut Singh, E Moore
1967	Woolmers Park	E Zorilla, Dr J Marin Moreno, J L Lucas, C Garros
1968	Pimms	Earl of Brecknock, Julian Hipwood, D Gonzalez, A Goti
1969	Windsor Park	Major Lord Patrick Beresford, Marquis of Waterford, The Duke of Edinburgh, Paul Withers
1970	Boca Raton	J Casey, Jack Oxley, Roy Barry Jnr, John T Oxley
1971	Pimms	Lord Brecknock, E Zorilla, D Gonzalez, Major R I Ferguson
1972	Pimms	Lord Brecknock, R Tongg, D Gonzalez, Major R I Ferguson
1973	Stowell Park	Lord Vestey, Hon Mark Vestey, E R Moore, Héctor Barrantes
1974	Stowell Park	Lord Vestey, D Gemmell, E Moore, Héctor Barrantes
1975	Greenhill Farm	J R Sharp, L Armour III, T Wayman, Major R I Ferguson
1976	Stowell Park	J N Williams, Hon Mark Vestey, E R Moore, Héctor Barrantes
1977	Foxcote	P G Palumbo, Hon Mark Vestey, E R Moore, D Devrient
1978	Stowell Park	Lord Vestey, A P Marriage, E R Moore, Héctor Barrantes
1979	Songhai	Ollie Ellis, Alan Kent, Gonzalo Pieres Sr., A Pieres
1980	Stowell Park	P Elliott, Hon Mark Vestey, E R Moore, Héctor Barrantes
1981	Falcons	A Ebeid, Gonzalo Pieres Sr., H Merlos, L Amaya
1982	Southfield	D Yeoman, Carlos Gracida, J Walker, Lord Charles Beresford
1983	Falcons	A Hine, Carlos Gracida, M Gracida, A Ebeid
1984	Southfield	D Yeoman, Alan Kent, Owen Rinehart, David Jamison
1985	Maple Leafs	Julian Hipwood, A Devcich, Galen Weston, L Amaya/M Glue
1986	Tramontana	Anthony Embiricos, Martin Brown, Carlos Gracida, Jesus Baez
1987	Tramontana	Anthony Embiricos, R Gonzalez/M Azzaro, Carlos Gracida, David Jamison
1988	Tramontana	Anthony Embiricos, Valerian Aguillar, Carlos Gracida, David Jamison
1989	Tramontana	Anthony Embiricos, R Gonzalez, Carlos Gracida, David Jamison
1990	Hildon	M Amoore, T Llorente, H Hipwood, N Lobel
1991	Tramontana	Anthony Embiricos, Adolfo Cambiaso, Carlos Gracida, Adam Buchanan
1992	Black Bears	Urs Schwarzenbach, S Merlos, P Merlos, M Brown
1993	Alcatel	P Webb, Gabriel Donoso, P Alberdi, I Gonzlez
1994	Ellerston Black	O Taylor, R Gonzalez, Carlos Gracida, James Packer
1995	Ellerston White	O Hipwood, Carlos Gracida, Gonzalo Pieres Sr., Kerry Packer
1996	C S Brooks	Sebastian Dawnay/John Fisher, Ignacio Heguy, Eduardo Heguy, B Johnson
1997	Labegorce	H Perrodo, J Novillo Astrada, Carlos Gracida, Jamie Le Hardy
1998	Ellerston	James Beim, Adolfo Cambiaso, Gonzalo Pieres Sr., J Fisher
1999	Pommery	J Manconi, H Brett, J Bollini, Alejandro Díaz-Alberdi
2000	Geebung	D Allen, Bautista Heguy, Adolfo Cambiaso, Rick Stowe
2001	Dubai	A Albwardy, L Castagnola, Adolfo Cambiaso, Ryan Pemble
2002	Black Bears	Urs Schwarzenbach, J Novillo Astrada, E Novillo Astrada, A Novillo Astrada
2003	Hildon Sport	Nina Vestey, Mark Tomlinson, Luke Tomlinson, J P Clarkin
2004	Azzurra	Negro Novillo Astrada, Juan Martin Nero, Marcos Heguy, Stefano Marsaglia
2005	Dubai	Tariq Albwardy, Lucas Monteverde, Alejandro Díaz-Alberdi, Agustin Nero
2006	Black Bears	Guy Schwarzenbach, Eduardo Novillo Astrada, Javier Novillo Astrada, Lucas James
2007	Lechuza Caracas	Victor Vargas, Pite Merlos, Sebastian Merlos, Henry Fisher
2008	Loro Piana	David Stirling, Alfio Marchini, Juan Martin Nero, Jamie Peel
2009	La Bamba De Areco	Jean Farncois Decaux, Gonzalito Pieres, Facundo Pieres, Tomas Garbarini Islas
2010	Dubai	Rashid Albwardy, Francisco Vismara, Pablo Mac Donough, Adolfo Cambiaso
2011	Zacara	Gonzalo Deltour, Lyndon Lea, Hillario Ulloa, Ignatius Du Plessis
2012	Cortium	Francisco Elizalde, Polito Pieres, Jaime Huidobro, Adrian Kirby
2013	Zacara	Facundo Pieres, Lyndon Lea, Rodrigo de Andrade, Mathew Perry
2014	Dubai	Rashid Albwardy, Ali Paterson, Diego Cavanagh, Adolfo Cambiaso
2015	King Power Foxes	Top Srivaddhanaprabha, Hugo Lewis, Gonzalito Pieres, Facundo Pieres
2016	King Power Foxes	Tal Srivaddhanaprabha, Hugo Lewis, Gonzalito Pieres, Facundo Pieres
2017	King Power Foxes	Hugo Taylor, James Fewster, Gonzalito Pieres, Facundo Pieres
2018	El Remanso	Charles Hanbury, Oliver Cudmore, James Beim, James Harper
2019	Dubai	Camilo Castagnola, Rashid Albwardy, Bartolomé Castagnola Jr, Ignatius Du Plessis
2020	Next Generation	Jean Francois Decaux, Poroto Cambiaso, Diego Cavanagh, Adolfo Cambiaso
2021	Thai Polo NP	Louis Hine, Ned Hine, Nicolas Pieres, James Harper
2022	Park Place	Andrey Borodin/Josh Hyde, Louis Hine, Francisco Elizalde, Facundo Pieres
2023	UAE	Tommy Beresford, Lukin Monteverde, Bartolomé Castagnola Jr, H. H Sheika Maitha sub Kayley Maria Smith
2024	Dubai	Camilo Castagnola, Antonio Heguy, Beltran Laulhé, Rashid Albwardy
2025	La Dolfina Scone	Mia Cambiaso, Hugo Taylor, Paco de Narvaez, Adolfo Cambiaso
2026	Gaston	Jean-Paul Luksic, Gonzalo Ferrari, Beltran Laulhe, Cruz Heguy

== Statistics ==
=== Titles by team ===
Rank	Team	Titles	Winning years
1	Dubai	6	2001, 2005, 2010, 2014, 2019, 2024
2	Stowell Park	5	1973, 1974, 1976, 1978, 1980
2	Tramontana	5	1986, 1987, 1988, 1989, 1991
4	Cowdray Park	3	1958, 1961, 1962
4	Pimms	3	1968, 1971, 1972
4	Black Bears	3	1992, 2002, 2006
4	Ellerston / Ellerston Black / Ellerston White	3	1994, 1995, 1998
4	King Power Foxes	3	2015, 2016, 2017
9	Windsor Park	2	1957, 1969
9	Casarejo	2	1959, 1960
9	Falcons	2	1981, 1983
9	Southfield	2	1982, 1984
9	Zacara	2	2011, 2013

=== Titles by player ===
The list below highlights athletes with 3 or more titles.

Rank	Player	Titles
1	Carlos Gracida	10
2	Adolfo Cambiaso	8
3	E. R. Moore	7
4	Facundo Pieres	6
5	Anthony Embiricos	5
5	Héctor Barrantes	5
7	D. Gonzalez	4
7	David Jamison	4
7	Gonzalo "Gonzalito" Pieres Jr.	4
7	Gonzalo Pieres Sr.	4
7	Mark Vestey	4
7	Rashid Albwardy	4
13	Lord Vestey	3
13	Major R. I. Ferguson	3
13	Paul Withers	3
13	R. Gonzalez	3
