= Grania Langrishe =

Irish botanical illustrator and artist

Lady Langrishe Grania Langrishe
- Born: Grania Sybil Enid Wingfield; 25 April 1934 (age 91)
- Spouse: Hercules Ralph Hume Langrishe

Grania Sybil Enid, Lady Langrishe (née Wingfield; born 25 April 1934), is an Irish botanical illustrator and artist.

== Life ==
Grania Sybil Enid Wingfield was born on 25 April 1934, a daughter of Mervyn Patrick Wingfield (who succeeded as Viscount Powerscourt in March 1947) and his wife Sheila Claude Beddington. She married Sir Hercules Ralph Hume Langrishe, 7th Baronet, on 21 April 1955. The couple had four children: Sir James Hercules Langrishe, 8th Baronet (born 1957), Miranda Grania Langrishe (born 1959), Georgina Emma Langrishe (born 1961) and Atalanta Sue Langrishe, now Pollock (born 1963), an artist.

Though she grew up at the Powerscourt Estate, her mother, Lady Powerscourt, moved the family to Bermuda for a while during her childhood. This inspired her lifelong fascination with plants. Although Langrishe had no formal training, she began painting botanical illustrations in watercolour. She was elected to the Watercolour Society of Ireland in 1984. Langrishe regularly exhibits with the Watercolour Society. Her work was commissioned for two books on trees and plants in Ireland.

Langrishe lives at Arlonstown, Dunsany, County Meath.

== Illustrations ==
- Irish Trees: Myth, Legend and Folklore by Niall Mac Coitir
- Irish Wild Plants: Myths Legends and Folklore by Niall Mac Coitir
