= Susan Barrantes =

British documentary filmmaker (1937–1998)

- Born: Susan Mary Wright; 9 June 1937; Bramcote, Nottinghamshire, England
- Died: 19 September 1998 (aged 61); Tres Lomas, Argentina
- Spouses: Ronald Ferguson (m. 1956; div. 1974); Héctor Barrantes (m. 1975; died 1990)
- Children: Jane Lüdecke; Sarah Ferguson

Susan Mary Barrantes (née Wright, later Ferguson; 9 June 1937 – 19 September 1998) was a documentary filmmaker and the mother of Sarah Ferguson, as well as the maternal grandmother of Princesses Beatrice and Eugenie.

Her elopement with an Argentinian polo player caused a stir in social circles. After his death, she became a film producer in Buenos Aires. She died in a car crash at the age of 61.

== Early life and first marriage ==
Barrantes was born Susan Mary Wright on 9 June 1937 in Bramcote, Nottinghamshire, the daughter of FitzHerbert Wright and the Hon. Doreen Wingfield, sister of Mervyn Patrick Wingfield, 9th Viscount Powerscourt. She was the youngest of four children, with two sisters, Brigid and Davinia, and a brother, Bryan. Susan's maternal grandfather was Mervyn Wingfield, 8th Viscount Powerscourt. Her father was a director of the coal and iron-producing Butterley Company in Ripley, Derbyshire, and was the great-grandson of industrialist and philanthropist Francis Wright.

Susan completed school and for a short time attended secretarial college. During the debutante season of 1954, she was presented at the court of Queen Elizabeth II.

On 17 January 1956, Susan married Lieutenant Ronald Ferguson (1931–2003) at St Margaret's, Westminster. He rose to the rank of Major, played polo with Prince Philip, Duke of Edinburgh, and became the polo manager for Charles, Prince of Wales. Ronald and Susan had two daughters: Jane Louisa, born on 26 August 1957, and Sarah Margaret, later known as the Duchess of York, born on 15 October 1959. A third pregnancy circa 1968 ended in miscarriage as Susan developed pre-eclampsia.

== Divorce and second marriage ==
In 1972, Susan caused a stir in society circles by leaving her family to move to Argentina with professional polo player Héctor Barrantes. Her daughters were then raised by their father Ronald with the help of extended family. Susan and Ronald divorced in 1974, and in 1975 she married Barrantes.

Susan and her new husband moved to the ranch-manor "El Pucará" in Tres Lomas, Argentina. In her writings and filmographic work, she recorded that aside from the birth of her two daughters, her life in Argentina was the happiest time of her life personally and professionally, since she had the chance to explore and develop a documentary film career that combined her two passions, polo and film. She also assisted her husband's business of breeding polo ponies and cattle until his death from cancer in 1990.

Widowhood brought financial difficulties for Susan, and she once again decided to start afresh. Selling more than half the farm to the polo-playing Australian media magnate Kerry Packer, she relocated to a large flat in the Recoleta-Palermo borough of Buenos Aires and set up a television production company, making films about horses.

Susan remained firm friends with Prince Charles, who contributed a foreword to her book Polo.

== Death ==
While returning to her country home on 19 September 1998, the Rover 400 she was driving collided head on with a Renault catering truck on a two-lane highway in flat countryside. The driver of the truck, Jose Maria Rodriguez, suffered a broken ankle, but Barrantes was not wearing a seat belt and was decapitated, aged 61. Barrantes' 25-year-old nephew, Raphael, was in her car and was hospitalised with minor injuries. Barrantes had been involved in a road traffic crash the year before when her car flipped an estimated seven times.

Susan is buried beside her second husband in a vault beneath her home, next to a polo field on the "El Pucara" estate in Tres Lomas, Argentina. Her death came just one year after that of her daughter's former sister-in-law Diana, Princess of Wales, whose funeral she and Sarah had both attended.

== Ancestors ==
Ancestors of Susan Barrantes

8. FitzHerbert Wright
4. Henry FitzHerbert Wright
9. Charlotte Rudolphine von Beckmann
2. FitzHerbert Wright
10. Col. Henry C Fletcher
5. Muriel Harriet Fletcher
11. Lady Harriet Marsham
1. Susan Barrantes
12. Mervyn Wingfield, 7th Viscount Powerscourt
6. Mervyn Wingfield, 8th Viscount Powerscourt
13. Lady Julia Coke
3. Hon. Doreen Wingfield
14. Walter Pleydell-Bouverie
7. Sybil Pleydell-Bouverie
15. Mary Bridgeman-Simpson
