= Richard Wingfield, 6th Viscount Powerscourt =

British peer and Conservative Party politician

The Right Honourable Viscount Powerscourt
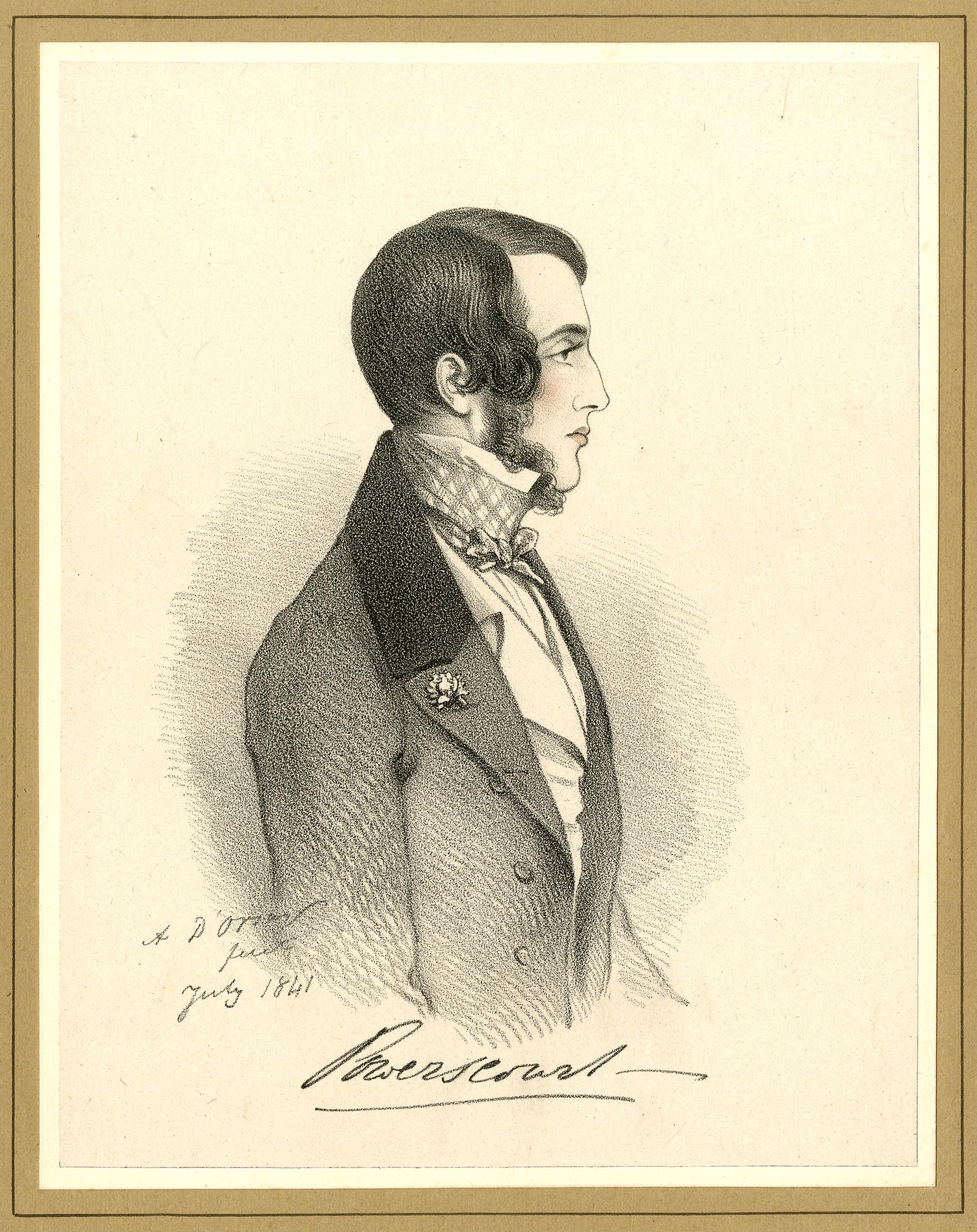
- Predecessor: Richard Wingfield
- Successor: Mervyn Wingfield
- Other titles: Baron Wingfield (UK)
- Born: Richard Wingfield; 18 January 1815
- Died: 11 August 1844 (aged 29)
- Noble family: Wingfield family
- Spouse: Lady Elizabeth Frances Charlotte
- Issue: 3 children, including Mervyn Wingfield, 7th Viscount Powerscourt
- Father: Richard Wingfield, 5th Viscount Powerscourt
- Mother: Lady Frances Theodosia Jocelyn
- Occupation: Peer, Politician

Richard Wingfield, 6th Viscount Powerscourt (18 January 1815 – 11 August 1844), was a British peer and Conservative Party politician.

== Background ==
Powerscourt was the son of Richard Wingfield, 5th Viscount Powerscourt, and Frances Theodosia, daughter of Robert Jocelyn, 2nd Earl of Roden. Through the Wingfield line he was a descendant of the Noble House of Stratford. After the death of his mother in 1820, his father remarried Theodosia Howard, who raised him until he succeeded to his father's title 1823.

== Political career ==
Powerscourt succeeded his father in the viscountcy in 1823. However, as this was an Irish peerage it did not entitle him to a seat in the House of Lords. He was instead elected to the House of Commons for Bath in 1837, a seat he held until 1841. He was president of the Royal Institute of the Architects of Ireland from 1843 to 1844.

== Family ==
Lord Powerscourt married his first cousin Lady Elizabeth Frances Charlotte, daughter of Robert Jocelyn, 3rd Earl of Roden, in 1836. They had three sons. He died in August 1844, aged 29, and was succeeded in the viscountcy by his son Mervyn, a great-great-grandfather of Sarah Ferguson. Lady Powerscourt married Frederick Stewart, 4th Marquess of Londonderry, in 1846.

Parliament of the United Kingdom
| Preceded by Charles Palmer; John Arthur Roebuck | Member of Parliament for Bath; 1837–1841; With: William Heald Ludlow Bruges | Succeeded by Viscount Duncan; John Arthur Roebuck |
Professional and academic associations
| Preceded by William Vesey-FitzGerald, 2nd Baron FitzGerald and Vesey | President of the Royal Institute of the Architects of Ireland; 1843–1844 | Succeeded by Ulick de Burgh, 1st Marquess of Clanricarde |
Peerage of Ireland
| Preceded by Richard Wingfield | Viscount Powerscourt; 1823–1844 | Succeeded by Mervyn Wingfield |
