= Mervyn Niall Wingfield, 10th Viscount Powerscourt =

British baron (1935–2015)

Mervyn Niall Wingfield
- 10th Viscount Powerscourt
- Predecessor: Mervyn Wingfeild
- Successor: Mervyn Anthony Wingfield
- Born: 3 September 1935
- Died: 25 July 2015 (aged 79); Thailand
- Residence: Powerscourt Estate, Enniskerry, County Wicklow.
- Spouses: Anne Wendy Slazenger (m. 1962; div. 1974); Pauline Vann (m. 1978; div. 1995)
- Issue: 2, including Mervyn Anthony Wingfield, 11th Viscount Powerscourt

Mervyn Niall Wingfield (3 September 1935 – 25 July 2015) was the 10th Viscount Powerscourt, and also Baron Powerscourt, of Powerscourt in the County of Wicklow, in the Peerage of the United Kingdom, succeeding his father on 3 April 1973.

== Biography ==
Mervyn Niall Wingfield was born in 1935, son of Mervyn Patrick Wingfield, 9th Viscount Powerscourt (1905–1973) and the former Sheila Claude Beddington. He succeeded his father in the family honours on 3 April 1973. The Powerscourt barony (1886) gave him an automatic seat in the House of Lords until the passing of the House of Lords Act 1999, but according to Hansard he never spoke from the floor of the House.

He married Wendy Anne Pauline Slazenger, daughter of Ralph C.G. Slazenger (heir to the Slazenger sporting goods company) on 15 September 1962, a year after the 9th Viscount had sold the family's Powerscourt Estate to the senior Slazenger. They were divorced in 1974.

On 15 March 1978, he married Pauline Vann, a Californian; they were divorced in 1995. He had two children from his first marriage, Julia Wingfield, and a son, Mervyn Anthony Wingfield, 11th Viscount Powerscourt (born 1963).

He died on 25 July 2015, in Thailand, where he had been living for some time.
