= Richard Wingfield, 4th Viscount Powerscourt =

Irish peer (1762–1809)

The Right Honourable Viscount Powerscourt
- Predecessor: Richard Wingfield
- Successor: Richard Wingfield
- Other titles: Baron Wingfield (UK)
- Born: Richard Wingfield; 1762
- Died: 1809 (aged 46–47)
- Noble family: Wingfield family
- Spouses: Lady Catherine Meade (m. 1789 – 1793); Isabella Brownlow (m. 1796)
- Issue: 6
- Father: Richard Wingfield, 3rd Viscount Powerscourt
- Mother: Lady Amelia Stratford
- Occupation: Peer, Politician

Richard Wingfield, 4th Viscount Powerscourt (29 October 1762 – 19 July 1809) was an Irish nobleman, landowner, and a prominent figure in Anglo-Irish society. As a member of the Irish Parliament he opposed the 1800 Act of Union.

== Biography ==
Richard Wingfield was born on 29 October 1762, the son of Richard Wingfield, 3rd Viscount Powerscourt, and Lady Amelia Stratford. He succeeded his father as the 4th Viscount Powerscourt on 8 August 1788, inheriting extensive lands in County Wicklow and the title of Baron Wingfield of Wingfield, County Wexford.

As the 4th Viscount, Richard sold the family’s Dublin townhouse, Powerscourt House, to the government, which became the office of the Stamp Commissioners following the Act of Union in 1801.

=== Marriage and family ===
Richard Wingfield married twice:

On 30 June 1789, Wingfield married Lady Catherine Meade, the daughter of John Meade, 1st Earl of Clanwilliam, and Theodosia Magill. They had three children:

- Richard Wingfield, 5th Viscount Powerscourt (11 September 1790 – 9 August 1823)
- Hon. John Wingfield (4 September 1791 – 18 May 1811)
- Rev. Hon. Edward Wingfield (20 November 1792 – 6 September 1825)

On 9 February 1796, he married Isabella Brownlow, daughter of Rt. Hon. William Brownlow and Catherine Hall. They had three children:

- Hon. Catherine Wingfield (died 1835)
- Hon. Emily Wingfield (died 20 June 1837)
- Rev. Hon. William Wingfield (21 May 1799 – 13 March 1880)

=== Political career ===
In 1800, Richard Wingfield was one of only four Irish peers who opposed the Act of Union, which sought to unite the Kingdom of Ireland and the Kingdom of Great Britain.

=== Death ===
Richard Wingfield, 4th Viscount Powerscourt, died 19 July 1809. He was succeeded by his son, Richard, as the 5th Viscount.

== See also ==
- Powerscourt Estate

Honorary titles
Preceded by Sir Francis Hutchinson	High Sheriff of Wicklow; 1784	Succeeded by Sir James Stratford Tynte
Peerage of Ireland
Preceded by Richard Wingfield	Viscount Powerscourt; 1788–1809	Succeeded by Richard Wingfield
