= Action of 13 November 1943 =

Submarine engagement of World War II

- Part of World War II, Pacific War
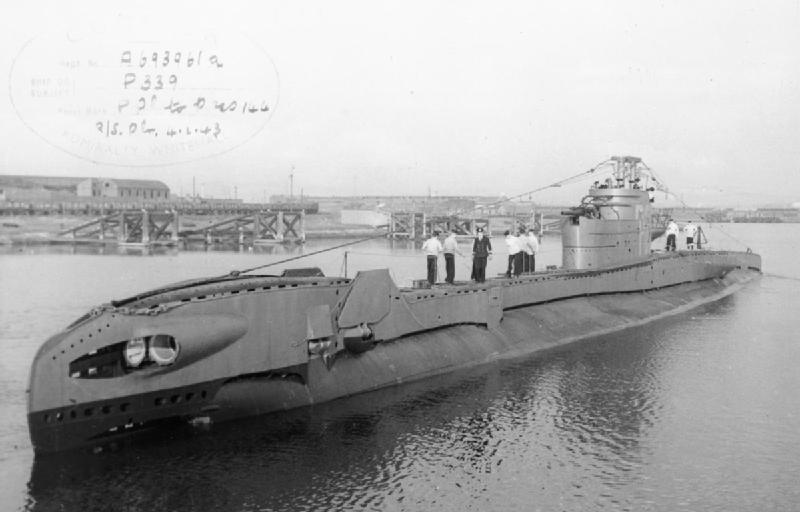
- Submarine HMS Taurus underway
Date	13 November 1943
Location	off Penang, Malaysia, Indian Ocean 5.2833°N 100.0833°E
Result	British victory

Belligerents
United Kingdom	Japan

Commanders and leaders
Mervyn Wingfield	Irie Tatsushi

Strength
Submarine HMS Taurus	Submarine I-34

Casualties and losses
None	I-34 sunk 84 killed

The action of 13 November 1943 was a submarine engagement during the Second World War. It resulted in the sinking of the Japanese Navy's Kaidai Junsen Type B1 submarine I-34 in the Strait of Malacca by the Royal Navy submarine HMS Taurus. I-34 was on a Yanagi Mission, an underwater convoy secretly shipping goods between Japan and their German allies.

== Background ==
The Japanese submarine I-34 (Commander Irie Tatsushi), departed Kure on the first leg of a "Yanagi" mission to Nazi-occupied France. At the time she was the third Japanese submarine to undertake such a mission. Code-breakers at Hut 7 in Bletchley Park deciphered radio traffic transmitted in diplomatic code concerning I-34's mission between Tokyo and Berlin. The message was then relayed to the submarine Taurus (Lieutenant-Commander Mervyn Wingfield) operating from a base in Ceylon.

On the morning of 11 November 1943 I-34 departed Seletar for Penang. The Germans planned to refuel I-34 in the Indian Ocean from a supply ship. I-34 was carrying a cargo of tin, tungsten, raw rubber and opium.

== Action ==
On the morning of 13 November 1943, 30 mi (48 km) off Penang the officer of the watch on Taurus sighted the large submarine I-34 running on the surface at 14 kn (26 km/h; 16 mph) despite a rain squall. Wingfield fired a spread of six torpedoes, one of which hit I-34's starboard side just below her conning tower; she sank rapidly, along with 84 of her crew. Only fourteen survivors managed to escape the wreck and were rescued by a Malay junk.

The following morning, a Japanese submarine chaser CH-20 from Penang attacked Taurus. Due to the shallow water in the region, when Wingfield tried to evade the attack by diving, Taurus' bow became stuck in the soft, muddy seabed. Fortunately, the explosions from a pattern of depth charges dropped over Taurus shook her free. Wingfield went to periscope depth, surfaced and engaged CH-20 with his deck gun, causing severe damage. Thirteen members of the crew were killed, including the captain and another seventeen wounded but before any further action could follow, a Japanese aircraft came into view and forced Wingfield into an emergency dive, which endangered the submarine, which had taken on almost a ton of water. Taurus escaped with only minor damage and managed to make it back to her base at Ceylon.

Following the loss of I-34 the Imperial Japanese Navy diverted all Europe-bound submarines from Penang. I-34 was the first Japanese submarine to be sunk by a Royal Navy submarine.
