= Enniskerry =

Town in County Wicklow, Ireland

Enniskerry Áth na Sceire
- Town
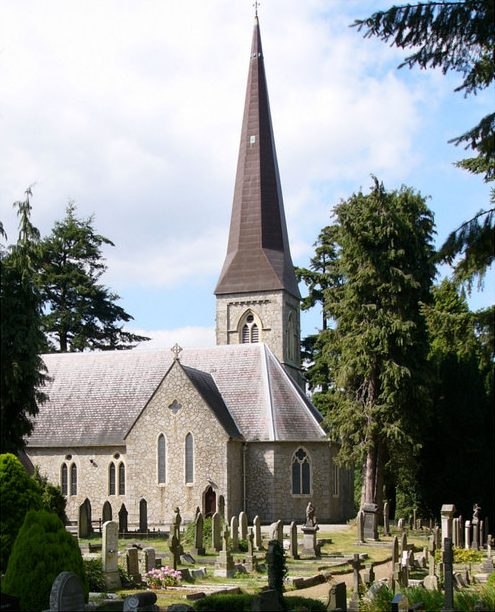
- Saint Patrick's church

- Location in Ireland
- Coordinates: 53°11′34″N 6°10′14″W
- Country: Ireland
- Province: Leinster
- County: County Wicklow
- Elevation: 91 m (299 ft)

Population (2022)
  - Total: 2,008
- Irish Grid Reference: O220174
- Website: www.enniskerry.ie

Enniskerry (historically Annaskerry, from Irish: Áth na Sceire, meaning 'rugged ford') is a town in County Wicklow, Ireland. The population was 2,008 at the 2022 census.

== Location ==
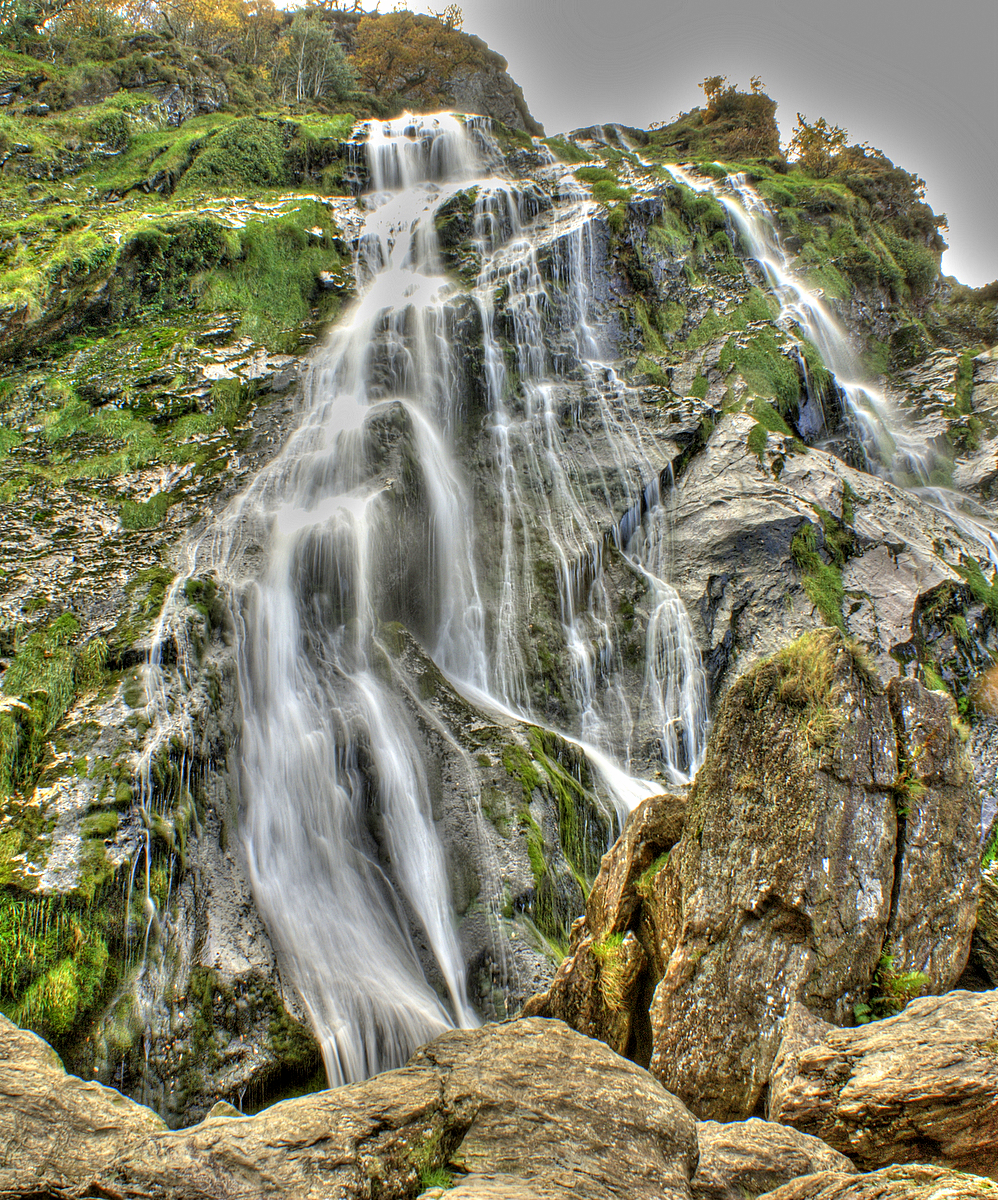
Powerscourt Waterfall.

The town is situated on the Glencullen River in the foothills of the Wicklow Mountains in the east of the island, just 5 minutes south of the Dublin border and some 24 km (15 mi) south of Dublin city centre. The R117 road, colloquially known as "The Twenty-One Bends" connects the town to the main N11 road to Dublin. The 185 Go-Ahead Ireland route connects the village hourly to Bray, the nearest large town. The 44 Dublin Bus route connects the village with Dublin city centre.

== History ==
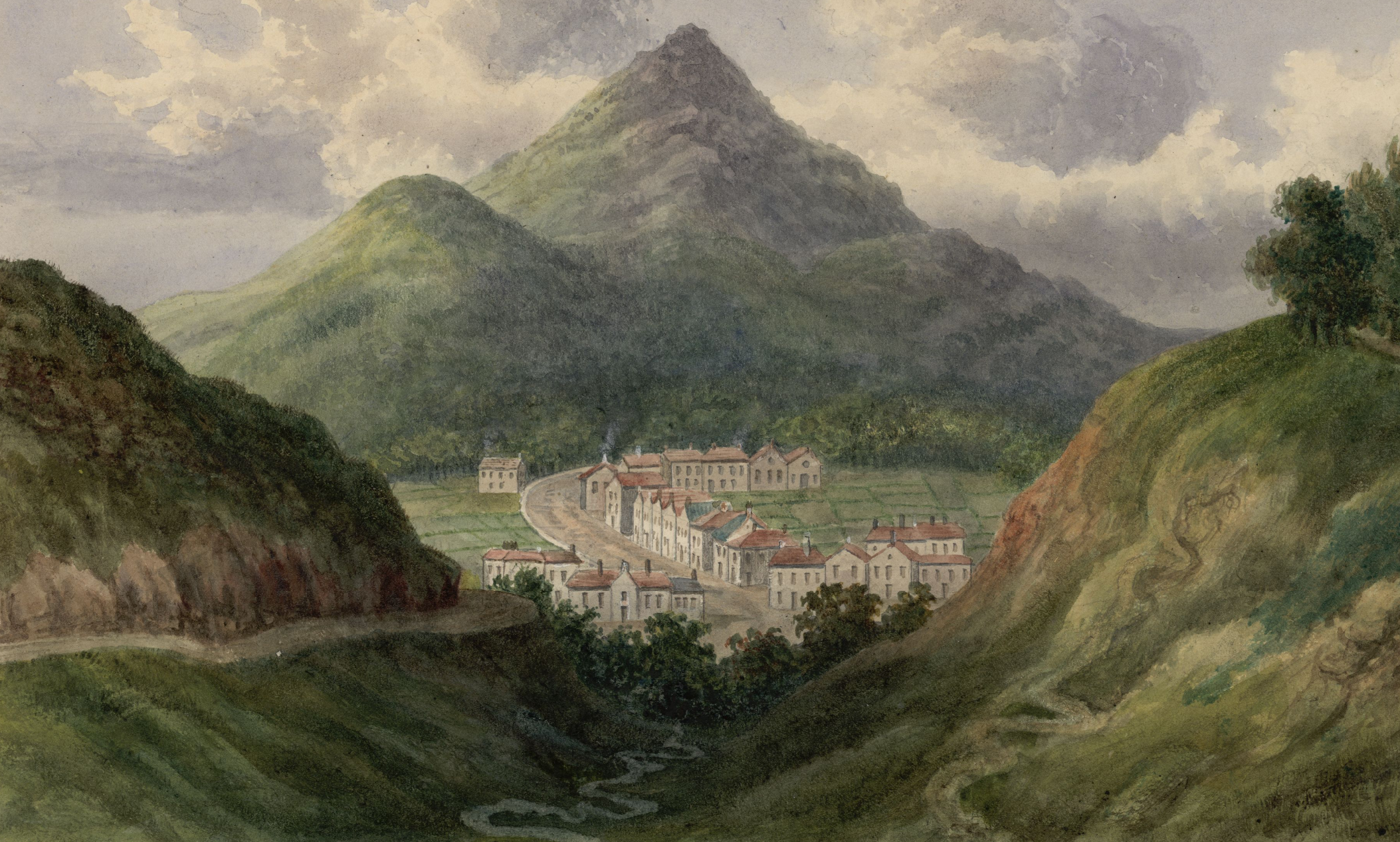
Enniskerry, 1830.

Enniskerry was a small settlement of houses before it became a planned estate village around the 1840s, with the original buildings designed in a neo-Tudor style.

The Protestant population of the village attended church in the grounds of the Powerscourt Demesne until 1859. Mervyn Wingfield, 7th Viscount Powerscourt built a new church, Saint Patrick's, in the village which was completed two years later, in 1861. This coincided with an extensive renovation programme that also established the Italian gardens at Powerscourt. The Viscount Powerscourt claimed the old church following the disestablishment of the Church of Ireland by the Irish Church Act 1869. The consequences were that only those with a right to be buried next to the old church within the Demesne could claim these rights thereafter.

Powerscourt Estate, comprising a large house and gardens today occupying 47 acres (190,000 m^{2}), is located near the town and is a popular visitor attraction. The extensive formal gardens form the grounds of an 18th-century Palladian house, designed by Richard Cassels, which was destroyed by fire in 1974, and lay as a shell until extensive restorations were carried out in 1996. Powerscourt Waterfall in the grounds of the estate, at 121 metres, is the highest waterfall in Ireland.

== Culture ==
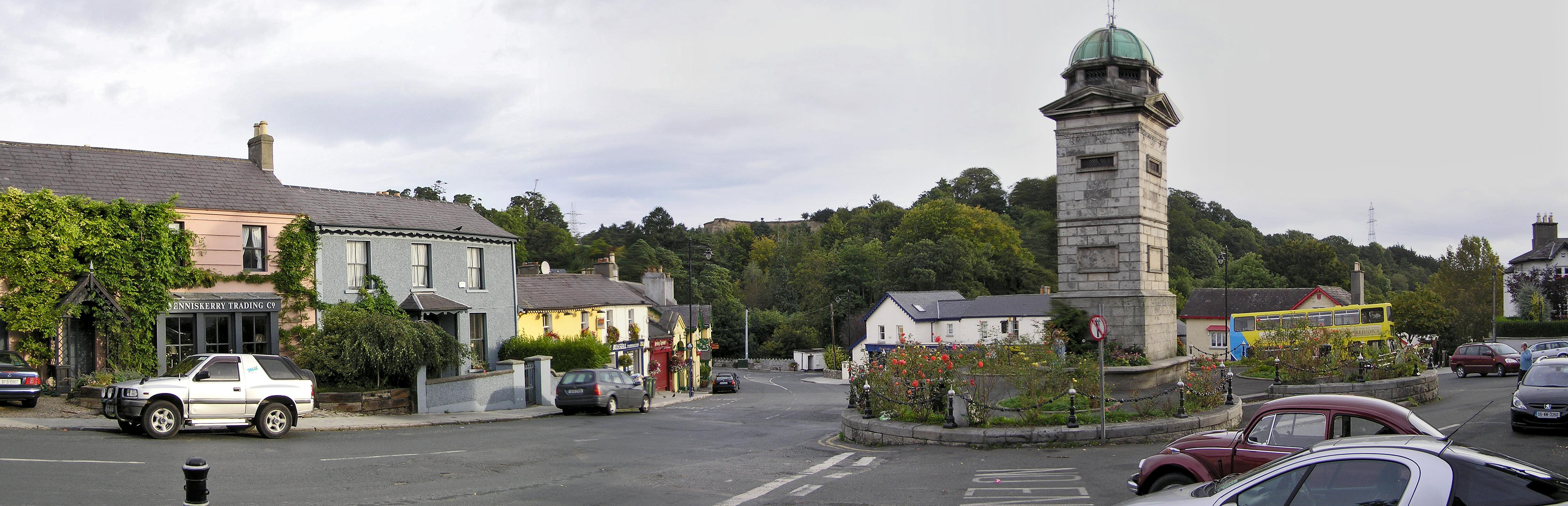
Enniskerry Village Square.

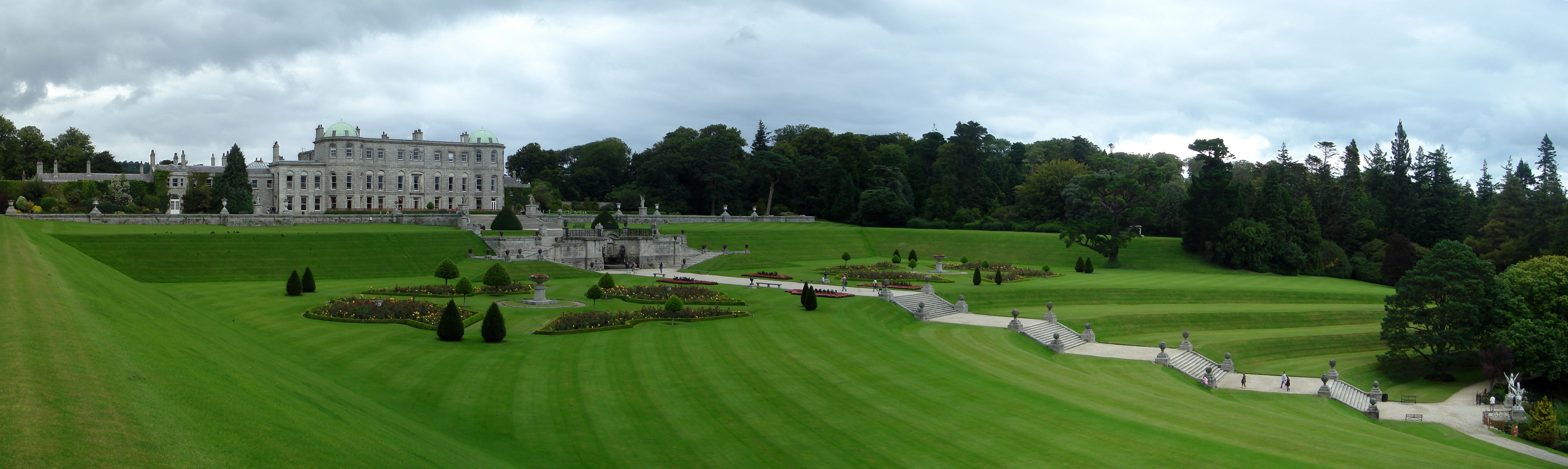
Powerscourt Estate, including its house and Italian gardens.

=== Film ===
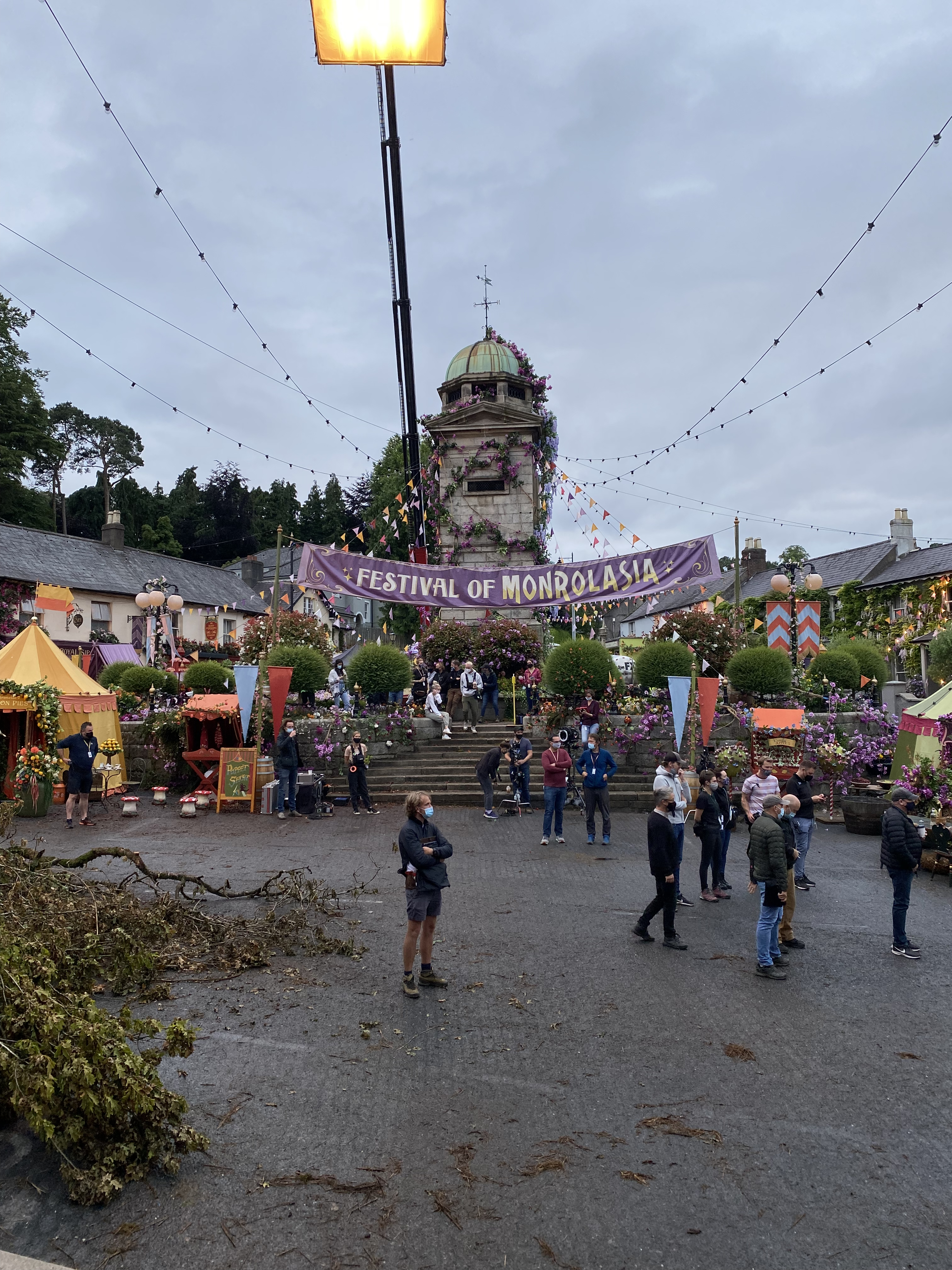
Enniskerry village square transformed into the fictional kingdom of Monrolasia during filming of Disenchanted (2022), summer 2021.

In 1943, scenes for Laurence Olivier’s 1944 film Henry V (an adaptation of William Shakespeare's play of the same name) were shot at the Powerscourt Estate in Enniskerry. The location was selected during World War II for its unspoiled landscape and neutrality, making it suitable to depict the 15th-century Battle of Agincourt. Many scenes were filmed using the Powerscourt Waterfall as a backdrop. The production employed over 800 local extras, many of them members of Ireland’s Local Defence Force, and used more than 160 horses sourced from Irish farms. Taoiseach Éamon de Valera visited the set, observing the battle scenes and speaking with Olivier and the crew. Newspaper coverage at the time described widespread public interest in the filming, with regular reports in The Irish Times and other Irish publications. The project was also supported by the British Ministry of Information as part of a broader wartime cultural diplomacy effort aimed at improving Anglo–Irish relations.

Johnny Nobody (released in 1961) was partly filmed in Enniskerry outside St. Mary's Church.

Leap Year (2010), starring Amy Adams as Anna, includes a scene filmed in Enniskerry village square, with Poppies café renamed “Emilia’s” for the production. P.S. I Love You (2007), which follows Hilary Swank’s character Holly, filmed nearby at a farm outside Enniskerry near Powerscourt Waterfall Road, and also at the Sally Gap in the Wicklow Mountains National Park.

Most recently, Enniskerry gained international attention as the primary filming location for Disney’s Disenchanted (released 2022, the sequel to Enchanted). During summer 2021, the village was completely transformed into a fairytale “Disney village” set, with elaborate props and shopfront facades, drawing thousands of curious locals and visitors to the town. The production altered much of the village’s main square, installing artificial cobblestones, temporary building facades, and decorative elements. Local storefronts were given fictional names such as “The Village Cauldron” and “Beauty and the Book,” while the town’s clock tower was covered with greenery and floral garlands. Disney constructed a temporary large set resembling a Town Hall in the center of the square. The changes attracted significant public interest and increased foot traffic during the filming period.

Ireland's then Minister for Tourism, Culture, Arts, Gaeltacht, Sport and Media, Catherine Martin visited the production, which employed more than 1,000 Irish people across various roles including crew, supporting cast, dancers, and extras. The filming of Disenchanted had a noticeable tourism impact: for instance, taxi requests to Enniskerry spiked by 142% as tourists "flocked" to see the Disney set. Minister Martin remarked that the production had “captivated the public” and expressed confidence that “the high number of domestic tourists visiting the set is just the start of the positive and long-lasting impact that the filming will have on the town of Enniskerry.” She also noted the broader contribution of Ireland’s film crews and locations to the country’s success in attracting international productions, and emphasized the government's commitment to supporting the sector.

=== Television ===
From 1996 to 2001, the village (along with nearby Avoca, County Wicklow) was used as a filming location for the BBC drama Ballykissangel.

On 16 March 2009, NBC’s Today Show broadcast live from Enniskerry’s Powerscourt Gardens as part of a two-day St. Patrick’s Day special. Hosts Meredith Vieira and Al Roker presented segments from County Wicklow and Dublin, including coverage of Irish heritage, tourism, and cultural traditions. During the broadcast, Vieira described the Powerscourt Estate as “like a movie set.”

== Transport ==
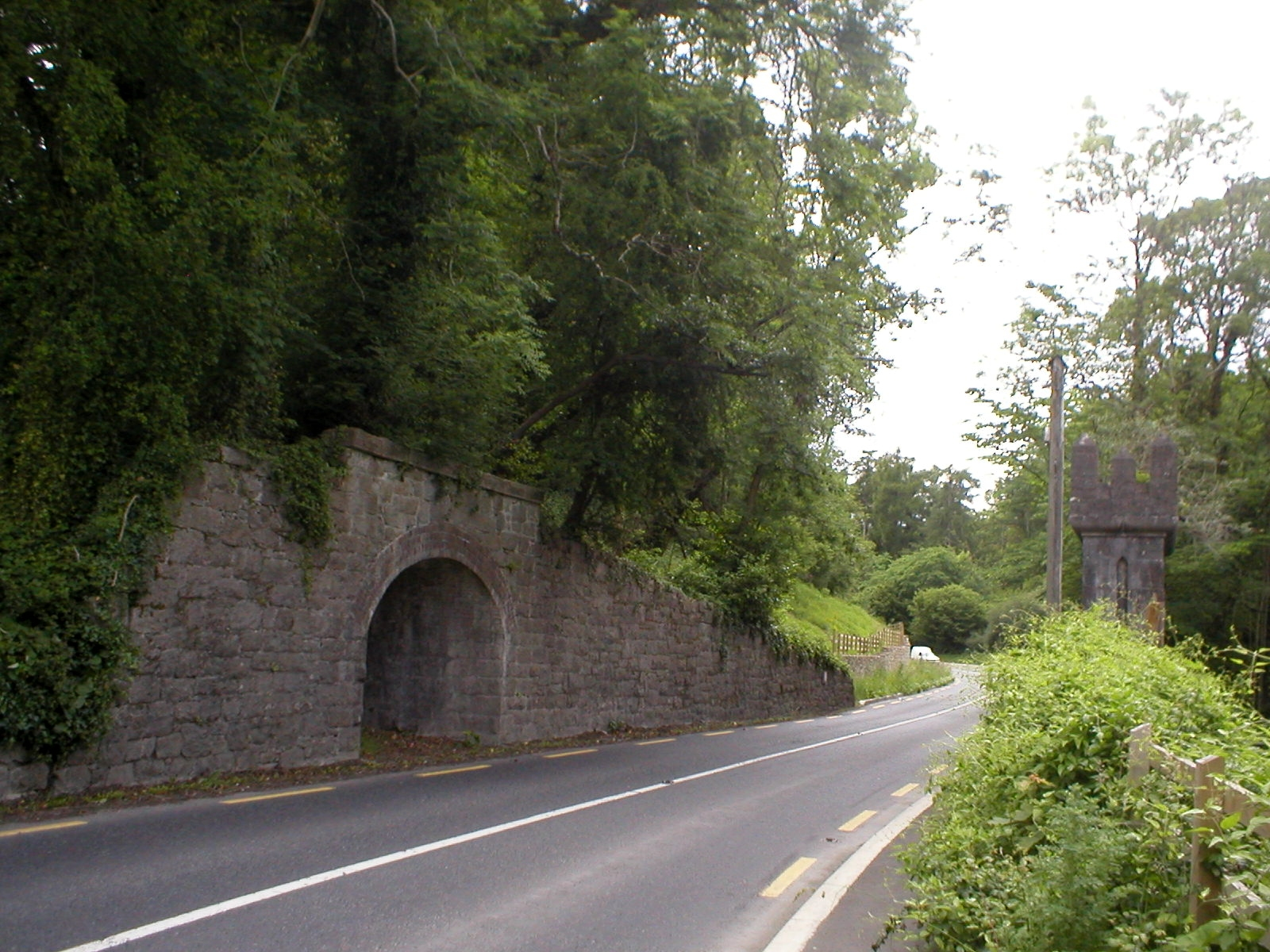
The railway bridge of the failed Bray & Enniskerry Railway

The Bray and Enniskerry Railway was proposed in the 19th century, to link the town to Bray. Some initial work was carried out, including building a bridge to carry the railway over Dublin Corporation's Vartry watermain. Wicklow County Council recently removed much of the railway embankment in road widening, but left the bridge, which is directly opposite the ornate bridge carrying the watermain over the Cookstown River, a tributary of the River Dargle. The plan ran into financial difficulties, and the rails were lifted and sold off.

The 44 Bus to DCU via Dundrum and St. Stephen's Green now has a terminus in Enniskerry (operated by Dublin Bus), whilst the L15 Bus to Bray goes through the village (operated by Go-Ahead Ireland).

== Sports ==
There are two football clubs located in the village; Enniskerry Football Club and Enniskerry Youth Club.

Enniskerry Football Club was founded in the early 1970s as Enniskerry Schoolboys Football Club. The club, which now fields teams of boys and girls, is based in the Bog Meadow. Enniskerry FC participates in the Metropolitan Girls League with all-girls teams, the Wicklow Schoolboys/Girls Soccer League for their all-boys teams and the Athletic Union League for the men's team.

Enniskerry Youth Club have several teams playing at adult and youth level.

There is also a Gaelic football club and Enniskerry Boxing Club located at St Mary's GAA grounds.

== Religion ==
Strong ecumenical links have been forged over the years between the Roman Catholic parish of St Mary and the Church of Ireland parish of St Patrick, Powerscourt, both in the village of Enniskerry. For Volkstrauertag 2022, the Roman Catholic priest Bernard Kennedy led his congregation in "an Ecumenical prayer for peace with interfaith elements", joining Lutheran, Catholic and Jewish communities in Enniskerry. Other clergymen have previously spoken out about the strong ties that exist between Christian communities in the area.

== People ==
- Ina Boyle, 20th century composer, was born locally
- Chris de Burgh, singer and songwriter
- Rosanna Davison, former Miss World.
- Daina Moorehouse, Olympic boxer, fights out of Enniskerry Boxing Club
- Rick Savage, bassist with Def Leppard, lived in the town.
- Daniel Whelan, American football player for the Green Bay Packers

== See also ==
- Powerscourt Estate
- Powerscourt Waterfall
- List of towns and villages in Ireland
