= Sheila Wingfield =

Irish poet

Sheila, Viscountess Powerscourt
- Born: Sheila Claude Beddington; 23 May 1906; Hampshire, England
- Died: 8 January 1992 (aged 85); County Dublin, Ireland
- Occupations: Writer, poet
- Spouse: Mervyn Patrick Wingfield, 9th Viscount Powerscourt
- Children: Grania Langrishe; Mervyn Wingfield; Guy Wingfield
- Writing career
- Genre: Imagist Movement

The Rt Hon. Sheila Wingfield, Viscountess Powerscourt (née Sheila Claude Beddington; 23 May 1906 – 8 January 1992), was an Anglo-Irish poet.

== Life and work ==
Lady Powerscourt was born in Hampshire and attended the Roedean School. She attended art school in Paris. She was the daughter of Major Claude Beddington and Frances Ethel (née Homan-Mulock). Ethel was the daughter of a Protestant family from County Offaly, whose homes included the Bellair and Ballycumber estates, where Lady Powerscourt spent most of her childhood summer holidays. Her mother was also the author of All That I Have Met. Lady Powerscourt later inherited the Bellair estate from her aunt. Her mother's uncle was Alfred Austin, Poet Laureate.

Her father was from a Jewish family who had changed the surname from Moses. They had earned their wealth in the tobacco trade. Her parents did not approve of her interest in writing so she hid her interest. Her father went so far as to forbid her to read. She also hid her Jewish background from those around her, again at her father's insistence. Her cousins included the Jewish literary figures Violet Schiff and Ada Leverson, and her grandfather was born Alfred Henry Moses.

In 1932 she married The Hon. Mervyn Patrick Wingfield (1905–1973), later The 9th Viscount Powerscourt, in Jerusalem. They had three children, a daughter and two sons: Grania Langrishe, Mervyn and Guy Wingfield.

Her poems were first published in The Dublin Magazine of 1937. Although initially supportive, her husband later requested her not to be involved in the literary circle in Ireland. During her life she produced eight collections of verse and three memoirs of Irish life, although she is not well known in Ireland. This is despite the admiration of Elizabeth Bowen, W. B. Yeats, John Betjeman, T. S. Eliot and James Stephens. However, she and Yeats had a falling out when she used his praise from a private letter on the cover of her first publication. She suffered her first breakdown during the production of that publication. Lady Powerscourt wanted to be a respected poet. She suffered from addictions to alcohol, morphine and cocaine. Her drug use had started during her seasons in London.

The Second World War had a huge impact on the family. Her husband Mervyn served in the war and was captured by the Germans in Italy. When he came home his health had been compromised and he suffered from shell shock. Sheila (she later became Lady Powerscourt, in March 1947) had taken the family to Bermuda. They returned home when Mervyn did. Her best work was written in response to the war, Beat Drum, Beat Heart (1946). Her husband came into his inheritance of the Powerscourt Estate in March 1947, when he succeeded as The 9th Viscount Powerscourt.

She became the leader of Irish Girl Guides and helped catalogue the Chester Beatty Library. Her marriage never recovered from the impact of the war, however. In 1963 she left her husband and, as a result of the financial impact, the family sold Powerscourt. Lady Powerscourt lived after that in hotels in Bermuda, London, Dublin and Switzerland. She finally died in a home near Dublin.

In the 1950s, Lady Powerscourt won the Poetry Society Book Choice.

The Sheila Wingfield Papers are being kept in the National Library of Ireland and Houghton Library, Harvard University.

== Bibliography ==
=== Collections ===
- Poems (London: Cresset Press, 1938)
- Beat Drum, Beat Heart (London: Cresset Press, 1946)
- A Cloud Across the Sun (London: Cresset Press, 1949)
- A Kite’s Dinner: Poems 1938–54 (London: Cresset Press, 1954)
- The Leaves Darken (London: Weidenfeld & Nicolson, 1964)
- Admissions: Poems 1974–1977 (Dublin: Dolmen Press; London: John Calder, 1977)
- Her Storms: Selected Poems 1938–1977, with a preface by G. S. Fraser (Dublin: Dolmen Press, 1977)
- Collected Poems: 1938–1983, preface by G. S. Fraser (London: Enitharmon Press; NY: Hill & Wang, 1983)
- Ladder to the Loft (London: Cygnet Press, 1987)

=== Autobiography and memoir ===
- Real People, with a foreword by John Betjeman (London: Cresset Press 1952)
- Sun Too Fast (London: Bles [1973], 1974)
