= Viscount Powerscourt =

Title in the peerage of Ireland

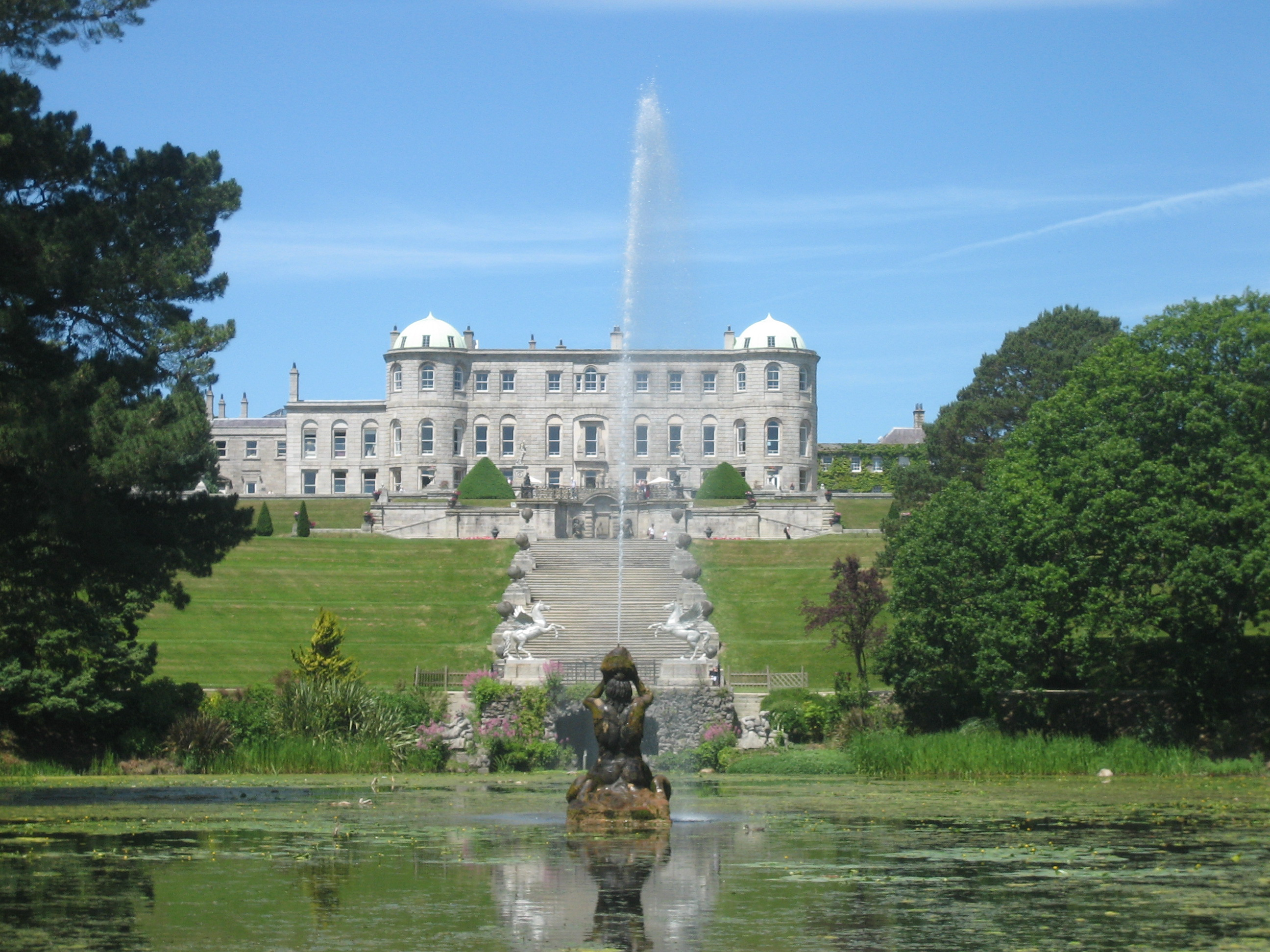
Powerscourt House

Viscount Powerscourt (/ˈpɔːrzkɔːrt/ PORZ-kort) is a title that has been created three times in the Peerage of Ireland, each time for members of the Wingfield family. It was created first in 1618 for the Chief Governor of Ireland, Richard Wingfield. However, this creation became extinct on his death in 1634. It was created a second time in 1665 for Folliott Wingfield. He was the great-great-grandson of George Wingfield, uncle of the first Viscount of the 1618 creation. However, the 1665 creation also became extinct on the death of its first holder in 1717.

It was created for a third time in 1744 for Richard Wingfield, along with title of Baron Wingfield, of Wingfield in the County of Wexford. He was the grandson of Lewis Wingfield, uncle of the first Viscount of the 1665 creation. Richard Wingfield had earlier represented Boyle in the Irish House of Commons. His eldest son, the second Viscount, represented Stockbridge in the British House of Commons. He was succeeded by his younger brother, the third Viscount, who married into the House of Stratford (from which all latter holders of the Powerscourt Viscountcy descend). The latter's grandson, the fifth Viscount, sat in the House of Lords as an Irish representative peer from 1821 to 1823. His son, the sixth Viscount, sat as a Member of Parliament for Bath. On his death the titles passed to his son, the seventh Viscount, who was an Irish Representative Peer from 1865 to 1885. The latter year he was created Baron Powerscourt, of Powerscourt in the County of Wicklow, in the Peerage of the United Kingdom. This peerage gave him and his descendants an automatic seat in the House of Lords until the passing of the House of Lords Act 1999. His son, the eighth Viscount, served as Lord Lieutenant of County Wicklow and was a member of the short-lived Senate of Southern Ireland. As of 2015 the titles are held by his great-grandson, the eleventh Viscount, who succeeded his father in 2015.

The family seat was the once vast Powerscourt House, near Enniskerry, County Wicklow.

== Viscounts Powerscourt, First Creation (1618) ==
- Richard Wingfield, 1st Viscount Powerscourt (1550–1634)

== Viscounts Powerscourt, Second Creation (1665) ==
- Folliott Wingfield, 1st Viscount Powerscourt (1642–1717)

== Viscounts Powerscourt, Third Creation (1744) ==
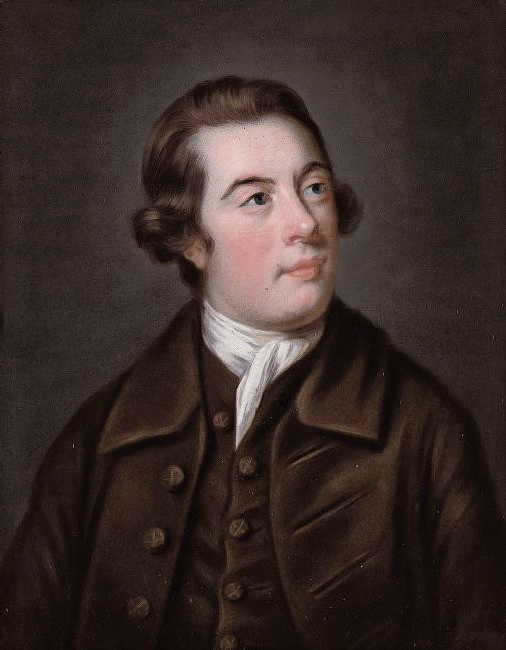
Edward, 2nd Viscount Powerscourt

- Richard Wingfield, 1st Viscount Powerscourt (1697–1751)
- Edward Wingfield, 2nd Viscount Powerscourt (1729–1764)
- Richard Wingfield, 3rd Viscount Powerscourt (1730–1788)
- Richard Wingfield, 4th Viscount Powerscourt (1762–1809)
- Richard Wingfield, 5th Viscount Powerscourt (1790–1823)
- Richard Wingfield, 6th Viscount Powerscourt (1815–1844)
- Mervyn Wingfield, 7th Viscount Powerscourt (1836–1904)
- Mervyn Richard Wingfield, 8th Viscount Powerscourt (1880–1947)
- Mervyn Patrick Wingfield, 9th Viscount Powerscourt (1905–1973)
- Mervyn Niall Wingfield, 10th Viscount Powerscourt (1935–2015)
- Mervyn Anthony Wingfield, 11th Viscount Powerscourt (born 1963)

The heir presumptive to the viscountcy is the current holder's fifth cousin once removed: Richard David Noel Wingfield (born 1966), a great-great-great-grandson of the Rev. Hon. Edward Wingfield (1792–1874), the third son of the fourth Viscount. He has a son, Dylan.

There is no heir to the barony created in 1885.

Line of succession (simplified)
- Richard Wingfield, 3rd Viscount Powerscourt (1730–1788)
  - Richard Wingfield, 4th Viscount Powerscourt (1762–1809)
    - Richard Wingfield, 5th Viscount Powerscourt (1790–1823)
      - Richard Wingfield, 6th Viscount Powerscourt (1815–1844)
        - Mervyn Wingfield, 7th Viscount Powerscourt (1836–1904)
          - Mervyn Richard Wingfield, 8th Viscount Powerscourt (1880–1947)
            - Mervyn Patrick Wingfield, 9th Viscount Powerscourt (1905–1973)
              - Mervyn Niall Wingfield, 10th Viscount Powerscourt (1935-2015)
                - Mervyn Anthony Wingfield, 11th Viscount Powerscourt (born 1963)
    - Reverend Hon. Edward Wingfield (1792–1874)
      - Richard Robert Wingfield (1820–1896)
        - Richard William Wingfield (1849–1918)
          - Noel Sparks Wingfield (1907–1992)
            - Patrick Noel Wingfield (1934–2018)
              - (1) Richard David Noel Wingfield (born 1966)
                - (2) Dylan Patrick Wingfield (b. 1999)
              - (3) Jeremy James Wingfield (born 1974)
      - George John Wingfield (1822–1860)
        - Sir Anthony Henry Wingfield (1857–1952)
          - Anthony Edward Foulis Wingfield (1892–1946)
            - Gervase Christopher Brinsmade Wingfield (1931–1964)
              - male issue in succession
      - Edward ffolliott Wingfield (1823–1865)
        - Edward Rhys Wingfield (1849–1901)
          - Mervyn Edward George Rhys Wingfield (1872–1952)
            - Charles Talbot Rhys Wingfield (1924–2007)
              - male issue in succession
            - other male issue in succession
          - William Jocelyn Rhys Wingfield (1873–1942)
            - William Thomas Rhys Wingfield (1907–1976)
              - male issue in succession
              - Robert Taylor Rhys Wingfield (1940–1999)
                - male issue in succession
              - other male issue in succession
          - Cecil John Talbot Rhys Wingfield (1881–1915)
            - Edward William Rhys Wingfield (1905–1984)
              - male issue in succession
    - Rev. Hon. William Wingfield (1799–1880)
      - Richard Thomas Wingfield (1835–1870)
        - Rev. William Edward Wingfield (1867–1927)
          - John Anthony David Wingfield (1905–1983)
            - male issue in succession
          - Mervyn Robert George Wingfield (1911–2005)
            - male issue in succession
  - Hon. John Wingfield-Stratford (1772–1850)
    - John Wingfield-Stratford (1810–1881)
      - Francis Mervyn Wingfield-Stratford (1864–1932)
        - Mervyn Verner Wingfield-Stratford (1907–1982)
          - male issue in succession

== Ancestry ==
Ancestors of Viscount Powerscourt

8. Mervyn Wingfield, 7th Viscount Powerscourt
4. Mervyn Wingfield, 8th Viscount Powerscourt
9. Lady Julia Coke
2. Mervyn Patrick Wingfield, 9th Viscount Powerscourt
10. Walter Pleydell-Bouverie
5. Sybil Pleydell-Bouverie
11. Mary Bridgeman-Simpson
1. Mervyn Wingfield, 10th Viscount Powerscourt
6. Claude Beddington
3. Sheila Beddington
14. Francis Homan-Mulock
7. Frances Homan-Mulock
15. Ethel Braddon
