= Theodosia Wingfield =

Irish evangelical religious writer

- Born: Theodosia Anne Howard; 1800; County Wicklow, Ireland
- Died: 31 December 1836 (aged 36); Dublin
- Occupation: evangelical religious writer
- Title: Viscountess Powerscourt

Theodosia Wingfield, Viscountess Powerscourt (1800 – 31 December 1836) was an Irish evangelical religious writer.

== Life ==
Theodosia Wingfield was born Theodosia Anne Howard in 1800 in County Wicklow. Her parents were the gentleman landowner, the Honourable Hugh Howard, and Catherine (née Bligh). Her family were one of a small number of closely related families in the gentry of County Wicklow, who all shared a religious piety around the early 1800s. Wingfield would have seen and met the Reverend Robert Daly as a child, when he was the rector of Powerscourt Estate. Wingfield appears to have been deeply affected by the death of the first wife of Richard Wingfield, 5th Viscount Powerscourt, her cousin Francis Theodosia Bligh, at age 25 in 1820, inspiring an intense spirituality. In her earliest printed letters from 1821, she agonises over the issues raised in sermons, and feels guilt over not praying regularly enough. She married Richard Wingfield in June 1822. He died in August 1823. For the rest of her life, Wingfield earned the title "good Lady Powerscourt", by engaging in letter-writing and convening religious meetings in her house.

Her letters from the 1820s detail her feelings of feeling "unworthy" and needing to suffer more like Christ. She was concerned by the calls for Catholic emancipation, but found solace in the growing numbers of Anglicans in England, Scotland and Europe who held similar beliefs to hers. Wingfield attended the first meetings of the Albury Prophetic Conference in London, and was a frequent attendee at lectures by Edward Irving. Inspired by this, she organised her own conferences on the meaning of prophecy at Powerscourt from 1827. From the late 1820s she had developed a strong interest in Christ's second coming and charismatic manifestations. She travelled to Brussels and Paris in 1829 and 1830 to meet evangelical preachers, and frequently visited London. She died on 31 December 1836 in Dublin, and is buried at Powerscourt.

Through her writings, meetings, and connections within the community of evangelical Christians in Ireland, Wingfield was an influential figure throughout the 1820s and 1830s. She became famous for her piety after her death after the publication of some of her letters and papers in 1838 by Robert Daly. Daly may have edited her letters to remove elements which did not fit with his beliefs, in particular that she supported the secession of some Anglicans from the Church of Ireland.
