= Héctor Barrantes =

Polo player, horse breeder

- Born: Héctor Eduardo Barrantes Sansoni; 9 March 1939; Trenque Lauquen, Argentina
- Died: 10 August 1990 (aged 51); Buenos Aires, Argentina
- Occupation: Polo player
- Spouse: Susan Barrantes (m. 1975)
- Relatives: Sarah, Duchess of York (stepdaughter)

Héctor Eduardo Barrantes Sansoni (9 March 1939 - 10 August 1990) was an Argentine polo player. He was the stepfather of Sarah, Duchess of York.

== Biography ==
=== Early life ===
He was a member of the patrician Figueroa family, and was born on 9 March 1939 in Argentina. He was the son of Martín Barrantes Figueroa and Clelia Josefina Sansoni Pais, both born in Salta, Argentina. The Figueroa family descended directly from Francisco de Toledo y Figueroa (10 July 1515 – 15 August 1582) who was an aristocrat and soldier of the Kingdom of Spain and the fifth Viceroy of Peru.

=== Career ===
He started playing polo at the age of fifteen. In 1967, he moved to England to play polo with Samuel Vestey, 3rd Baron Vestey in Stowell Park. In 1983, he was barred from the international polo field for a year for a bout of anger.

Héctor Barrantes enlisted in the Argentine Army during the Falklands War of 1982 between Argentina and the United Kingdom, but did not fight.

Later, he bred polo ponies on his 1,000-acre (400 ha) ranch in Guaminí, 335 miles (540 km) southwest of Buenos Aires. His polo pony called Luna, which he bred on his ranch, won the Lady Townley Cup in 1989 and 1990, ridden by Gonzalo Pieres.

=== Personal life ===
His first wife died in a car crash. In 1974, he started an affair with Susan Ferguson, the mother of Sarah Ferguson, who divorced her husband Major Ronald Ferguson and left her two daughters in England. In 1975, they married in a civil ceremony in Argentina. They resided on a polo ranch in Guaminí, Argentina.

=== Death ===
He died of lymphatic cancer on 10 August 1990. He was buried, initially, in the Parque Jardín de Paz cemetery in Pilar, Buenos Aires. Later he was reinterred in a vault under his home and next to a polo field on his "El Pucará" estate where, in 1998, his widow Susan was buried following her death, from a car crash.

== Honours ==
A major polo trophy in Argentina has been named in Barrantes's honour, the Copa Héctor Barrantes.
