= Japanese submarine I-34 =

Type B1 submarine of the Imperial Japanese Navy

History

Japan
- Name: I-34
- Builder: Sasebo Naval Arsenal
- Laid down: January 1, 1941
- Launched: September 24, 1941
- Commissioned: August 31, 1942
- Stricken: January 1944
- Fate: Sunk, November 13, 1943

Service record
- Part of: Kure Submarine Squadron; Submarine Squadron 1; Submarine Squadron 8
- Commanders: Tonozuka Kinzo; August 31, 1942 – March 20, 1943; Irie Tatsuhi; March 20, 1943 – November 13, 1943

General characteristics
- Class & type: Type B1 submarine
- Displacement: 2,589 long tons surfaced; 3,654 long tons submerged
- Length: 108.7 m (356 ft 8 in) (overall)
- Beam: 9.3 m (30 ft 6 in)
- Draught: 5.14 m (16 ft 10 in)
- Propulsion: 2 diesels: 12,400 hp (9,200 kW); Electric motors: 2,000 hp (1,500 kW)
- Speed: 23.5 knots (43.5 km/h) surfaced; 8 knots (15 km/h) submerged
- Range: 14,000 nautical miles (26,000 km; 16,000 mi) at 16 knots (30 km/h)
- Endurance: 90 days
- Test depth: 100 m (330 ft)
- Complement: 101 officers and men
- Armament: 6 × 533 mm torpedo tubes forward; 1 × 14 cm/40 11th Year Type naval gun (17 torpedoes)
- Aircraft carried: one seaplane (Yokosuka E14Y1 Glen)

I-34 was a Kaidai Junsen Type B1 submarine of the Imperial Japanese Navy. During World War II, while on a Yanagi mission between Japan and Germany carrying strategic raw materials and information, she was sunk by the British submarine HMS Taurus using Ultra intelligence.

== Service history ==
=== Commissioning ===
Her keel was laid down at the Sasebo Dockyard on 1 January 1941; she was launched on 24 September. She was commissioned and assigned to the Kure Naval District on 31 August 1942, with Commander Tonozuka Kinzo in command. Commander Tatsushi Irie (入江達) took command in March 1943. During early 1943, she took part in supply missions and the eventual evacuation of the garrison of Kiska in the Aleutian Islands. On 15 September 1943, she was assigned to a Yanagi (exchange) mission to Lorient, France. She arrived in Singapore on 22 October 1943 to take on passengers and cargo for her mission. I-34 loaded a cargo of raw rubber, tungsten, tin, quinine, medicinal opium and samples of Japanese weapons. She departed for Penang to load passengers on 11 November 1943. Due to a delay in loading the cargo, her passengers opted to meet her at Penang. Unknown to Commander Irie or the crew, her movements were being tracked by Ultra intelligence, and a British submarine was sent to sink her.

=== Sinking ===
She was spotted running on the surface in a rain squall by HMS Taurus, on 13 November 1943 in the Malacca Straits, 30 nautical miles (56 km) off the coast of Penang at 07:30. Taurus fired a salvo of six torpedoes of which one struck I-34 below the conning tower, she sank in 100 feet (30 m) of water at 05°17′N 100°05′E. Of her 94 crew, only 14 survived to be picked up by a local junk. Following the loss of I-34, the IJN rerouted all Europe-bound submarines away from Penang.

I-34 was removed from the Imperial Japanese Navy list in January 1944. Her wreck was salvaged on 4 December 1962 by the Singaporean Great Eastern Salvage Company. Over 50 bodies were found in the wreck and were cremated in a specially erected shrine in Penang. Her bell is on display at the local Mariners Club and some of the recovered documents ("code books") are on display at the Royal Navy Submarine Museum in Gosport.

== Bibliography ==
- HIJMS I 34
- Milanovich, Kathrin (2021). "The IJN Submarines of the I 15 Class". In Jordan, John (ed.). Warship 2021. Oxford, UK: Osprey Publishing. pp. 29–43. ISBN 978-1-4728-4779-9.
