= Richard Wingfield, 5th Viscount Powerscourt =

Anglo-Irish peer

The Right Honourable Viscount Powerscourt
- Predecessor: Richard Wingfield
- Successor: Richard Wingfield
- Other titles: Baron Wingfield (UK)
- Born: Richard Wingfield; 11 September 1790
- Died: 9 August 1823 (aged 32)
- Noble family: Wingfield family
- Spouse: Lady Frances Theodosia Jocelyn
- Issue: 3
- Father: Richard Wingfield, 4th Viscount Powerscourt
- Mother: Lady Catherine Meade
- Occupation: Peer, Politician

Richard Wingfield, 5th Viscount Powerscourt (11 September 1790 – 9 August 1823) was an Anglo-Irish peer.

He was the son of Richard Wingfield, 4th Viscount Powerscourt and Lady Catherine Meade, daughter of John Meade, 1st Earl of Clanwilliam. On 19 July 1809 he succeeded to his father's titles in the Peerage of Ireland. In 1821, he was elected as an Irish representative peer and took his seat in the House of Lords. In August 1821 Powerscourt hosted George IV at his family home, Powerscourt House, in County Wicklow. His time in the Lords was ended by his premature death in 1823.

Powerscourt married twice; firstly to Lady Frances Theodosia Jocelyn, daughter of Robert Jocelyn, 2nd Earl of Roden and Frances Theodosia Bligh, on 6 February 1813. Following his first wife's death he married Theodosia Howard, daughter of Hon. Hugh Howard and Catherine Bligh, in August 1822. He was succeeded in his titles by his son, Richard.

Political offices
Preceded by The Marquess of Londonderry	Representative peer for Ireland; 1821–1823	Succeeded by The Viscount Gort
Peerage of Ireland
Preceded by Richard Wingfield	Viscount Powerscourt; 1809–1923	Succeeded by Richard Wingfield
