= HMS Taurus (P339) =

Submarine of the Royal Navy

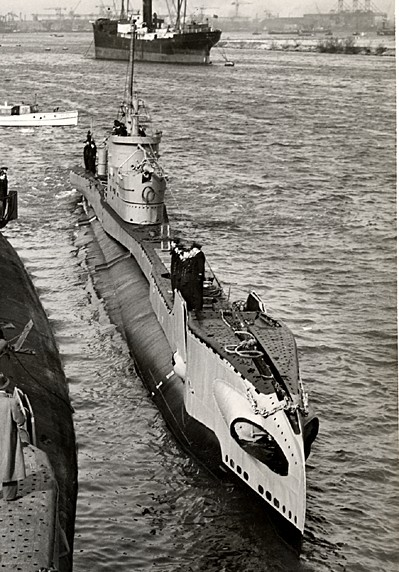
- HNLMS Dolfijn, ex HMS Taurus

History

United Kingdom
- Name: HMS Taurus
- Builder: Vickers-Armstrongs, Barrow
- Laid down: 30 September 1941
- Launched: 27 June 1942
- Commissioned: 3 November 1942
- Fate: Transferred to the Royal Netherlands Navy on 4 June 1948
- Badge

Netherlands
- Name: HNLMS Dolfijn
- Commissioned: 4 June 1948
- Decommissioned: 7 December 1953
- Fate: Returned to Royal Navy on 7 December 1953

United Kingdom
- Name: HMS Taurus
- Recommissioned: 8 December 1953
- Fate: Scrapped April 1960

General characteristics
- Class & type: T-class submarine
- Displacement: 1,290 tons surfaced; 1,560 tons submerged
- Length: 276 ft 6 in (84.28 m)
- Beam: 25 ft 6 in (7.77 m)
- Draught: 12 ft 9 in (3.89 m) forward; 14 ft 7 in (4.45 m) aft
- Propulsion: Two shafts; Twin diesel engines 2,500 hp (1.86 MW) each; Twin electric motors 1,450 hp (1.08 MW) each
- Speed: 15.5 knots (28.7 km/h) surfaced; 9 knots (20 km/h) submerged
- Range: 4,500 nautical miles at 11 knots (8,330 km at 20 km/h) surfaced
- Test depth: 300 ft (91 m) max
- Complement: 61
- Armament: 6 internal forward-facing 21-inch (533 mm) torpedo tubes; 2 external forward-facing torpedo tubes; 2 external amidships rear-facing torpedo tubes; 1 external rear-facing torpedo tubes; 6 reload torpedoes; 1 x 4-inch (102 mm) deck gun; 3 anti aircraft machine guns

HMS Taurus was a Second World War T-class submarine, built by Vickers-Armstrongs, Barrow.

== Career ==
=== As HMS Taurus ===
The submarine was laid down on 30 September 1941, and launched on 27 June 1942. Taurus was commissioned on 3 November 1942 with the pennant number P339. She served in the Mediterranean and the Pacific Far East during the Second World War. Whilst serving in the Mediterranean, she sank the small French merchant Clairette, the Spanish merchant Bartolo, the Italian merchant Derna, the French tug Ghrib and two barges, the Portuguese Santa Irene , the small Italian tanker Alcione C., the Italian sailing vessel Luigi, twenty eight Greek sailing vessels, and the small Greek ship Romano. She also damaged a further two sailing ships and the Greek merchant Konstantinos Louloudis. It was during this period off the Greek coast she had the unusual distinction of engaging a Bulgarian cavalry unit while bombarding a small port.

She was transferred to the Far East to operate against the Japanese, where she sank the Japanese submarine I-34, two Japanese tugboats and a barge and the Japanese salvage vessel Hokuan I-Go. She also laid a number of mines, which damaged the Japanese submarine I-37 and sank the Japanese transport ship Kasumi Maru.

Having survived the war, Taurus was transferred to the Royal Netherlands Navy on 4 June 1948 and commissioned into service the same day. She was renamed Dolfijn.

=== As HNLMS Dolfijn ===
Dolfijn had a relatively quiet career, making a number of cruises before being decommissioned on 7 November 1953 and transferred back to the Royal Navy.

=== As HMS Taurus again ===
Dolfijn was recommissioned into the Royal Navy on 8 December 1953 and her name returned to the original HMS Taurus. She served for another seven years before being sold to be broken up for scrap in April 1960.

== Publications ==
- Colledge, J. J.; Warlow, Ben (2006) [1969]. Ships of the Royal Navy: The Complete Record of All Fighting Ships of the Royal Navy from the 15th Century to the Present (3rd Rev ed.). London: Chatham Publishing. ISBN 978-1-86176-281-8. OCLC 67375475.
- Hutchinson, Robert (2001). Jane's Submarines: War Beneath the Waves from 1776 to the Present Day. London: HarperCollins. ISBN 978-0-00-710558-8. OCLC 53783010.
