= Mervyn Patrick Wingfield, 9th Viscount Powerscourt =

Irish Viscount (1905–1973)

Mervyn Patrick Wingfield
- 9th Viscount Powerscourt
- Predecessor: Mervyn Richard Wingfield
- Successor: Mervyn Niall Wingfield
- Other titles: 9th Baron Wingfield, 3rd Baron Powerscourt
- Born: 22 August 1905; Enniskerry, County Wicklow, Ireland
- Died: 3 April 1973 (aged 67); Dunsany, County Meath, Ireland
- Residence: Powerscourt Estate(until 1961)
- Spouse: Sheila Claude Beddington (married 16 December 1932)
- Issue: Mervyn Niall, Grania, Guy Claude Patrick
- Military career
- Branch: British Army
- Service years: 1939–1945
- Rank: Major
- Units: 8th Hussars, Royal Irish Fusiliers
- Conflicts: World War II - North Africa Campaign
- Awards: 1939–45 Star, Africa Star, War Medal 1939–45, Coronation Medal 1953

Mervyn Patrick Wingfield, 9th Viscount Powerscourt (22 August 1905 – 3 April 1973), was an Anglo-Irish peer.

== Biography ==
He was the eldest son of Mervyn Wingfield, 8th Viscount Powerscourt and his wife Sybil Pleydell-Bouverie. He married Sheila Claude Beddington on 16 December 1932 in Jerusalem. They had three children, a daughter, Grania Langrishe, the son and heir Mervyn Niall Wingfield (1935-2015), the 10th Viscount Powerscourt, and Guy Wingfield.

The Second World War had a huge impact on the family. The then Mervyn Patrick Wingfield (who succeeded as 9th Viscount Powerscourt in March 1947) served in the war and was captured by the Germans in Italy. When he came home, his health had been compromised and he suffered from shell shock. His wife Sheila (known as Lady Powerscourt from March 1947) had taken their children to Bermuda. They returned home when he did. He came into his inheritance of the Powerscourt Estate in March 1947, when he became Lord Powerscourt. His marriage never recovered from the impact of the war. In 1961, as a result of the financial impacts, he sold the Powerscourt estate. In 1963, his wife left him.

In 1961, the estate was bought by Ralph Slazenger, whose daughter Wendy Slazenger married Powerscourt's elder son Mervyn Wingfield in 1962. He succeeded as the Viscount Powerscourt in 1973. The 11th Viscount thus still has a family connection with the estate.

Powerscourt was appointed the first Chief Scout of the Boy Scouts of Ireland (BSI) in 1949.

He was an uncle of the mother of Sarah Ferguson.

Peerage of Ireland
| Preceded by Mervyn Wingfield | Viscount Powerscourt; 1947–1973 | Succeeded by Mervyn Wingfield |
