= Gonzalo Pieres =

Argentine polo player

Gonzalo Pieres Jr. (Gonzalito)
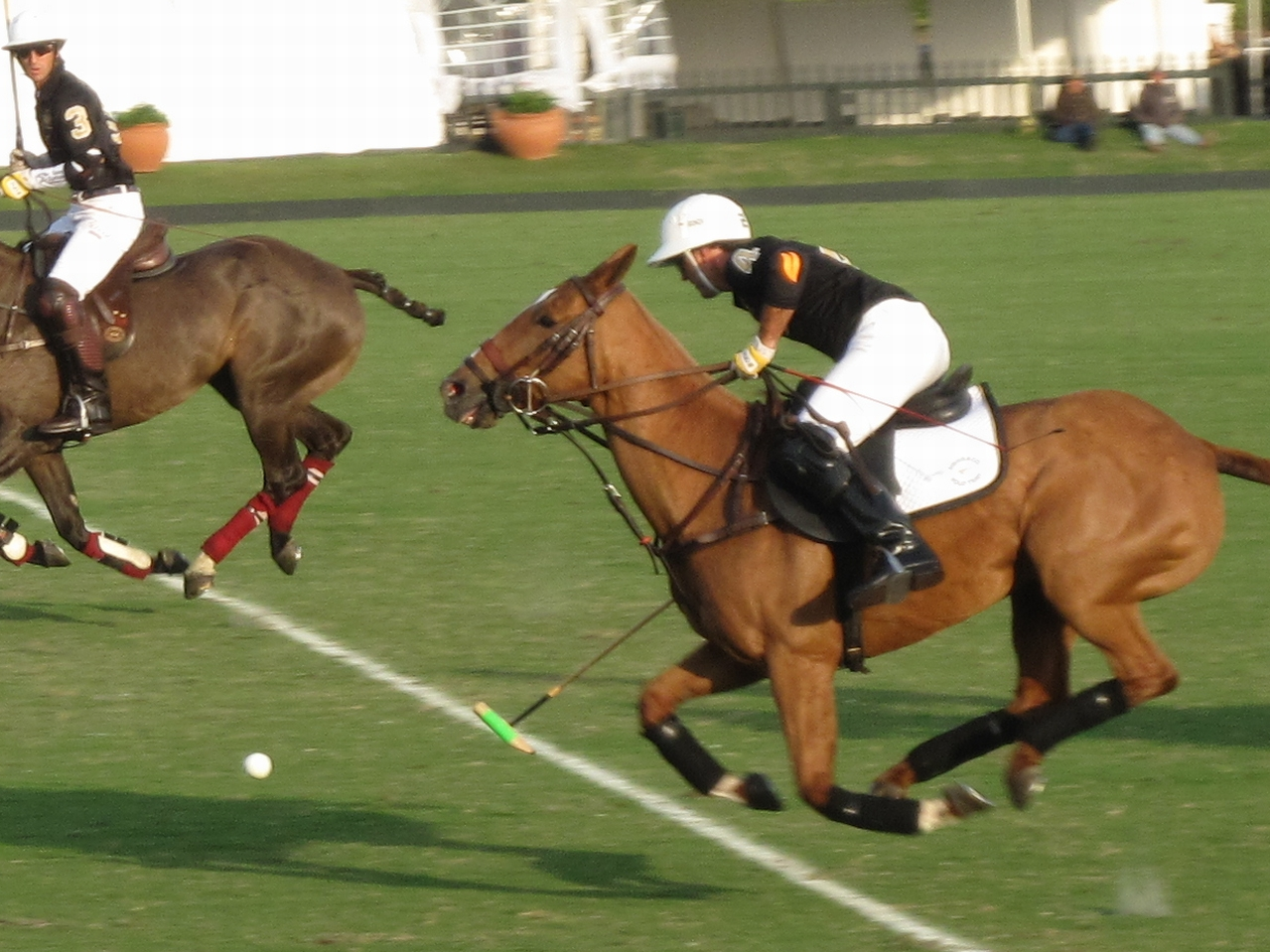
- Gonzalo Pieres
- Born: December 17, 1982 (age 42); Buenos Aires, Buenos Aires Province
- Occupation: Polo Player
- Spouse: Maria Rapetti
- Parent(s): Gonzalo Pieres; Cecilia Pieres

Gonzalo Pieres Jr. (born December 17, 1982) Buenos Aires, Buenos Aires Province is a professional Argentine polo player with a 10-goal handicap. He was once the top-ranked male polo player in the world.

== Biography ==
=== Early life ===
Gonzalito was born into a family of polo players and is the eldest son of polo legend Gonzalo Pieres Sn and his wife Cecilia Rodríguez Piola. His siblings are Tatiana Pieres, married to 10-goaler Mariano Aguerre, Facundo Pieres, Nicolas Pieres and Cecilia Pieres.

=== Career ===
He debuted in the Argentine Open in 1999, taking part every year since then. After losing the Argentine Open finals in 2005 and 2007 in extra-time only, his team Ellerstina was considered a strong rival for the La Dolfina Polo Team and in 2008 met the expectations by beating La Dolfina 13-12 through a golden goal in an extra-chukka, which was made by Gonzalo.

Other teams Gonzalo played for include Audi, Loro Piana, Outback, Ellerston, Tonkawa, and Black Watch. He has won tournaments in Sotogrande (Spain), Deauville (France) and England. In 2008, he won the Abierto Argentino de Polo with Ellerstina Etiqueta Negra and the Queen's Cup with Ellerston for the first time.

== Honors ==
Pieres was inducted into the Museum of Polo and Hall of Fame in 2008.
