= Mervyn Wingfield, 8th Viscount Powerscourt =

Anglo-Irish peer (1880–1947)

The Honourable Viscount Powerscourt KP MVO
- Predecessor: Mervyn Edward Wingfield
- Successor: Mervyn Patrick Wingfield
- Born: Mervyn Richard Wingfield; 16 July 1880; London, England
- Died: 21 March 1947 (aged 66); Powerscourt Estate, County Wicklow, Ireland
- Residence: Powerscourt Estate
- Spouse: Sybil Pleydell-Bouverie (m. 1903)
- Issue: Doreen, Meryvn and Bryan
- Occupation: Public service, involvement in Irish politics, and military service during WWI
- Military career
- Branch: Irish Guards
- Service years: 1914–1918
- Rank: Captain
- Awards: Belgian Croix de Guerre, Royal Victorian Order (MVO)

Mervyn Richard Wingfield, 8th Viscount Powerscourt KP MVO (16 July 1880 – 21 March 1947) was an Anglo-Irish peer.

== Life ==
Wingfield was born to Mervyn Wingfield, 7th Viscount Powerscourt, whom he succeeded as Viscount Powerscourt in 1904.

He was commissioned in the Irish Guards in February 1901, and promoted to Lieutenant on 3 July 1901. The Irish Guards had been created in 1900, and Wingfield was chosen to carry the colours at the first presentation of Colours to the Regiment on 30 May 1902, following which he was appointed a Member of the Royal Victorian Order (MVO). He was appointed Lord Lieutenant of Wicklow on 15 February 1910 and created a Knight of the Order of St Patrick on 18 April 1916.

He served as Commissioner for Leinster in the Dublin Boy Scouts and allowed Scouts to have extensive access to the Powerscourt Estate for camping. He was involved in early Scouting milestones, attending the 1st World Scout Jamboree at Olympia in 1920. He was awarded the Silver Wolf by the Scout Association in 1924 and welcomed Baden Powell to the estate in 1928 to review a party of Scouts.

Lord Powerscourt died on 21 March 1947.

== Family ==
In 1903, he married Sybil Pleydell-Bouverie: they had three children, including Mervyn Patrick Wingfield, 9th Viscount Powerscourt. Lady Powerscourt served as the Girl Guides Deputy Chief Commissioner for Ireland.

Through the Wingfield line he was a descendant of the Noble House of Stratford. He is a great-grandfather of Sarah Ferguson through her mother Susan Barrantes, who is Powerscourt's granddaughter.

Honorary titles
Preceded by The Earl of Carysfort	Lord Lieutenant of Wicklow; 1910–1922	Irish Free State formed
Peerage of Ireland
Preceded by Mervyn Wingfield	Viscount Powerscourt; 1904–1947	Succeeded by Mervyn Wingfield
