= Mervyn Wingfield =

Mervyn Wingfield DSO DSC
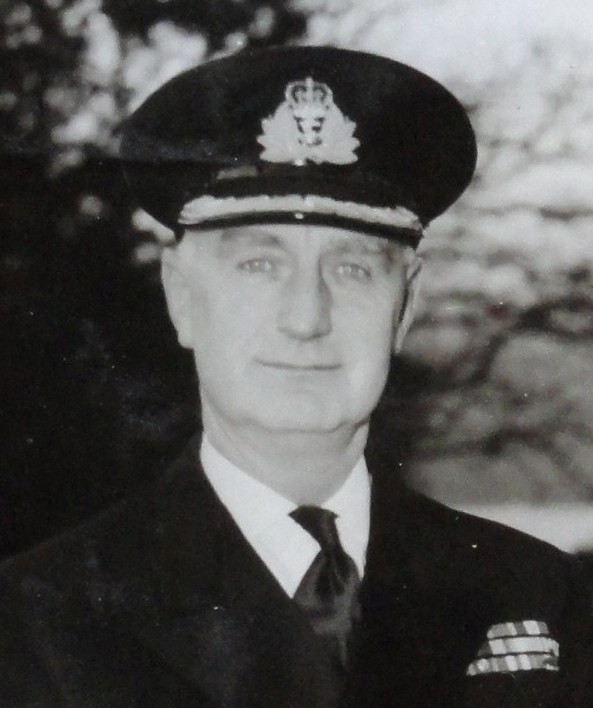
- Captain Mervyn Wingfield RN
- Born: 16 January 1911
- Died: 15 May 2005 (aged 94)
- Military career
- Allegiance: United Kingdom
- Rank: Captain
- Awards: Distinguished Service Order; Distinguished Service Cross

Captain Mervyn Robert George Wingfield DSO DSC (16 January 1911 – 15 March 2005) was a Royal Navy officer who served in submarines throughout World War II, narrowly surviving a sinking after a collision in the North Sea, and was the first British submarine commander to sink a Japanese submarine.

== Early life ==
Wingfield was born in Rathgar, Ireland, youngest son of Colonel the Rev William Wingfield, Royal Field Artillery. His father had been awarded a DSO at Gallipoli. He was educated at Bedford School and Pangbourne College, entering Dartmouth Naval College as a cadet at the age of 14.

== Royal Navy ==
As a midshipman he trained in battleships Benbow, Warspite and Valiant before joining the submarine service in 1934. He spent five years in the submarine HMS Odin, cruising all over South East Asia and training his crew in gunnery. When war broke out Odin sailed to Colombo and then Malta, from which Wingfield returned home in May 1940 through France to take the training course for a submarine command.

== Wartime ==
His first command was a World War I submarine, the H28, in which he patrolled off the coast of the Netherlands. This was followed by the newly built but ill-fated Umpire which sank in the North Sea after a night time collision in July 1941 with an armed British trawler, the Peter Hendriks. Wingfield, picked up semi-conscious from the North Sea forty minutes later, was the only survivor of the four men who had been on the bridge. Of those men trapped in the hull who escaped, one was Edward Young who described the incident in his book ‘One of Our Submarines’. Wingfield was then given command of the submarine Sturgeon which made two Arctic patrols. In one of these he penetrated Trondheim fjord submerged, despite the presence of mines, and sunk a merchant ship, for which he received a DSO. Between these patrols Sturgeon acted as a navigating beacon for the raid on St Nazaire in March 1942.

From September 1942 Wingfield commanded the submarine Taurus which, after a patrol to Norway, was based first in Algiers, enforcing a blockade of Marseille, then in Malta, operating in the Aegean, and finally in Beirut, attacking enemy shipping and landing agents on Greek islands. While sinking caiques in one Greek harbour, the submarine came under attack from horse-mounted Bulgars and returned to sea under a hail of machine-gun fire.

Taurus then sailed to Colombo, patrolling the Andaman Sea and Malacca Straits, and on 13 November 1943 torpedoed and sank the Japanese submarine I-34. This was the first Japanese submarine to be sunk by a Royal Navy submarine. In the ensuing counterattack Taurus was damaged by depth charges but surfaced and the well-trained 4-inch gun crew surprised and disabled the Japanese submarine chaser. Wingfield was awarded a bar to the DSC he had earned in the Mediterranean. See Action of 13 November 1943.

Transferring to Trincomalee, Taurus was occupied in mine-laying off Penang and attacking Japanese shipping. In May 1944, she departed the Indian Ocean and Wingfield took the submarine home via Aden, Port Said, Malta and Gibraltar to Holy Loch, Scotland for a refit after twelve war patrols in two years.

== After the war ==
Wingfield was appointed second-in-command of the cruiser Euryalus, the flagship of Admiral Earl Mountbatten. This was followed by staff appointments in Washington DC and Norfolk, Virginia, then in NATO, Paris. Promoted to Captain in 1953, his first role was at HMS Jupiter on the Gare Loch, West Scotland, before appointment as Naval Attaché in Athens and Tel Aviv during the Suez Crisis. His final command, after three years as Director of Underwater Weapons at the Admiralty, was the Royal Naval Air Station at Abbotsinch, Scotland, before retirement in 1963. He died at Hindhead, Surrey, in 2005, aged 94, survived by his wife Sheila, their daughter and their two sons.

Wingfield wrote his memoirs in the 1980s and these were published in edited form by Whittles in 2012 as Wingfield at War. In his foreword, Admiral Lord Boyce wrote:

Captain Mervyn Wingfield was one of the last of his generation of submariners who made their reputation in World War II. Before the war he had served on the China station; in the war he commanded three submarines, Umpire, Sturgeon and Taurus, survived a collision in the North Sea, spent a winter in the Arctic, penetrated the Norwegian fjords submerged through a minefield, surfaced off St Nazaire in view of German guns to act as a navigation marker for the raiding force, fought cavalry in the northern Aegean, and later, off Penang, was the first to sink a Japanese submarine – and barely survived the subsequent, vicious counterattack after Taurus was severely damaged and became stuck in the mud at the bottom. Any one of these incidents would have merited a place for Wingfield in the history of naval warfare and the pantheon of submarine heroes. It is remarkable that one man should have been involved in so much action in so few years.
