= Gonzalo Pieres Sr. =

Gonzalo Pieres is a former 10-goal handicap polo player and one of the most successful players in the sport.

== Background ==
Gonzalo was born and grew up in Argentina.

== Career ==
Pieres began traveling to America to play polo in 1980, when he held an eight-goal handicap. His handicap had been raised to 10 within a few years.

Gonzalo Pieres is recognized for turning professional polo players, into real sport professionals.

He won the Argentine Open nine times, and the United States Polo Association Gold Cup seven times. He has been on the winning team in the Queen's Cup, British Open. In 1994 Gonzalo won the Argentine triple crown with Adolfo Cambiaso, Mariano Aguerre, and Carlos Gracida.

For many years Gonzalo played with Kerry Packer, and in 1992 they founded Ellerstina, a polo team that has claimed multiple titles at the Argentine Open and other high-handicap tournaments. In addition, the Pieres still have strong ties with Packer's son James.

== Family ==
Gonzalo's sons, Gonzalo (Jr), Facundo and Nicolás, are also professional polo players with 10-goal handicaps. Gonzalo has played for Ellerstina since 1992, whereas Facundo joined the team in 2003 and Nicolás in 2011.

Gonzalo has a daughter, Tatiana who is married to Mariano Aguerre also a 10 goler at Ellerstina on the 2012 season.
