= Powerscourt Estate =

Estate in Enniskerry, County Wicklow, Ireland

Powerscourt House
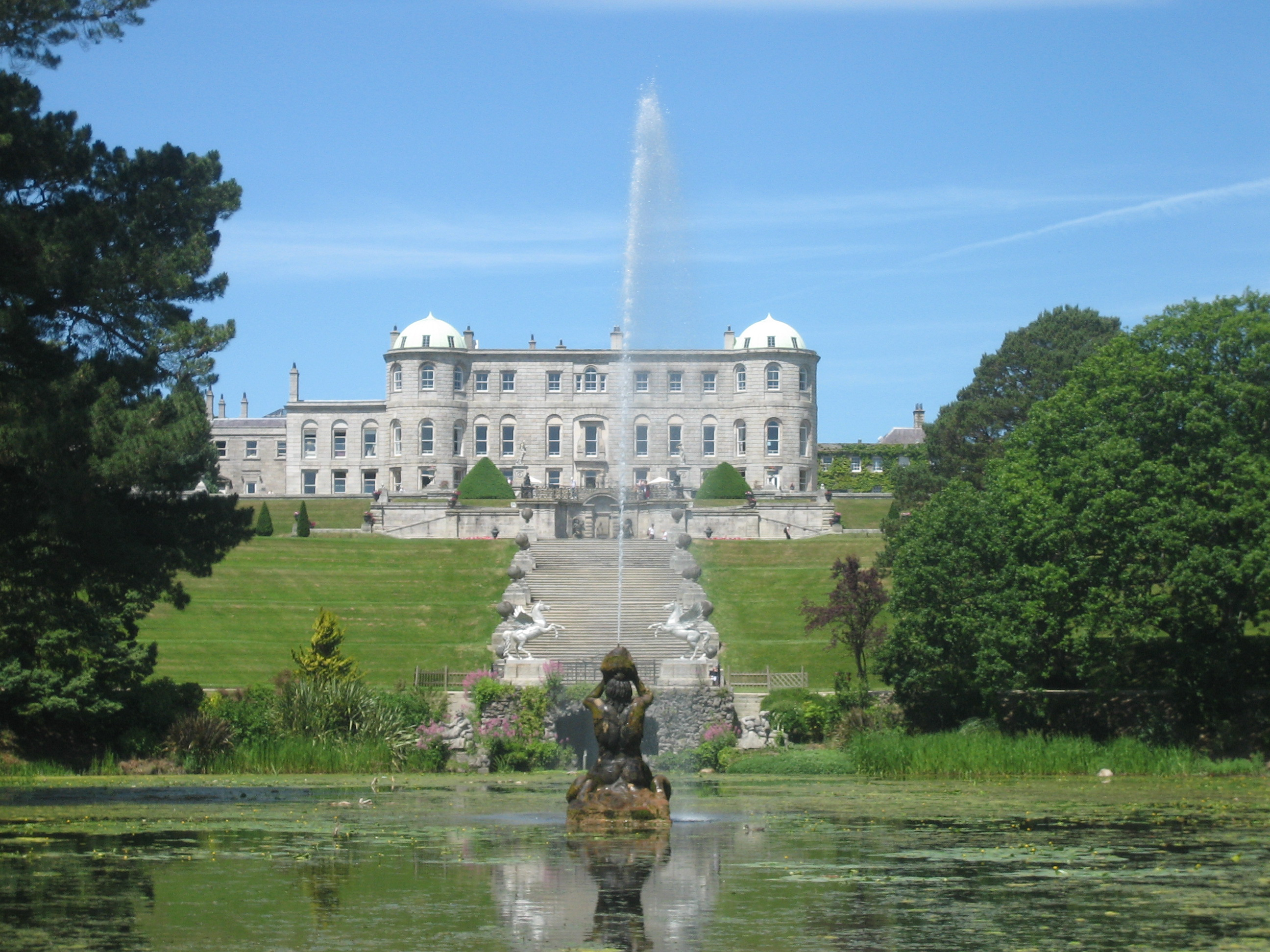
- The facade at Powerscourt

General information
- Architectural style: Palladian
- Location: Enniskerry, County Wicklow, Ireland
- Coordinates: 53°11′05″N 6°11′13″W
- Construction started: 1731
- Completed: 1741
- Client: Richard, 1st Viscount Powerscourt

Design and construction
- Architect: Richard Cassels

Powerscourt Estate (Irish: Eastát Chúirt an Phaoraigh), located in Enniskerry, County Wicklow, Ireland, is a large country estate which is noted for its house and landscaped gardens, today occupying 19 hectares (47 acres). The house, originally a 13th-century castle, was extensively altered during the 18th century by German architect Richard Cassels, starting in 1731 and finishing in 1741. A fire in 1974 left the house lying as a shell until it was renovated in 1996.

The Wingfield family had long coveted the lands of Phelim O'Toole of Powerscourt (d. 1603), seeking to draw O'Toole into an act of rebellion, the penalty for which was forfeiture. The feud climaxed on 14 May 1603 when the Wingfields murdered Phelim in the place known as the Killing Hollow near Powerscourt, despite the fact that Phelim's grandson and heir Turlough son of Phelim's son (d. 1616) remained in occupation of Powerscourt. King James I of England (d. 1625) on 27 October 1603 granted a lease of the manor of Powerscourt for 21 years to Sir Richard Wingfield for a rent of £6 Irish and a knight's fee. The reasons for the forfeiture of the O'Toole estates were because of the rebellious acts of Brian O'Neill (d. 1549) and Phelim O'Toole himself. That the actions of O'Brien, O'Neill and O'Toole, Lord of Kinelarty, were cited as a reason for forfeiture was bizarre given the fact that at least Phelim O'Toole received a posthumous pardon for unspecified offences on 23 April 1549. Furthermore, alongside Baron Cromwell, his estates were surrendered to regrant.

The former family seat of the Viscounts Powerscourt, the estate has been owned by the Slazenger family, founders and former owners of the Slazenger sporting goods business, since 1961. It is a popular tourist attraction, and includes Powerscourt Golf Club, an Avoca Handweavers restaurant, and an Autograph Collection Hotel.

A related property is Powerscourt House, Dublin, which was the townhouse of the familym, and is now a shopping and dining complex.

== History ==
=== 13th-century house ===
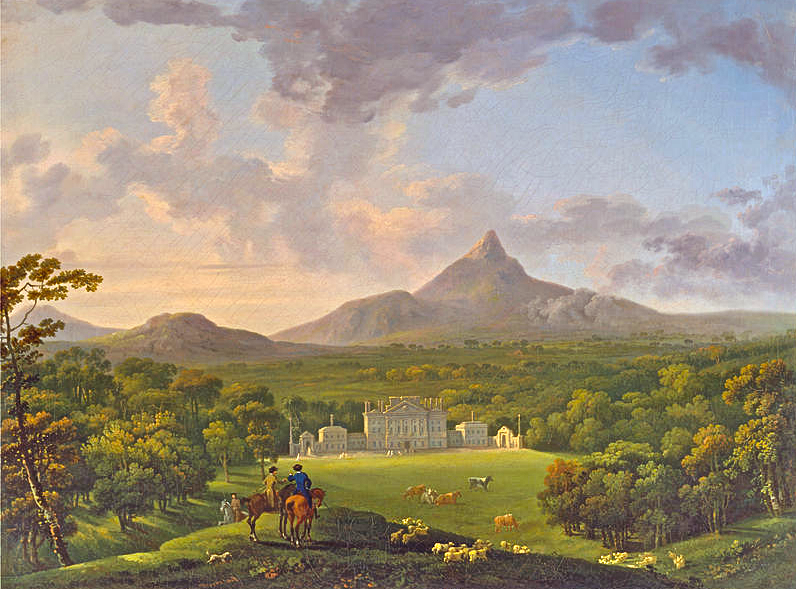
Powerscourt House and Great Sugar Loaf from a painting by George Barret Sr. in 1760

The original owner of the 13th-century castle was an Anglo-Norman nobleman by the name of La Poer, which surname was eventually anglicised to "Power." The castle's position was of strategic military importance because the castle's owner could control access to the nearby Dargle, Glencree and Glencullen rivers.

The three-storey house had at least 68 rooms. The entrance hall, where family heirlooms were displayed, was 18 metres (60 ft) long and 12 metres (40 ft) wide. The main reception rooms were on the first floor rather than on the ground floor, the more typical location. A mile-long avenue of beech trees led to the house.

=== 18th-century house ===
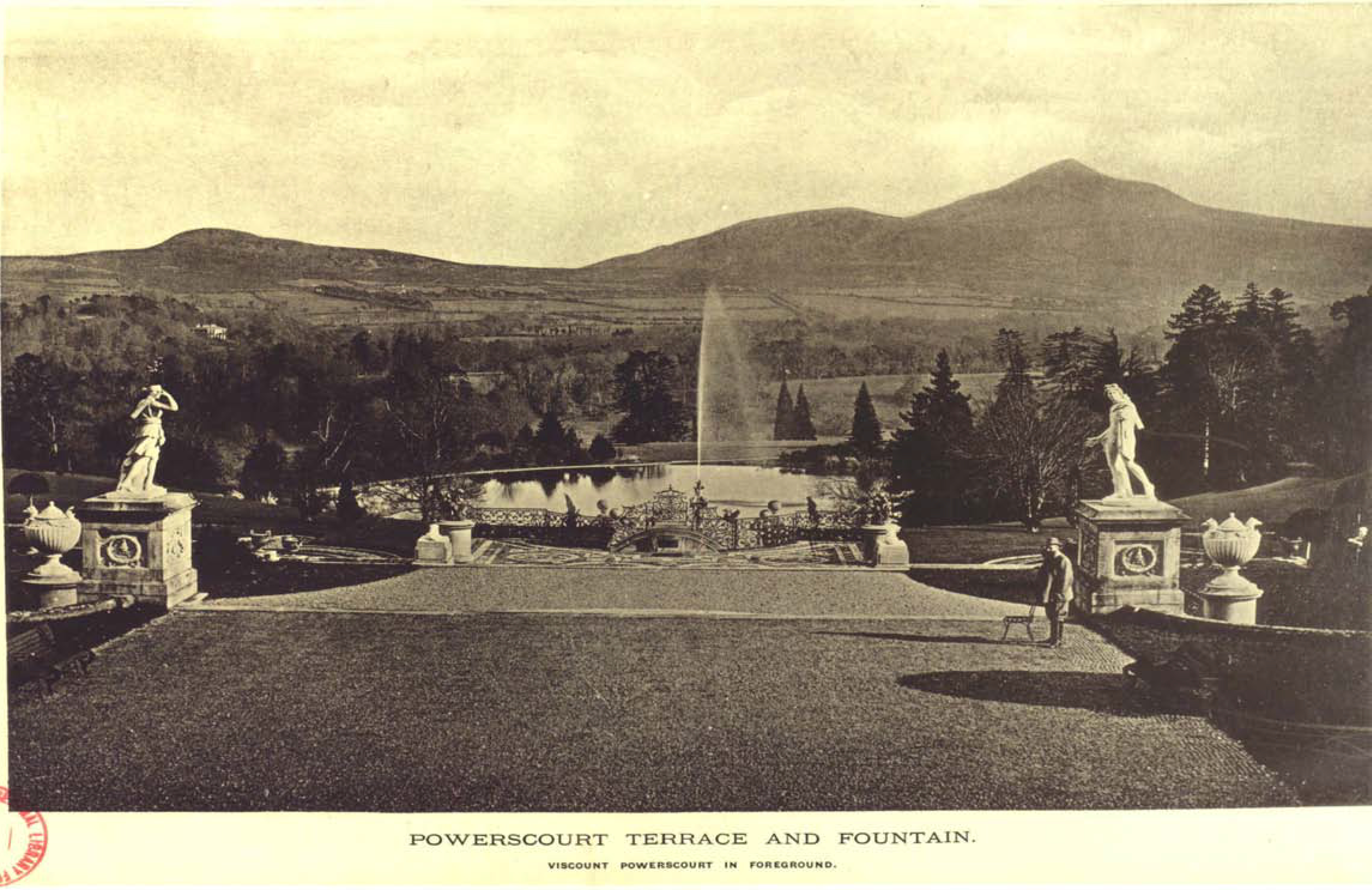
Powerscourt House terrace & fountain (1800s)

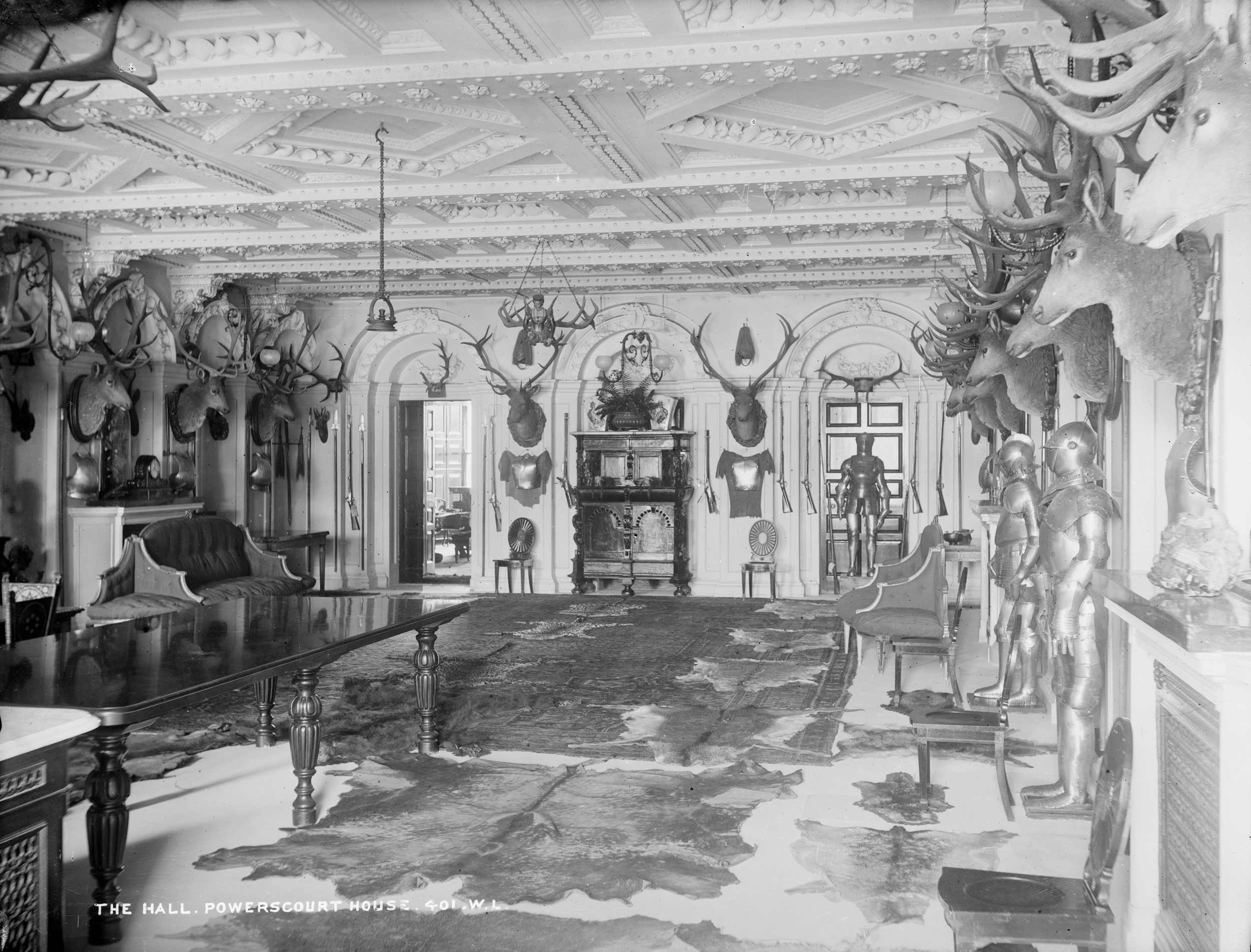
The hall at Powerscourt House, circa 1890

During the 16th century the house came into the ownership of the Powerscourt family. The family rose in wealth and prominence, and in the 18th century Richard Wingfield, 1st Viscount Powerscourt, commissioned the architect Richard Cassels to extensively alter and remodel the medieval castle to create a modern country house. Work started in 1731 and finished in 1741.

Using the commanding hilltop position, Cassels deviated slightly from his usual sombre style, giving the house something of what Sir John Vanbrugh would have called the 'castle air.' This is most noticeable in the structure's severe palladian facade bookended by two circular domed towers.

King George IV was the guest of the 5th Viscount Powerscourt in August 1821. In the 1830s, the house was the venue for a number of conferences on unfulfilled Bible prophecies, which were attended by men such as John Nelson Darby and Edward Irving. These conferences were held under the auspices of Theodosia, Dowager Viscountess Powerscourt. Her letters and papers were republished in 2004, including summaries of the Powerscourt prophetic conferences.

=== 19th-century gardens ===
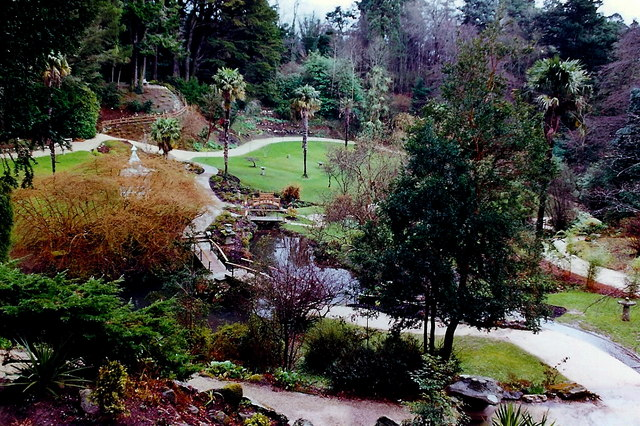
Japanese gardens at Powerscourt Estate

In 1844, at the age of 8, Mervyn Wingfield, 7th Viscount Powerscourt, inherited the title and the Powerscourt Estate, which comprised 200 km^{2} (77 sq mi) of land in Ireland. When young Lord Powerscourt reached the age of 21, he embarked on an extensive renovation of the house and created the new gardens.

Main attractions in the grounds include the Tower Valley (with stone tower), Japanese gardens, winged horse statues, Triton Lake, pet cemetery, Dolphin Pond, walled gardens, Bamberg Gate and the Italian Garden. The Pepperpot Tower is said to be designed after a favoured 3-inch pepperpot of Lady Wingfield. Of particular note is the Pets Cemetery, whose tombstones have been described as "astonishingly personal".

Inspiration for the garden design followed visits by Powerscourt to ornamental gardens at the Palace of Versailles, Schönbrunn Palace near Vienna, and Schwetzingen Castle near Heidelberg. The garden development took 20 years to complete in 1880.

=== 20th-century fire and renovation ===
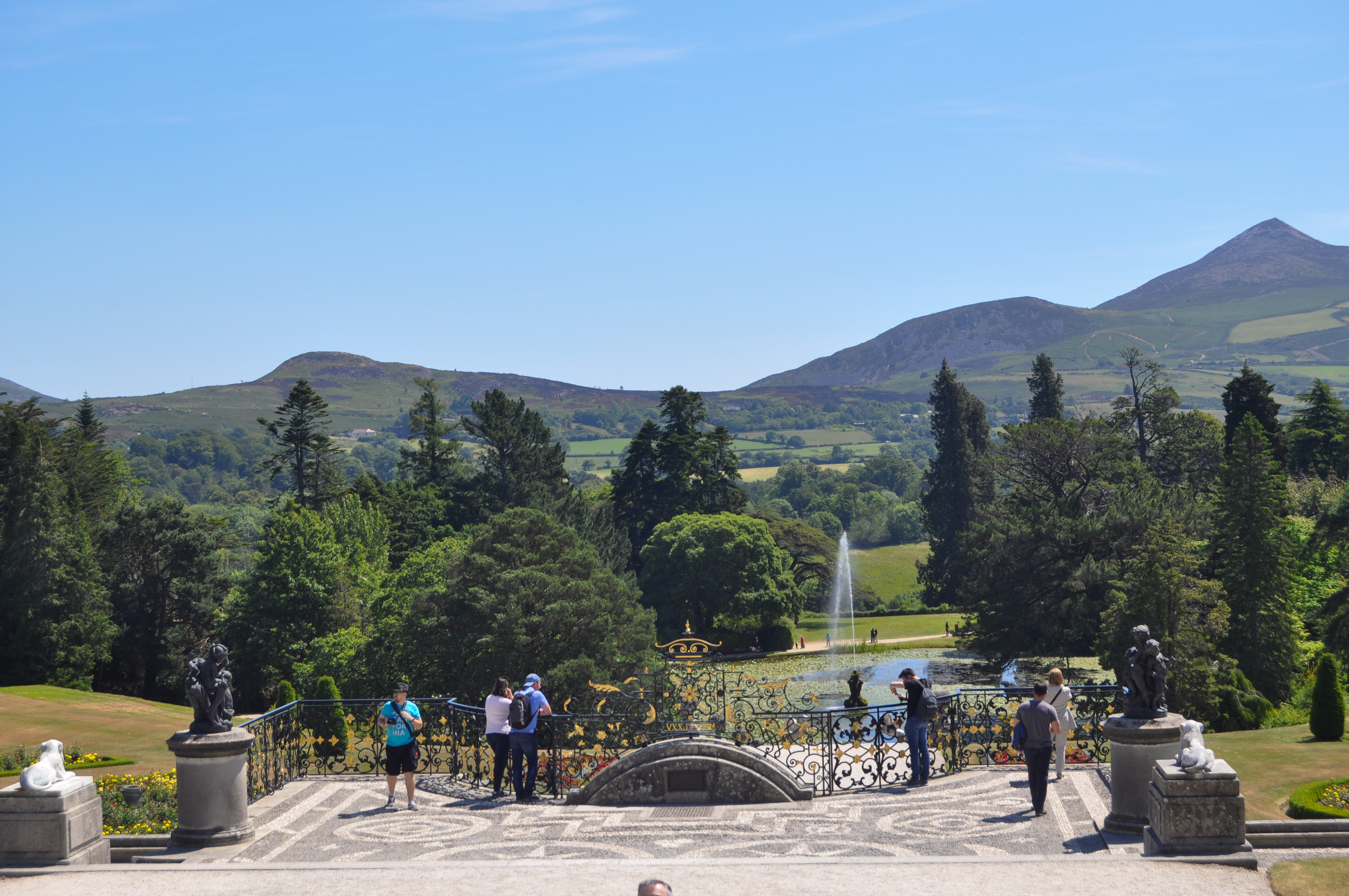
Steps overlooking Triton Lake

From the early part of the 20th century, the estate had a strong connection with the Scout movement. The 8th Viscount Powerscourt in particular encouraged the movement, with Scout Groups allocated areas of the estate to camp on, with some building huts and cabins onsite, most notably the 16th Dublin (Jewish) Scouts. Baden Powell visited a large camp on the estate in 1928.

In 1961, the estate was sold by the 9th Viscount Powerscourt to the Slazenger family, who still own it as of 2021. Wendy Slazenger, daughter of the late Ralph Slazenger, married Mervyn Wingfield (1935–2015) in 1962. Mervyn later succeeded, in 1973, as the 10th Viscount Powerscourt. Through her children, the 11th Viscount – Mervyn Anthony Wingfield – and Julia Wingfield, there remains a strong connection between the two families and the Powerscourt Estate. The house was destroyed by fire on 4 November 1974 and was subsequently renovated in 1996. Only two rooms are open to the public as they once appeared while Powerscourt had residents, while the rest of ground floor and first floor are now retail units.

In 2011, Lonely Planet nominated Powerscourt in the "Top Ten Houses in the World", while in 2014, National Geographic listed Powerscourt as No. 3 in the World's Top Ten Gardens.

=== 21st century ===
==== Tara's Palace Museum of Childhood ====
Tara's Palace Museum of Childhood relocated from Malahide Castle near Dublin to Powerscourt House in June 2011. The museum features dollhouses, miniatures, dolls, historic toys and Tara's Palace, one of the greatest dollhouses in the world, on a par with the Fairy Castle at the Museum of Science and Industry in Chicago, Illinois and Queen Mary's Dolls' House at Windsor Castle and the Astolat Dollhouse Castle. The museum closed in 2018 and Tara's Palace is now on display at The Little Museum of Dublin.

== Waterfall ==
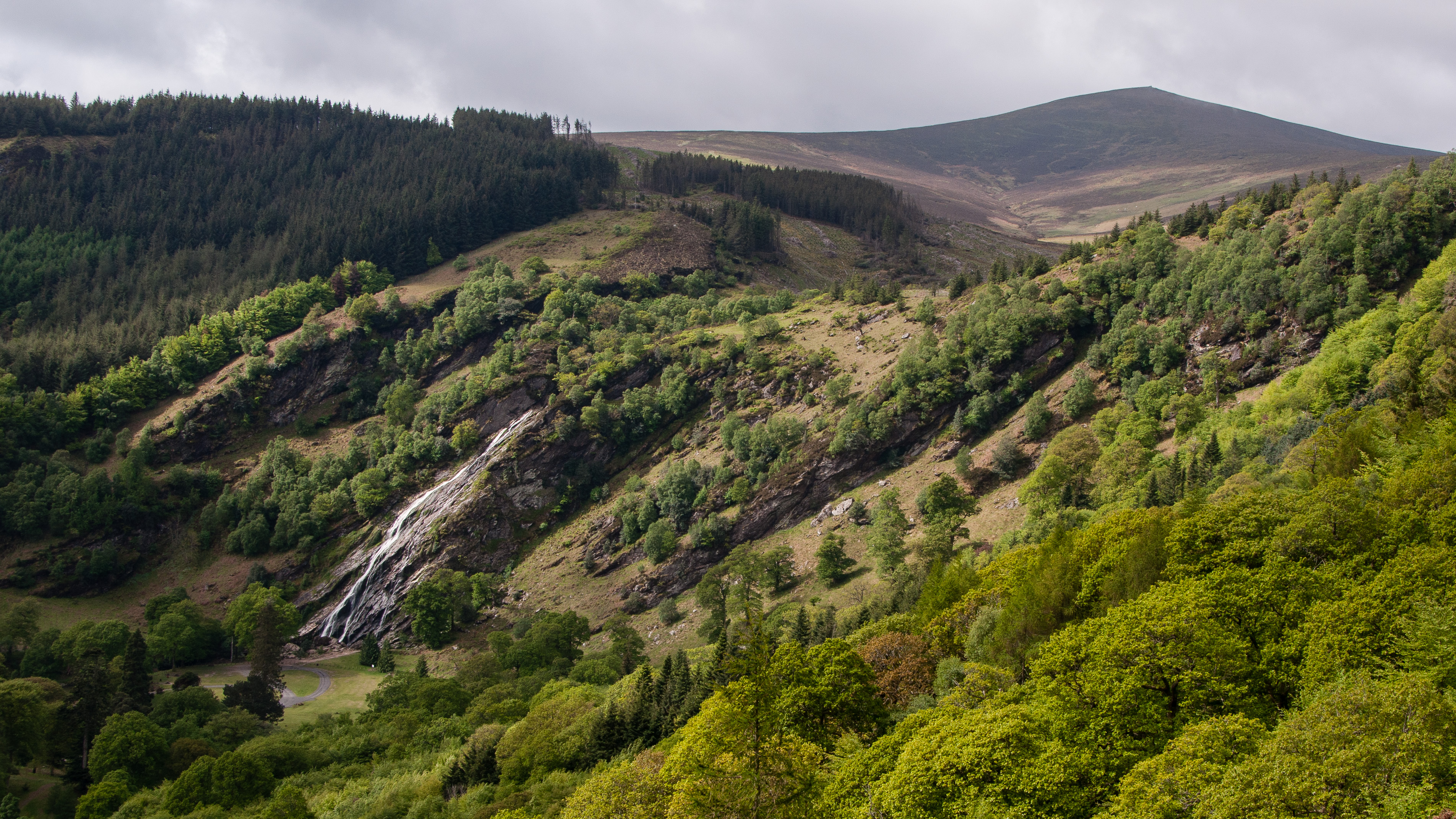
The waterfall

Powerscourt Waterfall and its surrounding valley are also owned by the Powerscourt Estate, although the two pieces of land are no longer directly connected. At 121 metres (397 ft), it is the second highest waterfall in Ireland. In 1858, The 7th Viscount Powerscourt established a deer park around the waterfall, resulting in the successful introduction of the Japanese Sika to Ireland.

Regular bus service from Powerscourt to the waterfall was discontinued in 2005, though during the high summer season, intermittent bus services are still available. The waterfall is seven kilometres from Enniskerry, and walkable. While the distance is not prohibitive, walking can be dangerous, as the road is narrow, and lacks a shoulder for long stretches.

A separate entrance fee is required for access to the waterfall, ranging from €3.50 (children) to €7.50 (adults).

== Powerscourt Hotel ==
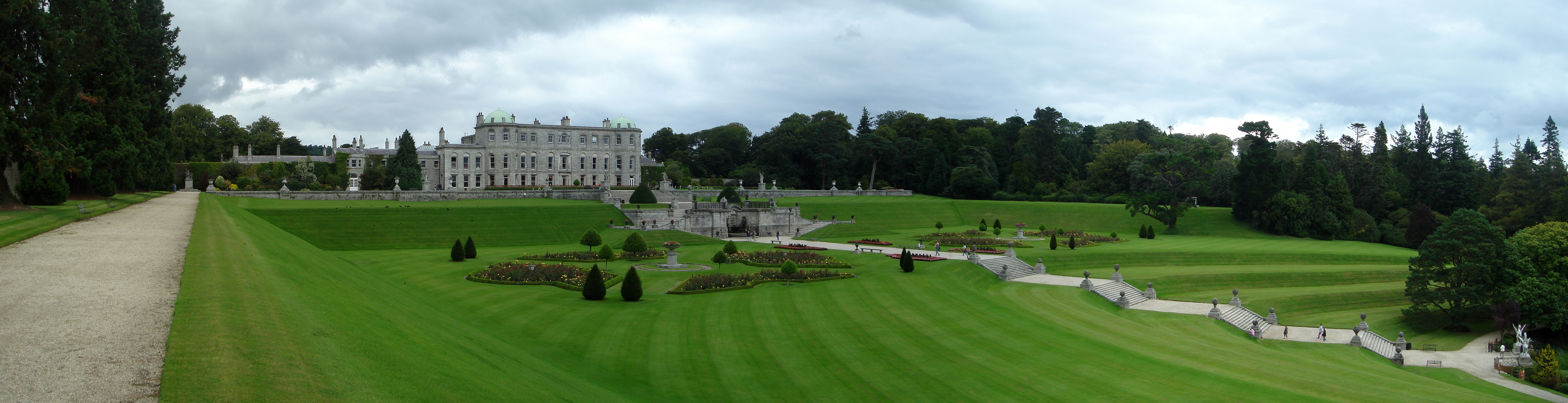
Powerscourt Estate

Powerscourt Hotel, located within the Powerscourt Estate is five-star neo-Palladian style hotel. The 203 bedroom hotel was constructed by Sisk Group on behalf of Treasury Holdings in 2007 at an estimated cost of €200m. Emblematic of the Celtic Tiger years, a photo of the hotel was featured on the front cover of the Anglo Irish Bank 2007 annual report. The hotel originally operated as a Ritz-Carlton however after this agreement was terminated in 2013 the hotel now operates as part of Marriott International's Autograph Collection.

The hotel was designed by James Toomey architects and the German firm HID.

The grounds are home to two par 72, 18-hole courses: the East, which was created first, and the West. Both contain fast greens and hilly fairways, and they are each over 6,900 yards (6,300 m) long. In 1998, the East Course was host to the Irish PGA Championship.

== Popular culture ==
- The house was used as a filming location for Barry Lyndon, before the 1974 fire.
- The Slazenger family invited Lynn Garrison to relocate his aerial film unit, aircraft collection and hangars, from Leixlip to the Powerscourt airfield in 1973. The collection featured in Irish productions, including The Blue Max, Darling Lili, Zeppelin and Von Richthofen and Brown. It remained here until 1981.
- The 2002 version of The Count of Monte Cristo was filmed there.
- David Copperfield was filmed there in 2000.
- Where's Jack? was filmed there in 1969.
- A key scene from the 1981 film Excalibur where Arthur fights Lancelot was filmed at the Waterfall.
- The short film Battle at Big Rock (2019), part of the Jurassic Park film franchise, was filmed there.
- Several scenes from Disenchanted (2022) take place in Powerscourt House, where the ballroom is used as Malvina Monroe's residence.
