= Mervyn Wingfield, 7th Viscount Powerscourt =

Irish peer

The Right Honourable The Viscount Powerscourt KP PC (Ire)
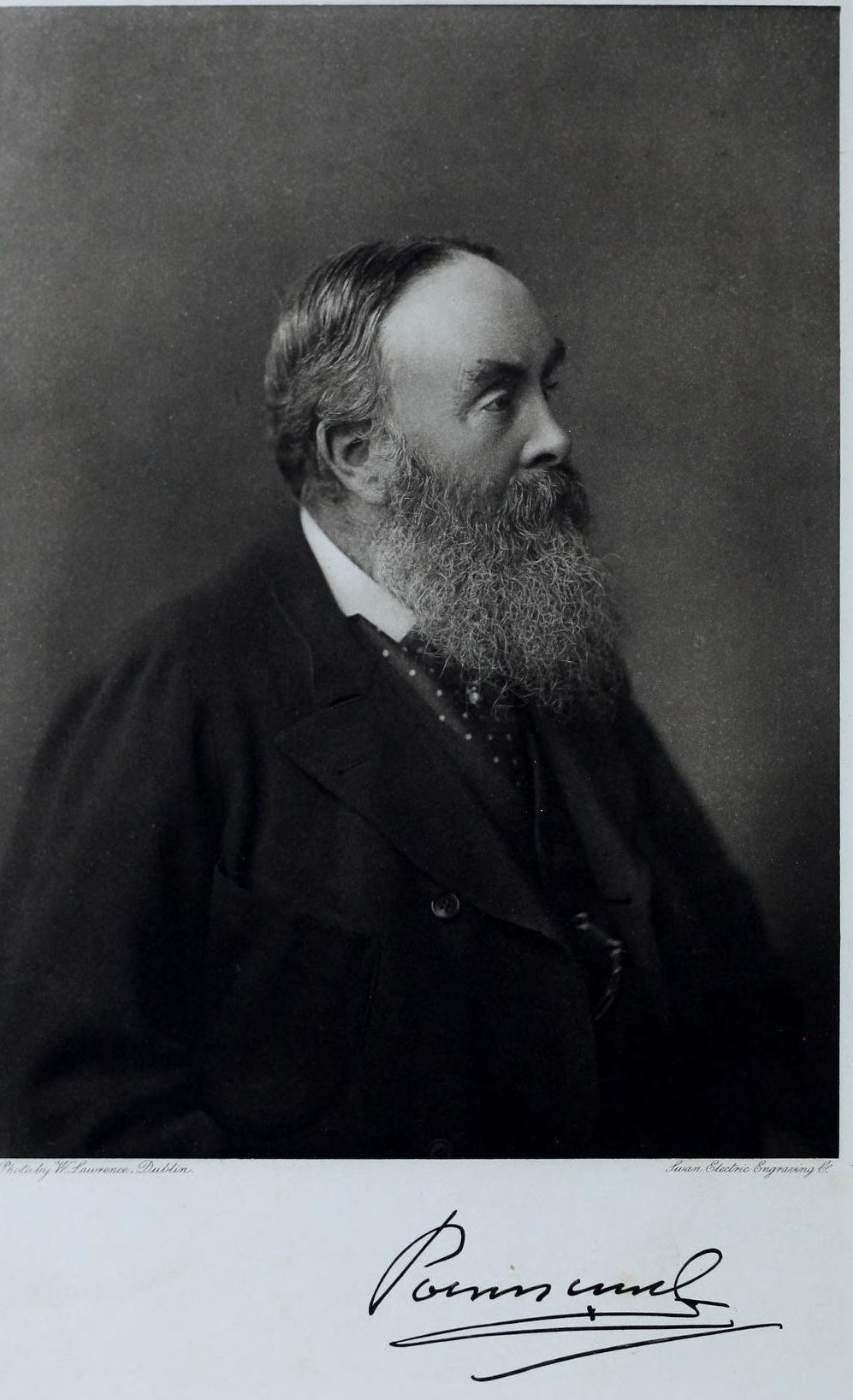
- Portrait of Viscount Powerscourt from his catalog in 1903
- Predecessor: Richard Wingfield
- Successor: Mervyn Wingfield
- Other titles: Baron Wingfield (UK)
- Born: Mervyn Edward Wingfield; 13 October 1836
- Died: 5 June 1904 (aged 67); London, England
- Noble family: Wingfield family
- Spouse: Lady Julia Coke
- Issue: 5 children, including Mervyn Wingfield, 8th Viscount Powerscourt
- Father: Richard Wingfield, 6th Viscount Powerscourt
- Mother: Lady Elizabeth France Charlotte
- Occupation: Peer, Military Officer, Art Collector

Mervyn Edward Wingfield, 7th Viscount Powerscourt KP PC (Ire) (13 October 1836 – 5 June 1904) was an Irish peer. He became Viscount Powerscourt in 1844 on the death of his father Richard Wingfield, 6th Viscount Powerscourt. Through this Wingfield line he was a maternal descendant of the Noble House of Stratford. His mother was Lady Elizabeth Frances Charlotte, daughter of Robert Jocelyn, 3rd Earl of Roden.

== Biography ==
On 26 April 1864, Wingfield married Lady Julia Coke, the daughter of Thomas Coke, 2nd Earl of Leicester. They had five children:

- Mervyn Wingfield, 8th Viscount Powerscourt (1880–1947), a great-grandfather of Sarah Ferguson
- Maj.-Gen. Hon. Maurice Anthony Wingfield (21 June 1883 – 14 April 1956), married Sybil Frances Leyland and had issue. He was Lees Knowles Lecturer in 1924
- Hon. Olive Elizabeth Wingfield (6 November 1884 – May 1978), married Maj. William John Bates van de Weyer and had issue
- Hon. Clare Meriel Wingfield (5 June 1886 – 1969), married Arthur Chichester, 4th Baron Templemore
- Hon. Lilah Katherine Julia Wingfield (13 January 1888 – 1981), married Sir Clive Morrison-Bell, 1st Baronet

He was commissioned as a Lieutenant in the part-time Wicklow Militia on 26 November 1870, promoted to Captain on 31 March 1871, and retired on 12 October 1871.

Powerscourt was appointed a Knight of the Order of St Patrick on 2 August 1871. He was created Baron Powerscourt in the Peerage of the United Kingdom in 1885, enabling him to sit in the House of Lords.

He owned 53,000 acres with 40,000 of these in Wicklow and 11,000 in Wexford and the remainder in Dublin.

=== Art collection ===
Lord Powerscourt collected paintings as a hobby and published a catalog in 1903 called A description and history of Powerscourt. He sometimes included details about his purchases in his list.

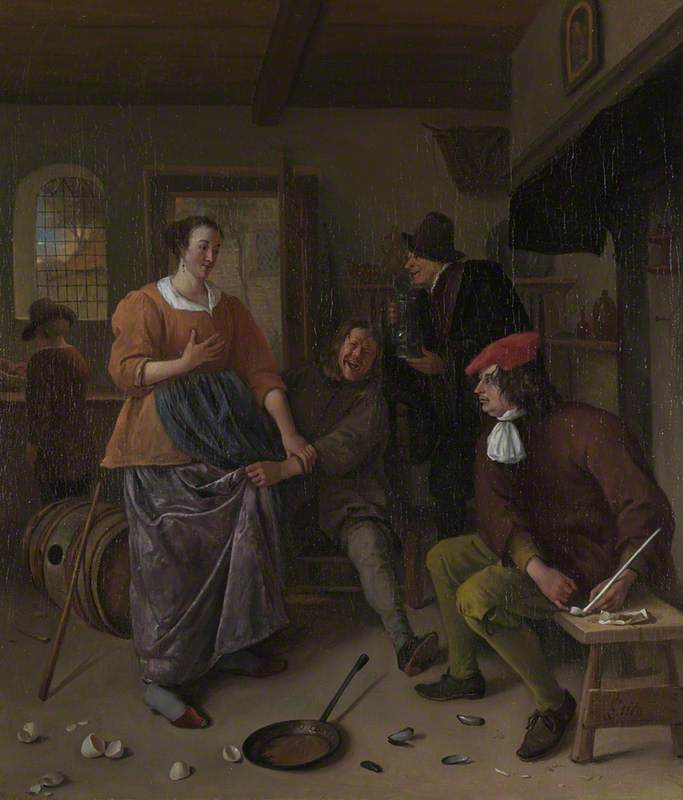
The painting of 'The Broken Eggs' by Jan Steen, according to Lord Powerscourt, shows "portraits of Jan Steen and his friend Van Goyen".

Peerage of Ireland
Preceded by Richard Wingfield	Viscount Powerscourt; 1844–1904	Succeeded by Mervyn Richard Wingfield
Peerage of the United Kingdom
New creation	Baron Powerscourt; 1885–1904	Succeeded by Mervyn Richard Wingfield
Political offices
Preceded by The Viscount Gort	Representative peer for Ireland; 1865–1904	Succeeded by The Lord Bellew
