= Beresford-Peirse baronets =

Baronetcy in the Baronetage of the United Kingdom

- Escutcheon of the Beresford-Peirse baronets of Bagnall
- Creation date: 1814
- Created by: George III
- Peerage: Peerage of the United Kingdom
- Status: extant
- Seats: The Hall, Bedale
- Motto: Nil nisi cruce, Depend only on the cross

The Beresford, later Beresford-Peirse Baronetcy, of Bagnall in the County of Waterford, is a title in the Baronetage of the United Kingdom. It was created on 21 May 1814 for John Beresford. He was an admiral in the Royal Navy and also represented Coleraine, Berwick-on-Tweed, Northallerton and Chatham in the House of Commons.

Beresford was the illegitimate son of George Beresford, 1st Marquess of Waterford, and the brother of William Beresford, 1st Viscount Beresford. He was succeeded by his son, the second Baronet, from his first marriage to Mary Molloy. He died without surviving male issue and was succeeded by his nephew, the third Baronet. He was the eldest son of Henry William de la Poer Beresford-Peirse (1820–1859), eldest son of the first Baronet's second marriage to Harriett Elizabeth, daughter of Henry Peirse. He served as Chairman of the North Riding County Council. His grandson, the fifth Baronet, was Director-General of the Forestry Commission between 1962 and 1968. As of 2022 the title is held by the latter's grandson, the seventh Baronet, who succeeded his father in 2013.

== Beresford, later Beresford-Peirse baronets, of Bagnall (1814) ==
- Sir John Poo Beresford, 1st Baronet (1766–1844)
- Sir George de la Poer Beresford, 2nd Baronet (1811–1873)
- Sir Henry Monson de la Poer Beresford-Peirse, 3rd Baronet (1850–1926)
- Sir Henry Bernard de la Poer Beresford-Peirse, 4th Baronet (1875–1949)
- Sir Henry Campbell de la Poer Beresford-Pierse, 5th Baronet (1905–1972)
- Sir Henry Grant de la Poer Beresford-Peirse, 6th Baronet (1933–2013)
- Sir Henry Njers de la Poer Beresford-Peirse, 7th Baronet (born 1969)

The heir apparent is the present holder's son, Harry Tamlyn de la Poer Beresford-Peirse (born 2007).

== Family tree ==
Family tree of the Marquess of Waterford and related titles

Baron Power, of Curraghmore, 1535
Richard Power d. 1539; 1st Baron Power of Curraghmore
Piers Power d. 1545; 2nd Baron Power of Curraghmore	John Power; 1516–1592; 3rd Baron Power of Curraghmore
Richard Power d. 1607; 4th Baron Power of Curraghmore
Baronet of Coleraine in the County of Londonderry, 1665
Tristram Beresford d. 1673; 1st Baronet	John Power d. 1661; 5th Baron Power of Curraghmore
Earl of Tyrone and Viscount Decies (2nd creation), 1673
Randal Beresford d. 1681; 2nd Baronet	Richard Power; 1630–1690; 1st Earl of Tyrone, etc., 6th Baron Power
Tristram Beresford; 1669–1701; 3rd Baronet	John Power c. 1665–1693; 2nd Earl of Tyrone, etc., 7th Baron Power	James Power; 1667–1704; 3rd Earl of Tyrone, etc., 8th Baron Power
Heir to the Barony of Tyrone outlawed, 1688 and extinct, 1704; Earldom of Tyrone (2nd creation) and Viscount Decies extinct, 1704
Viscount Tyrone and Baron Beresford (1st creation), of Beresford, in the County of Cavan, 1720; Earl of Tyrone (3rd creation), 1746	Baron La Poer retrospectively granted, 1767
Marcus Beresford; 1694–1763; 1st Earl of Tyrone, etc., 4th Baronet	Katherine Power d. 1769; Baroness La Poer
Baron Tyrone, 1786; Marquess of Waterford, 1789	Baron Decies, of Decies in the County of Waterford, 1812
George Beresford; 1735–1800; 1st Marquess of Waterford, etc., 2nd Earl of Tyrone, etc., 5th Baronet	William Beresford, 1st Baron Decies; 1743–1819; 1st Baron Decies
Beresford, later Beresford-Peirse baronets of Bagnall, 1814	Baron Beresford (2nd creation), of Albuera and Dungarvan in the County of Waterford, 1814; Viscount Beresford, of Beresford in the County of Stafford, 1823
Henry Beresford; 1772–1826; 2nd Marquess of Waterford, etc., 3rd Earl of Tyrone, etc., 6th Baronet	John Poo Beresford; 1766–1844; 1st Baronet of Bagnall	William Carr Beresford; 1768–1854; 1st Viscount Beresford, etc.	Louisa Beresford d. 1851	John Horsley-Beresford; 1774–1865; 2nd Baron Decies
Viscountcy Beresford and Barony Beresford of Albuera and Dungarvan extinct, 1844
Henry Beresford; 1811–1859; 3rd Marquess of Waterford, etc., 4th Earl of Tyrone, etc., 7th Baronet	John Beresford; 1814–1866; 4th Marquess of Waterford, etc., 5th Earl of Tyrone, etc., 8th Baronet	George de la Poer Beresford; 1811–1873; 2nd Baronet of Bagnall	William Robert John Horsley Beresford; 1811–1893; 3rd Baron Decies
Baron Beresford (3rd creation) of Metemmeh and Curraghmore in the County of Waterford, 1916
John Henry Beresford; 1844–1895; 5th Marquess of Waterford, etc., 6th Earl of Tyrone, etc., 9th Baronet	Charles William de la Poer Beresford; 1846–1919; Baron Beresford of Metemmeh and Curraghmore	Henry Monson de la Poer Beresford-Peirse; 1850–1926; 3rd Baronet of Bagnall	William Marcus de la Poer Horsley Beresford; 1865–1910; 4th Baron Decies	John Graham Hope Horsley de la Poer Beresford; 1866–1944; 5th Baron Decies
Barony Beresford (3rd creation) extinct, 1919
Henry Beresford; 1875–1911; 6th Marquess of Waterford, etc., 7th Earl of Tyrone, etc., 10th Baronet	Henry Bernard de la Poer Beresford-Peirse; 1875–1949; 4th Baronet of Bagnall
John Charles Beresford; 1901–1934; 7th Marquess of Waterford, etc., 8th Earl of Tyrone, etc., 11th Baronet	Henry Campbell de la Poer Beresford-Peirse; 1905–1972; 5th Baronet of Bagnall	Arthur George Marcus Douglas de la Poer Beresford; 1915–1992; 6th Baron Decies
John Hubert Beresford; 1933–2015; 8th Marquess of Waterford, etc., 9th Earl of Tyrone, etc., 12th Baronet	Henry Grant de la Poer Beresford-Peirse; 1933–2013; 6th Baronet of Bagnall	Marcus Hugh Tristram de la Poer Beresford b. 1948; 7th Baron Decies
Henry Nicholas Beresford b. 1958; 9th Marquess of Waterford, etc., 10th Earl of Tyrone, etc., 13th Baronet	Henry Njers de la Poer Beresford-Peirse b. 1969; 7th Baronet of Bagnall
Richard John Beresford b. 1987 styled Earl of Tyrone	Harry Tamlyn de la Poer Beresford-Peirse b. 2007	Robert Marcus Duncan de la Poer Beresford b. 1988
Heir apparent to the Marquessate of Waterford	Heir apparent to the Barony Decies	Heir apparent to the Barony Decies

== See also ==
- Marquess of Waterford
- Viscount Beresford
- Noel Beresford-Peirse

== Notes ==
Baronetage of the United Kingdom
Preceded by Fowke baronets	Beresford baronets of Bagnall; 21 May 1814	Succeeded by Wylie baronets
