= Baron La Poer =

Title in Peerage of Ireland

Baron La Poer, de la Poer, is a title in the Peerage of Ireland held by the Marquess of Waterford. Its creation is the sole instance in the law of the Kingdom of Ireland recognising a peerage by writ.

== Origin of the title ==
The progenitor of the family was a companion of Strongbow, from whom he obtained grant for extensive lands in Waterford c. 1172. The barony was created in 1535 for Sir Richard le Poer.

James Power, 3rd Earl of Tyrone, who was also the 8th Baron Power, held both his titles by letters patent (dated 1535 and 1637 respectively), which specified that the titles would be inherited by heirs male of the grantee. When he died in 1704 however, his only child was a daughter, Lady Catharine Power. The Earldom became extinct, and in an ordinary course of events, the Barony of Power would have been inherited by his distant cousin, Colonel John Power (or Poore) of the French Régiment de Dublin. The colonel was however a Jacobite and therefore outlawed and attainted in 1688. Although inheriting none of the titles, Lady Catharine therefore inherited the land.

Lady Catharine grew up and married in 1717 an Irish politician, Sir Marcus Beresford, 4th Baronet. After a lawsuit with John Power, Sir Marcus and Lady Catharine retained the Power property, and Sir Marcus was raised into the Peerage of Ireland by creating him Viscount Tyrone in 1720. After the Jacobite rebellion of 1745, he was further elevated in 1746 as Earl of Tyrone (the same name of title as that of his father-in-law, but a new creation). After he died in 1763, Lady Catharine, now the Dowager Countess of Tyrone, had petitioned the Irish House of Lords to restore to her the "Barony de la Poer", which she asserted was created by writ for her grandfather Richard Power. He was summoned to the Parliament of Ireland somewhere in the 1650s, but was not yet a peer. He became the 6th Baron Power in 1661, and was created the 1st Earl of Tyrone and 1st Viscount Decies in 1673.

=== Petition ===
The petition was based on another writ received by Nicholas (fitz John) le Poer, of Kilmeadan, who was summoned to the Parliament of Ireland on 23 November 1375, 22 January 1378, and 11 September 1380. The Dowager Countess of Tyrone was a descendant of Nicholas's daughter Ellen, who married David Poer or Power, known as "Davey Rothe", of Conoughmore, ancestor of the Barons Power. Since Nicholas le Poer also had sons who left children, the Countess was not heiress of Nicholas.

Nevertheless, on 9 November 1767 the Irish House of Lords resolved that she had proved her case; the Crown confirmed this on 19 December 1767 and allowed her "all the rights and privileges belonging to the said Barony", as they had been held by "her grandfather Richard, who sat and voted as Baron La Poer". As Complete Peerage remarks, the effect of a resolution that "a lady was entitled to a barony that never existed" (and to which she would not be heiress if it had) is open to question; so is the confirmation in all the rights of a man who never held the barony.

=== Successors ===
When the Dowager Countess died, 27 July 1769, any title she may have held passed to her son George, 2nd Earl of Tyrone, who was promoted to Marquess of Waterford in 1789, as part of the British government's effort to manage Grattan's Parliament; all his titles are held today by Henry Beresford, 9th Marquess of Waterford.

== "Barony by writ" vs. "barony by patent" ==
Instead of a barony by patent, a "barony by writ" is a hereditary title created by a writ of summons, but without issuing a letters patent. Other differences are that a barony by writ is inherited in strict order of succession by the heirs general of the recipient of the writ: daughters of barons, if they are only children (like Countess Catharine), do therefore inherit such baronies. A barony by writ is a typical creation of English common law, but aside from this case, they are now almost non-existent in the Peerage of Ireland.

== Spelling ==
Both titles and the surnames le Poer and Power are all forms of the same name, originally Anglo-Norman le pover, meaning "the Poor" (i.e. poor man). The sobriquet specifically referred to a vow of poverty undertaken by religious men rather than ordinary poverty. It was quite common in medieval England and Ireland. Romantics have also claimed a connection with Poher in Brittany.

The spellings de la Poer and La Poer, in the feminine, originate from the Countess's petition, although it is ungrammatical, and J. H. Round called it "idiotic"; the feminine article may be the result of applying it to a peeress. Her spelling has been widely used as a middle name by her Beresford descendants; some of the Powers also adopted this fashionable spelling.

== Family tree ==
Family tree of the Marquess of Waterford, and related titles

Baron Power, of Curraghmore, 1535
Richard Power d. 1539; 1st Baron Power, of Curraghmore
Piers Power d. 1545; 2nd Baron Power, of Curraghmore	John Power; 1516–1592; 3rd Baron Power, of Curraghmore
Richard Power d. 1607; 4th Baron Power, of Curraghmore
Baronet 'of Coleraine', in the County of Londonderry, 1665
Tristram Beresford d. 1673; 1st Baronet	John Power d. 1661; 5th Baron Power, of Curraghmore
Earl of Tyrone and Viscount Decies (2nd creation), 1673
Randal Beresford d. 1681; 2nd Baronet	Richard Power; 1630–1690; 1st Earl of Tyrone and Viscount Decies, 6th Baron Power
Tristram Beresford; 1669–1701; 3rd Baronet	John Power c. 1665–1693; 2nd Earl of Tyrone and Viscount Decies, 7th Baron Power	James Power; 1667–1704; 3rd Earl of Tyrone and Viscount Decies, 8th Baron Power
Heir to the Barony of Tyrone outlawed, 1688 and extinct, 1704; Earldom of Tyrone (2nd creation) and Viscount Decies extinct, 1704
Viscount Tyrone and Baron Beresford (1st creation), of Beresford, in the County of Cavan, 1720; Earl of Tyrone (3rd creation), 1746	Baron La Poer retrospectively granted, 1767
Marcus Beresford; 1694–1763; 1st Earl of Tyrone, Viscount Tyrone, and Baron Beresford of Beresford, 4th Baronet	Katherine Power d. 1769; Baroness La Poer
Baron Tyrone, 1786; Marquess of Waterford, 1789	Baron Decies, of Decies in the County of Waterford, 1812
George Beresford; 1735–1800; 1st Marquess of Waterford and Baron Tyrone, 2nd Earl of Tyrone, Viscount Tyrone, and Baron Beresford of Beresford, Baron La Poer, 5th Baronet	William Beresford, 1st Baron Decies; 1743–1819; 1st Baron Decies
Beresford, later Beresford-Peirse baronets of Bagnall, 1814	Baron Beresford (2nd creation), of Albuera and Dungarvan in the County of Waterford, 1814; Viscount Beresford, of Beresford in the County of Stafford, 1823
Henry Beresford; 1772–1826; 2nd Marquess of Waterford and Baron Tyrone, 3rd Earl of Tyrone, Viscount Tyrone, and Baron Beresford of Beresford, Baron La Poer, 6th Baronet	John Poo Beresford; 1766–1844; 1st Baronet of Bagnall	William Carr Beresford; 1768–1854; 1st Viscount Beresford and Baron Beresford of Albuera and Dungarvan	Louisa Beresford d. 1851	John Horsley-Beresford; 1774–1865; 2nd Baron Decies
Viscountcy Beresford and Barony Beresford of Albuera and Dungarvan extinct, 1844
Henry Beresford; 1811–1859; 3rd Marquess of Waterford and Baron Tyrone, 4th Earl of Tyrone, Viscount Tyrone, and Baron Beresford of Beresford, Baron La Poer, 7th Baronet	John Beresford; 1814–1866; 4th Marquess of Waterford and Baron Tyrone, 5th Earl of Tyrone, Viscount Tyrone, and Baron Beresford of Beresford, Baron La Poer, 8th Baronet	George de la Poer Beresford; 1811–1873; 2nd Baronet of Bagnall	William Robert John Horsley Beresford; 1811–1893; 3rd Baron Decies
Baron Beresford (3rd creation) of Metemmeh and Curraghmore in the County of Waterford, 1916
John Henry Beresford; 1844–1895; 5th Marquess of Waterford and Baron Tyrone, 6th Earl of Tyrone, Viscount Tyrone, and Baron Beresford of Beresford, Baron La Poer, 9th Baronet	Charles William de la Poer Beresford; 1846–1919; Baron Beresford of Metemmeh and Curraghmore	Henry Monson de la Poer Beresford-Peirse; 1850–1926; 3rd Baronet of Bagnall	William Marcus de la Poer Horsley Beresford; 1865–1910; 4th Baron Decies	John Graham Hope Horsley de la Poer Beresford; 1866–1944; 5th Baron Decies
Barony Beresford (3rd creation) extinct, 1919
Henry Beresford; 1875–1911; 6th Marquess of Waterford and Baron Tyrone, 7th Earl of Tyrone, Viscount Tyrone, and Baron Beresford of Beresford, Baron La Poer, 10th Baronet	Henry Bernard de la Poer Beresford-Peirse; 1875–1949; 4th Baronet of Bagnall
John Charles Beresford; 1901–1934; 7th Marquess of Waterford and Baron Tyrone, 8th Earl of Tyrone, Viscount Tyrone, and Baron Beresford of Beresford, Baron La Poer, 11th Baronet	Henry Campbell de la Poer Beresford-Peirse; 1905–1972; 5th Baronet of Bagnall	Arthur George Marcus Douglas de la Poer Beresford; 1915–1992; 6th Baron Decies
John Hubert Beresford; 1933–2015; 8th Marquess of Waterford and Baron Tyrone, 9th Earl of Tyrone, Viscount Tyrone, and Baron Beresford of Beresford, Baron La Poer, 12th Baronet	Henry Grant de la Poer Beresford-Peirse; 1933–2013; 6th Baronet of Bagnall	Marcus Hugh Tristram de la Poer Beresford b. 1948; 7th Baron Decies
Henry Nicholas Beresford b. 1958; 9th Marquess of Waterford and Baron Tyrone, 10th Earl of Tyrone, Viscount Tyrone, and Baron Beresford of Beresford, Baron La Poer, 13th Baronet	Henry Njers de la Poer Beresford-Peirse b. 1969; 7th Baronet of Bagnall
Richard John Beresford b. 1987 styled Earl of Tyrone	Harry Tamlyn de la Poer Beresford-Peirse b. 2007	Robert Marcus Duncan de la Poer Beresford b. 1988
Heir apparent to the Marquessate of Waterford	Heir apparent to the Barony Decies	Heir apparent to the Barony Decies
