= Baron Beresford =

Extinct barony in the Peerage of the United Kingdom

Baron Beresford is a title that was created three times for the Beresford family, once in the Peerage of Ireland and later also two in the Peerage of the United Kingdom. In all instances it was created for men who were eminent politicians or soldiers. The first creation still exists as a subsidiary title, but the latter two became extinct at the death of their original holder.

== Baron Beresford, first creation (1720 – present) ==
The first creation was for Sir Marcus Beresford, 4th Baronet. In 1715, he entered the Irish House of Commons, sitting for Coleraine until 1720, when he was raised to the Peerage of Ireland with the title Baron Beresford, of Beresford, in the County of Cavan, and further as Viscount Tyrone by King George I of Great Britain. A year later, he joined the Irish House of Lords. In 1736, he became Grandmaster of the Grand Lodge of Ireland, serving for the next two years. Beresford was further honoured in 1746, when he was created Earl of Tyrone. With the death of the 1st Earl of Tyrone, all his titles were inherited by George Beresford in 1763. He was Governor of Waterford from 1766 and custos rotulorum of that county from 1769 to 1800, during which time he was made a Knight of St Patrick, created Baron Tyrone in the Peerage of Great Britain in 1786 and elevated as a Marquess of Waterford in 1789. The title Baron Beresford is still extant and held by the Marquesses of Waterford as a subsidiary title.

== Baron Beresford, second creation (1814–1854) ==
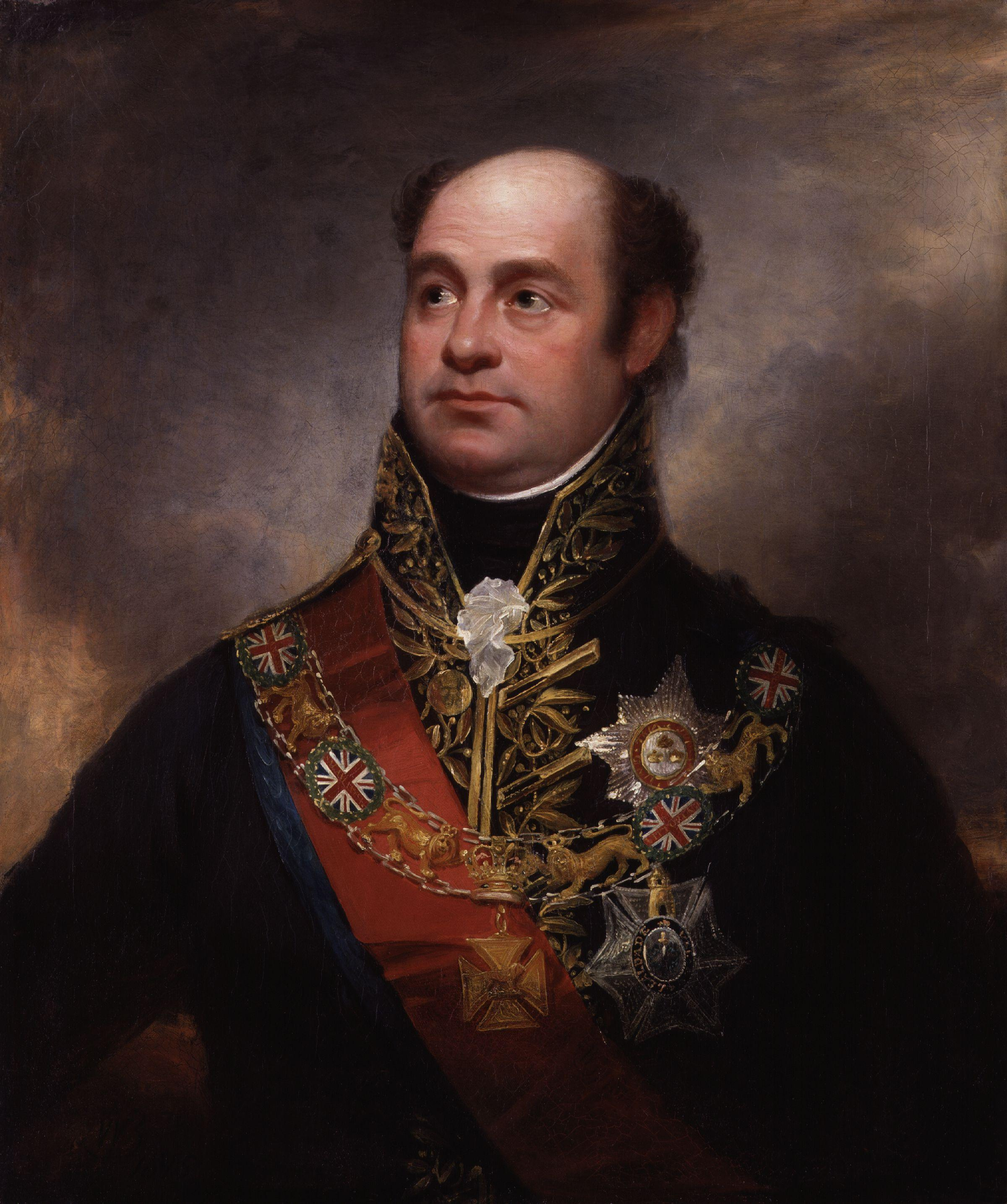
William Beresford (1768–1856). Portrait of Lord Beresford by Sir William Beechey, 1815.

The second creation was for General William Carr Beresford, GCB, GCH, GCTE (1768–1856) as Baron Beresford, of Albuera and Dungarvan in the County of Waterford of the Peerage of the United Kingdom, and was announced on 3 May 1814. He was an illegitimate son of the 1st Marquess of Waterford. William Beresford entered the British Army in 1785 and the next year he was blinded in one eye in an accident. In 1807 he was sent on a mission to Portugal. Later a general in the British Army and a marshal in the Portuguese army, he fought with the Duke of Wellington in the Peninsular War. For his services in Portugal he was created Count of Trancoso on 13 May 1811 and also Marquis of Campo Maior on 17 December 1812, both by decree of Prince Regent John. In the UK, Beresford was Member of Parliament for County Waterford from 1811 to 1814 until he was raised to the Peerage of the United Kingdom as Baron Beresford in 1814 and thus entered the House of Lords. In 1823 he was further made Viscount Beresford, of Beresford in the County of Stafford in the same peerage. After his permanent return to Britain, he held the office of Master-General of the Ordnance in 1828 in Wellington's first ministry. In 1832 he married his first cousin Louisa, daughter of William Beresford, 1st Baron Decies and Elizabeth Fitzgibbon. The marriage was childless. Lord Beresford died in 1854 at the age of 85, and thereby his titles became extinct. He was also the last titular Governor of Jersey; Since his death the Crown has been represented in Jersey by the Lieutenant Governor of Jersey.

== Baron Beresford, third creation (1916–1919) ==
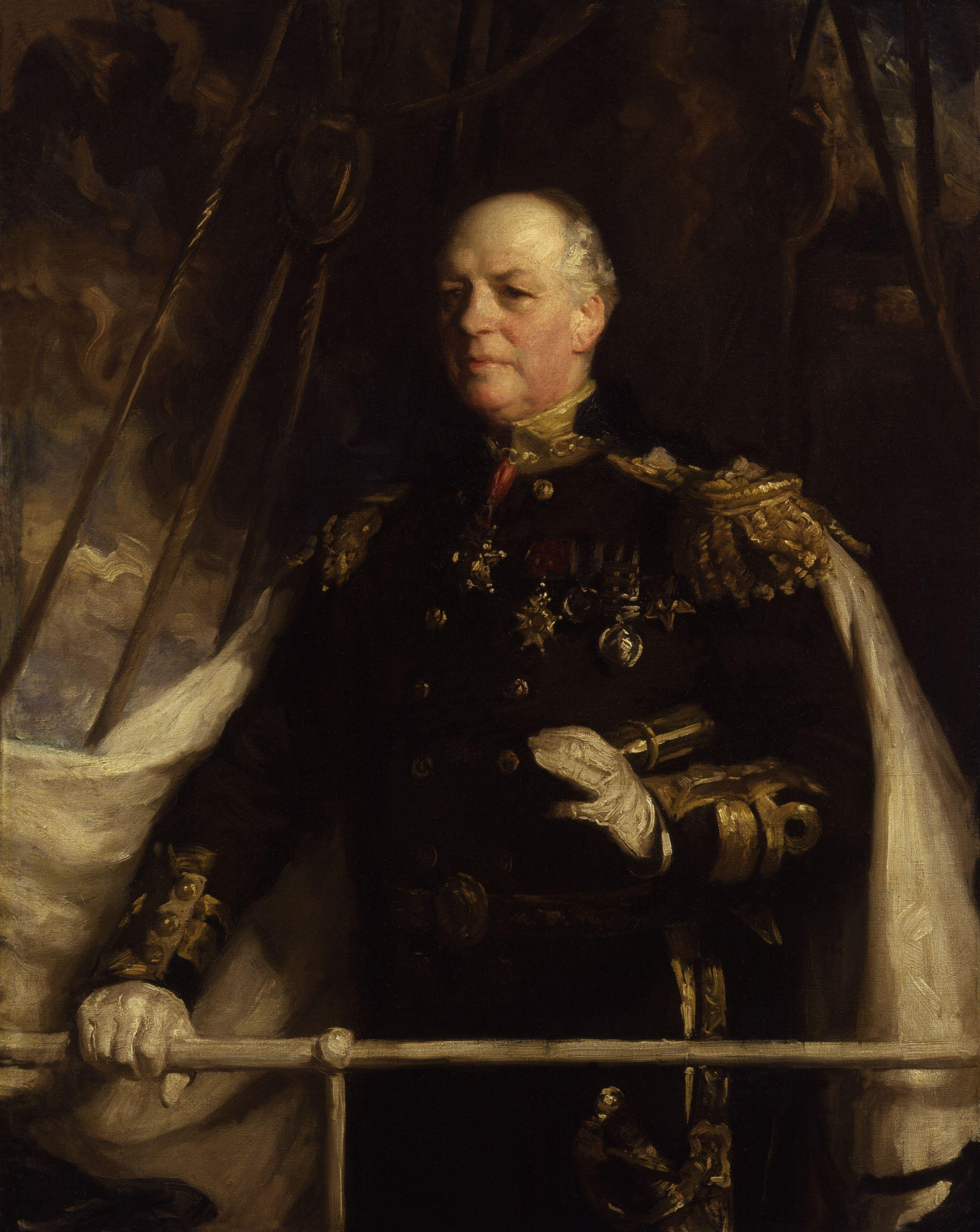
Charles Beresford (1846–1919), painted by Charles Wellington Furse

The third creation was for Admiral Lord Charles William Beresford, GCB, GCVO (1846–1919) as Baron Beresford, of Metemmeh and Curraghmore in the County of Waterford of the Peerage of the United Kingdom, and was announced on 28 January 1916. As the second son of the 4th Marquess of Waterford he was styled "Lord Charles William Beresford" between 1859 and 1916. He was the great-nephew of William Beresford (above). He combined careers in the Royal Navy and as a Member of Parliament, serving for many years in both capacities: He was MP for County Waterford from 1874–1880, for Marylebone East from 1885–1889, for Member of Parliament for City of York from 1898–1900, for Woolwich from 1902–1903 and for Portsmouth from Jan. 1910–1916. In the navy, he held the posts of Junior Naval Lord from 1886–1888, Commander-in-Chief, Channel Fleet from 1903–1905,Commander-in-Chief, Mediterranean Fleet from 1905–1907 and Commander-in-Chief, Channel Fleet from 1907–1909. His later career was marked by a longstanding dispute with Admiral of the Fleet Sir John Fisher, over reforms championed by Fisher introducing new technology and sweeping away traditional practices. Beresford retired from the navy in 1911 with the rank of admiral and remained a Member of the House of Commons until 1916. In 1878 he married Ellen Jeromina (Mina) Gardner, daughter of Richard Gardner and Lucy Mandesloh. They had two daughters. Lord Beresford died in 1919 at the age of 73, and his title became extinct.

== Family tree ==
Family tree of the Marquess of Waterford and related titles

Baron Power, of Curraghmore, 1535
Richard Power d. 1539; 1st Baron Power of Curraghmore
Piers Power d. 1545; 2nd Baron Power of Curraghmore	John Power; 1516–1592; 3rd Baron Power of Curraghmore
Richard Power d. 1607; 4th Baron Power of Curraghmore
Baronet of Coleraine in the County of Londonderry, 1665
Tristram Beresford d. 1673; 1st Baronet	John Power d. 1661; 5th Baron Power of Curraghmore
Earl of Tyrone and Viscount Decies (2nd creation), 1673
Randal Beresford d. 1681; 2nd Baronet	Richard Power; 1630–1690; 1st Earl of Tyrone, etc., 6th Baron Power
Tristram Beresford; 1669–1701; 3rd Baronet	John Power c. 1665–1693; 2nd Earl of Tyrone, etc., 7th Baron Power	James Power; 1667–1704; 3rd Earl of Tyrone, etc., 8th Baron Power
Heir to the Barony of Tyrone outlawed, 1688 and extinct, 1704; Earldom of Tyrone (2nd creation) and Viscount Decies extinct, 1704
Viscount Tyrone and Baron Beresford (1st creation), of Beresford, in the County of Cavan, 1720; Earl of Tyrone (3rd creation), 1746	Baron La Poer retrospectively granted, 1767
Marcus Beresford; 1694–1763; 1st Earl of Tyrone, etc., 4th Baronet	Katherine Power d. 1769; Baroness La Poer
Baron Tyrone, 1786; Marquess of Waterford, 1789	Baron Decies, of Decies in the County of Waterford, 1812
George Beresford; 1735–1800; 1st Marquess of Waterford, etc., 2nd Earl of Tyrone, etc., 5th Baronet	William Beresford, 1st Baron Decies; 1743–1819; 1st Baron Decies
Beresford, later Beresford-Peirse baronets of Bagnall, 1814	Baron Beresford (2nd creation), of Albuera and Dungarvan in the County of Waterford, 1814; Viscount Beresford, of Beresford in the County of Stafford, 1823
Henry Beresford; 1772–1826; 2nd Marquess of Waterford, etc., 3rd Earl of Tyrone, etc., 6th Baronet	John Poo Beresford; 1766–1844; 1st Baronet of Bagnall	William Carr Beresford; 1768–1854; 1st Viscount Beresford, etc.	Louisa Beresford d. 1851	John Horsley-Beresford; 1774–1865; 2nd Baron Decies
Viscountcy Beresford and Barony Beresford of Albuera and Dungarvan extinct, 1844
Henry Beresford; 1811–1859; 3rd Marquess of Waterford, etc., 4th Earl of Tyrone, etc., 7th Baronet	John Beresford; 1814–1866; 4th Marquess of Waterford, etc., 5th Earl of Tyrone, etc., 8th Baronet	George de la Poer Beresford; 1811–1873; 2nd Baronet of Bagnall	William Robert John Horsley Beresford; 1811–1893; 3rd Baron Decies
Baron Beresford (3rd creation) of Metemmeh and Curraghmore in the County of Waterford, 1916
John Henry Beresford; 1844–1895; 5th Marquess of Waterford, etc., 6th Earl of Tyrone, etc., 9th Baronet	Charles William de la Poer Beresford; 1846–1919; Baron Beresford of Metemmeh and Curraghmore	Henry Monson de la Poer Beresford-Peirse; 1850–1926; 3rd Baronet of Bagnall	William Marcus de la Poer Horsley Beresford; 1865–1910; 4th Baron Decies	John Graham Hope Horsley de la Poer Beresford; 1866–1944; 5th Baron Decies
Barony Beresford (3rd creation) extinct, 1919
Henry Beresford; 1875–1911; 6th Marquess of Waterford, etc., 7th Earl of Tyrone, etc., 10th Baronet	Henry Bernard de la Poer Beresford-Peirse; 1875–1949; 4th Baronet of Bagnall
John Charles Beresford; 1901–1934; 7th Marquess of Waterford, etc., 8th Earl of Tyrone, etc., 11th Baronet	Henry Campbell de la Poer Beresford-Peirse; 1905–1972; 5th Baronet of Bagnall	Arthur George Marcus Douglas de la Poer Beresford; 1915–1992; 6th Baron Decies
John Hubert Beresford; 1933–2015; 8th Marquess of Waterford, etc., 9th Earl of Tyrone, etc., 12th Baronet	Henry Grant de la Poer Beresford-Peirse; 1933–2013; 6th Baronet of Bagnall	Marcus Hugh Tristram de la Poer Beresford b. 1948; 7th Baron Decies
Henry Nicholas Beresford b. 1958; 9th Marquess of Waterford, etc., 10th Earl of Tyrone, etc., 13th Baronet	Henry Njers de la Poer Beresford-Peirse b. 1969; 7th Baronet of Bagnall
Richard John Beresford b. 1987 styled Earl of Tyrone	Harry Tamlyn de la Poer Beresford-Peirse b. 2007	Robert Marcus Duncan de la Poer Beresford b. 1988
Heir apparent to the Marquessate of Waterford	Heir apparent to the Barony Decies	Heir apparent to the Barony Decies
