= Marquess of Waterford =

Title in the peerage of Ireland

Marquessate of Waterford
- Arms: Quarterly, 1st and 4th, Argent crusilly fitchce, three Fleurs- de-lis within a bordure engrailed Sable (Beresford); 2nd and 3rd, Argent a Chief indented Sable, (La Poer). Crest: A Dragon's Head erased Azure, pierced through the neck with a broken Spear Or, the broken point Argent, thrust through he upper jaw. Supporters: On either side an Angel proper, vested Argent, crined and winged Or, holding in the exterior hand a Sword erect proper.
- Creation date: 19 August 1789
- Created by: George III
- Peerage: Peerage of Ireland
- First holder: George Beresford, 2nd Earl of Tyrone
- Present holder: Henry Beresford, 9th Marquess of Waterford
- Heir apparent: Richard John de la Poer Beresford, Earl of Tyrone
- Remainder to: The 1st Marquess' heirs male of the body lawfully begotten
- Subsidiary titles: Earl of Tyrone; Viscount Tyrone; Viscount Decies; Baron La Poer; Baron Beresford; Baron Tyrone of Haverfordwest; Baronet 'of Coleraine'
- Status: Extant
- Seats: Curraghmore; Glenbride Lodge
- Former seats: Ford Castle; Tyrone House; Castle Gurteen de la Poer; Highcliffe Castle
- Motto: NIL NISI CRUCE (Nothing unless by the Cross)

Marquess of Waterford is a title in the Peerage of Ireland and the premier marquessate in that peerage. It was created in 1789 for the Anglo-Irish politician George Beresford, 2nd Earl of Tyrone. The title is presently held by Henry Beresford, 9th Marquess of Waterford.

== History ==
The progenitor of the family was a companion of Strongbow, from whom he obtained grant for extensive lands in Waterford in the 11th century.[1] The barony was created in 1535 for Sir Richard le Poer.

James Power, 3rd Earl of Tyrone, who was also the 8th Baron Power, held both his titles by letters patent (dated 1535 and 1637 respectively), which specified that the titles would be inherited by heirs male of the grantee. When he died in 1704 however, his only child was a daughter, Lady Catharine Power. Lady Catharine therefore inherited the land. Lady Catharine grew up and married in 1717 an Irish politician, Sir Marcus Beresford, 4th Baronet.[3] After a lawsuit with John Power, Sir Marcus and Lady Catharine retained the Power property, and Sir Marcus was raised into the peerage of Ireland by creating him Viscount Tyrone in 1720. In 1720, he was created both Baron Beresford, of Beresford, in the County of Cavan, and Viscount Tyrone in the peerage of Ireland. After the Jacobite rebellion of 1745, he was further elevated in 1746 as Earl of Tyrone in the peerage of Ireland (the same name of title as that of his father-in-law, but a new creation). In 1767, four years after his death, the Dowager Countess of Tyrone was confirmed with the hereditary peerage title Baroness La Poer in the peerage of Ireland (created by writ ca. 1650). Lord Tyrone was succeeded by his fourth but eldest surviving son, the second Earl, who also inherited the title Baron La Poer from his mother in 1769. In 1786 he was created Baron Tyrone, of Haverfordwest in the County of Pembroke, in the peerage of Great Britain. Three years later he was made Marquess of Waterford in the peerage of Ireland. The titles descended in the direct line until the death of his grandson, the third Marquess, in 1859. The late Marquess was succeeded by his younger brother, the fourth Marquess. As of 2015 the titles are held by the latter's great-great-great-grandson, the ninth Marquess, who succeeded his father in 2015.

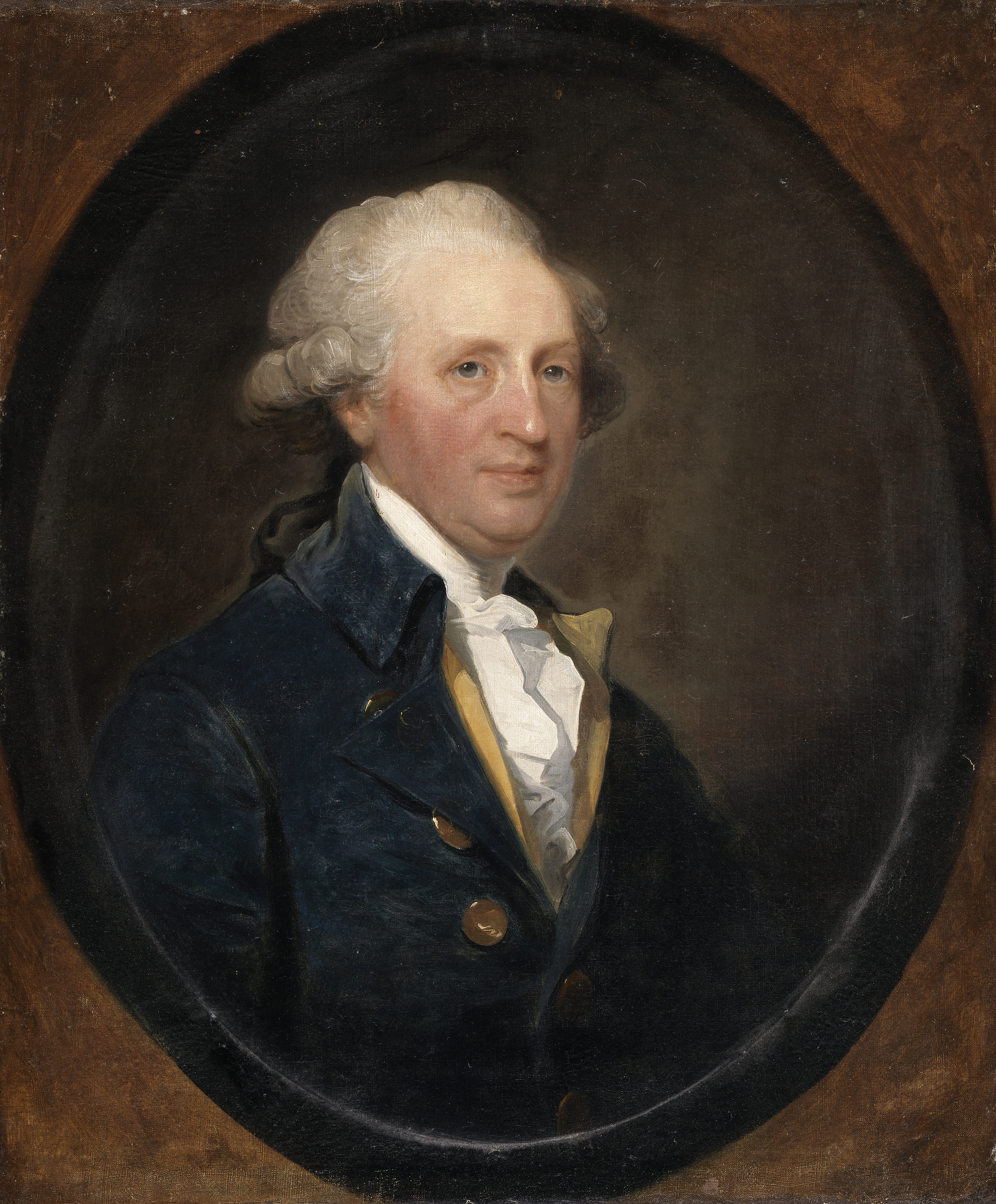
The Honourable John Beresford, younger son of the first Earl of Tyrone and one of the most influential members of the Beresford family.

Several other members of the Beresford family have also gained distinction. John Beresford, fifth son of the first Earl, was an influential statesman. Marcus Beresford, eldest son of John Beresford, represented Dungarvan in the Irish Parliament. His second son was the Conservative politician William Beresford, who was the father of Mostyn Beresford (1835–1911), a Lieutenant-General in the Army, and of Edward Marcus Beresford (1836–1896), a Major-General in the Army. The Right Reverend George Beresford, second son of John Beresford, was Bishop of Kilmore. His son the Most Reverend Marcus Beresford was Archbishop of Armagh. He was the father of George Beresford, a politician, and of Major Henry Marcus Beresford, who was the father of the photographer George Charles Beresford. John Claudius Beresford, third son of John Beresford, was a politician. William Beresford, seventh son of the first Earl, was Archbishop of Tuam and was created Baron Decies in 1812. Lord John Beresford, second surviving son of the first Marquess, was Archbishop of Armagh. Lord George Beresford, younger son of the first Marquess, was a politician. William Beresford, illegitimate son of the first Marquess, was a Field Marshal in the British Army and was created Viscount Beresford in 1823. John Beresford, illegitimate son of the first Marquess, was a soldier and politician and was created a baronet in 1814 (see Beresford-Peirse baronets). Lord Charles Beresford, second son of the fourth Marquess, was a naval commander and politician and was created Baron Beresford in 1916. Lord William Beresford, third son of the fourth Marquess, was a soldier and recipient of the Victoria Cross. Lord Marcus Beresford, fourth son of the fourth Marquess, was a courtier. The Henry Beresford, 3rd Marquess of Waterford enjoyed partying as much as sport. He was one of several wild sportsmen who sprayed the tollgate and houses of Melton Mowbray with red paint. The phrase “painting the town red” was born.

The eldest son of the Marquess is styled with the courtesy title Earl of Tyrone and the Earl's eldest son as Lord Le Poer. Additionally, the Marquess club is White's, where the family have been members since the 18th century. The family seat is Curraghmore, near Portlaw, County Waterford, in the Republic of Ireland. The Beresford family, owned land in various parts of Ireland, including almost 40,000 acres in county Waterford, 26,000 in county Wicklow and over 4,500 acres in county Leitrim. The family remain amongst the largest land owners in all Ireland.

All but the 4th Lord Waterford was awarded the Order of Saint Patrick. The 6th Lord Waterford was the last to receive the honour. A special treasure of the family is a necklace of pearls, once the property of Mary Queen of Scots, who gave it to Mary Hamilton the night before the Queen’s execution.

Not to be confused with the ancient title (created in 1446 and still extant) of Earl of Waterford (also in the peerage of Ireland) of the Earl of Shrewsbury (the Earl of Waterford is also Lord High Steward of Ireland).

== Beresford baronets, of Colerain (1665–present) ==
- Sir Tristram Beresford, 1st Baronet (died 1673)
- Sir Randal Beresford, 2nd Baronet (died 1681)
- Sir Tristram Beresford, 3rd Baronet (1669–1701)
- Sir Marcus Beresford, 4th Baronet (1694–1763) (created Baron Beresford and Viscount Tyrone in 1720, and elevated to Earl of Tyrone in 1746)

== Earls of Tyrone (1746–present) ==
- Marcus Beresford, 1st Earl of Tyrone (1694–1763)
- George de La Poer Beresford, 2nd Earl of Tyrone (1735–1800) (received the peerage Baron La Poer in 1769, created Baron Tyrone in 1786, and elevated to Marquess of Waterford in 1789)

== Marquesses of Waterford (1789–present) ==
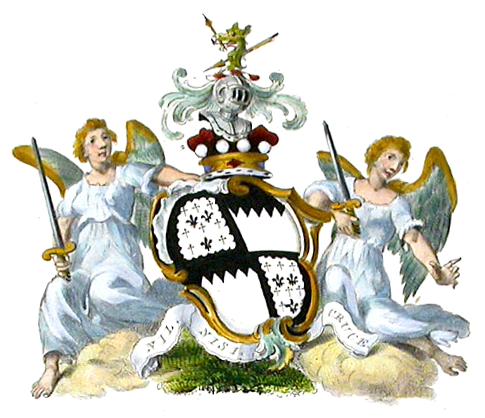
Arms of the Marquess of Waterford (shown with a Baron's Coronet).

- George de La Poer Beresford, 1st Marquess of Waterford (1735–1800)
- Henry de La Poer Beresford, 2nd Marquess of Waterford (1772–1826)
- Henry de La Poer Beresford, 3rd Marquess of Waterford (1811–1859)
- John de La Poer Beresford, 4th Marquess of Waterford (1814–1866)
- John Henry de La Poer Beresford, 5th Marquess of Waterford (1844–1895)
- Henry de La Poer Beresford, 6th Marquess of Waterford (1875–1911)
- John Charles de La Poer Beresford, 7th Marquess of Waterford (1901–1934)
- John Hubert de La Poer Beresford, 8th Marquess of Waterford (1933–2015)
- Henry Beresford, 9th Marquess of Waterford (born 1958)

== Present peer ==
Henry Nicholas de la Poer Beresford, 9th Marquess of Waterford (born 23 March 1958) is the son of the 8th Marquess of Waterford and his wife Lady Caroline Olein Geraldine Wyndham-Quin.

Educated at Harrow, in 1986 he married Amanda Thompson, a daughter of Norman Thompson, and they have three children:

- Richard John Beresford, Earl of Tyrone (born 1987)
- Lord Marcus Patrick Beresford (born 1990)
- Lady Camilla Juliet Beresford (born 1995)

He succeeded to the peerages and the Curraghmore House estate on the death of his father in 2015.

Waterford has divided his life between Ireland and England, where he managed farms, stables, and polo teams. His oldest son and heir apparent is his son Richard John de la Poer Beresford, Earl of Tyrone (born 1987), a polo professional who is known as Richard Le Poer.

== Family tree ==
Family tree of the Marquess of Waterford and related titles

Baron Power, of Curraghmore, 1535
Richard Power d. 1539; 1st Baron Power of Curraghmore
Piers Power d. 1545; 2nd Baron Power of Curraghmore	John Power; 1516–1592; 3rd Baron Power of Curraghmore
Richard Power d. 1607; 4th Baron Power of Curraghmore
Baronet of Coleraine in the County of Londonderry, 1665
Tristram Beresford d. 1673; 1st Baronet	John Power d. 1661; 5th Baron Power of Curraghmore
Earl of Tyrone and Viscount Decies (2nd creation), 1673
Randal Beresford d. 1681; 2nd Baronet	Richard Power; 1630–1690; 1st Earl of Tyrone, etc., 6th Baron Power
Tristram Beresford; 1669–1701; 3rd Baronet	John Power c. 1665–1693; 2nd Earl of Tyrone, etc., 7th Baron Power	James Power; 1667–1704; 3rd Earl of Tyrone, etc., 8th Baron Power
Heir to the Barony of Tyrone outlawed, 1688 and extinct, 1704; Earldom of Tyrone (2nd creation) and Viscount Decies extinct, 1704
Viscount Tyrone and Baron Beresford (1st creation), of Beresford, in the County of Cavan, 1720; Earl of Tyrone (3rd creation), 1746	Baron La Poer retrospectively granted, 1767
Marcus Beresford; 1694–1763; 1st Earl of Tyrone, etc., 4th Baronet	Katherine Power d. 1769; Baroness La Poer
Baron Tyrone, 1786; Marquess of Waterford, 1789	Baron Decies, of Decies in the County of Waterford, 1812
George Beresford; 1735–1800; 1st Marquess of Waterford, etc., 2nd Earl of Tyrone, etc., 5th Baronet	William Beresford, 1st Baron Decies; 1743–1819; 1st Baron Decies
Beresford, later Beresford-Peirse baronets of Bagnall, 1814	Baron Beresford (2nd creation), of Albuera and Dungarvan in the County of Waterford, 1814; Viscount Beresford, of Beresford in the County of Stafford, 1823
Henry Beresford; 1772–1826; 2nd Marquess of Waterford, etc., 3rd Earl of Tyrone, etc., 6th Baronet	John Poo Beresford; 1766–1844; 1st Baronet of Bagnall	William Carr Beresford; 1768–1854; 1st Viscount Beresford, etc.	Louisa Beresford d. 1851	John Horsley-Beresford; 1774–1865; 2nd Baron Decies
Viscountcy Beresford and Barony Beresford of Albuera and Dungarvan extinct, 1844
Henry Beresford; 1811–1859; 3rd Marquess of Waterford, etc., 4th Earl of Tyrone, etc., 7th Baronet	John Beresford; 1814–1866; 4th Marquess of Waterford, etc., 5th Earl of Tyrone, etc., 8th Baronet	George de la Poer Beresford; 1811–1873; 2nd Baronet of Bagnall	William Robert John Horsley Beresford; 1811–1893; 3rd Baron Decies
Baron Beresford (3rd creation) of Metemmeh and Curraghmore in the County of Waterford, 1916
John Henry Beresford; 1844–1895; 5th Marquess of Waterford, etc., 6th Earl of Tyrone, etc., 9th Baronet	Charles William de la Poer Beresford; 1846–1919; Baron Beresford of Metemmeh and Curraghmore	Henry Monson de la Poer Beresford-Peirse; 1850–1926; 3rd Baronet of Bagnall	William Marcus de la Poer Horsley Beresford; 1865–1910; 4th Baron Decies	John Graham Hope Horsley de la Poer Beresford; 1866–1944; 5th Baron Decies
Barony Beresford (3rd creation) extinct, 1919
Henry Beresford; 1875–1911; 6th Marquess of Waterford, etc., 7th Earl of Tyrone, etc., 10th Baronet	Henry Bernard de la Poer Beresford-Peirse; 1875–1949; 4th Baronet of Bagnall
John Charles Beresford; 1901–1934; 7th Marquess of Waterford, etc., 8th Earl of Tyrone, etc., 11th Baronet	Henry Campbell de la Poer Beresford-Peirse; 1905–1972; 5th Baronet of Bagnall	Arthur George Marcus Douglas de la Poer Beresford; 1915–1992; 6th Baron Decies
John Hubert Beresford; 1933–2015; 8th Marquess of Waterford, etc., 9th Earl of Tyrone, etc., 12th Baronet	Henry Grant de la Poer Beresford-Peirse; 1933–2013; 6th Baronet of Bagnall	Marcus Hugh Tristram de la Poer Beresford b. 1948; 7th Baron Decies
Henry Nicholas Beresford b. 1958; 9th Marquess of Waterford, etc., 10th Earl of Tyrone, etc., 13th Baronet	Henry Njers de la Poer Beresford-Peirse b. 1969; 7th Baronet of Bagnall
Richard John Beresford b. 1987 styled Earl of Tyrone	Harry Tamlyn de la Poer Beresford-Peirse b. 2007	Robert Marcus Duncan de la Poer Beresford b. 1988
Heir apparent to the Marquessate of Waterford	Heir apparent to the Barony Decies	Heir apparent to the Barony Decies

Line of succession (simplified)
- John Beresford, 7th Marquess of Waterford (1901–1934)
  - John Beresford, 8th Marquess of Waterford (1933–2015)
    - Henry Beresford, 9th Marquess of Waterford (born 1958)
      - (1). Richard John de la Poer Beresford, Earl of Tyrone (born 1987)
      - (2). Lord Marcus Patrick de la Poer (born 1990)
    - (3). Lord Charles Richard de la Poer Beresford (born 1960)
      - (4). William Thady de la Poer Beresford (born 1990)
      - (5). Thomas Charles de la Poer Beresford (born 1996)
    - (6). Lord James Patrick de la Poer Beresford (born 1965)
  - Lord Patrick Tristam de la Poer Beresford (1934–2020)
    - male issue and descendants in remainder

There are further male heirs in line to the earldom of Tyrone and its subsidiary titles, who are descended from the younger sons of the 1st earl.

== See also ==
- Baron Beresford
- Baron Decies
- Baron La Poer
- Beresford-Peirse baronets
- Earl of Tyrone
- Viscount Beresford
