= Earl of Tyrone =

Irish peerage

- Arms: Quarterly, 1st and 4th, Argent crusilly fitchce, three Fleurs- de-lis within a bordure engrailed Sable (Beresford); 2nd and 3rd, Argent a Chief indented Sable, (La Poer). Crest: A Dragon's Head erased Azure, pierced through the neck with a broken Spear Or, the broken point Argent, thrust through he upper jaw. Supporters: On either side an Angel proper, vested Argent, crined and winged Or, holding in the exterior hand a Sword erect proper.
- Creation date: 1 July 1746 (third creation)
- Created by: George II
- Peerage: Peerage of Ireland
- First holder: Marcus Beresford, 1st Viscount Tyrone
- Present holder: Richard de la Poer Beresford, Earl of Tyrone
- Remainder to: The 1st Earls' heirs male of the body lawfully begotten
- Subsidiary titles: Viscount Tyrone; Viscount Decies; Baron La Poer; Baron Beresford; Baron Tyrone of Haverfordwest; Baronet 'of Coleraine'
- Status: Extant
- Seats: Curraghmore; Glenbride Lodge
- Former seat: Tyrone House
- Motto: NIL NISI CRUCE "(Nothing unless by the Cross)"

The Earl of Tyrone is a title created three times in the Peerage of Ireland, and once in the Spanish nobility. They claim descent of the Irish high king Niall of the Nine Hostages. It was created for the final time in 1746 for Marcus Beresford, 1st Viscount Tyrone, son-in-law of the last de Poer earls. His son was created Marquess of Waterford in 1789, and the title has since been a subsidiary title of the Waterford title.

It was first created as part of the Tudor attempt to establish a uniform social structure in Ireland by converting the Gaelic kings and chiefs into hereditary nobles of the Kingdom of Ireland. Under brehon law, clans were effectively independent, and chose their chiefs from the members of a bloodline – normally, but not always, a close relative of the previous chief; the clan as a whole generally had a voice in the chief's decisions. Also, acknowledged sons of a clan member were members of the bloodline, even when not begotten in lawful marriage. The holder of a title, on the other hand, was subject to the Crown, but held his lands by hereditary right, which the Crown would help to enforce; the rest of the clan were usually now his tenants. Illegitimate sons had no right of succession under the new system unless expressly granted.

The title in the Peerage of Ireland was created again in 1673 for Richard Power, 6th Baron Power, the Anglo-Norman peer and Restoration politician, along with a large grant of land in County Waterford, at the other end of Ireland. He was also given the subordinate title of Viscount Decies; both titles became extinct upon the death of his younger son, the third earl, in 1704; he left an only daughter, Lady Katherine Power, but both titles descended by patent to male heirs only.

== Earls of Tyrone, first creation (1542) ==
The king and chief of the O'Neills of Tyrone, Conn Bacach O'Neill, went to Greenwich and submitted to Henry VIII of England and of Ireland in 1542; he renounced the style of "The O'Neill" and his independent rule. In exchange, he was created Earl of Tyrone, which was by the charter to descend to his illegitimate son Matthew or Ferdoragh O'Neill, who was also created Baron of Dungannon, which was always to be held by the heir to the Earldom; this was a substantive title, which gave Ferdoragh a seat in the Irish House of Lords, not a courtesy title. This adaptive process, known as "surrender and regrant", was taken up by other Irish clan chiefs.

This passed over Conn's legitimate sons; the eldest, Shane O'Neill, was only about twelve at the time. When he grew up, Shane (who is remembered as Séan an Diomais, or "Shane the Proud") drove his father out of Ulster, and was inaugurated The O'Neill (in Irish: Uí Neíll). There was civil strife among the Cenell Eoghain; Shane was victorious, Ferdoragh was killed, Conn was permanently driven out of Tyrone, and died in the Irish Pale in 1559, the area of Ireland directly governed by the English.

In English law, Ferdoragh's eldest son, Brian O'Neill, then succeeded to the Earldom; in practice he continued to be called Lord Dungannon. Queen Elizabeth I, newly come to the throne, proposed to recognize Shane as Earl, since he actually ruled Tyrone and was the eldest legitimate son; but the negotiations collapsed. Brian was killed in 1562, while still young and unmarried, by his cousin Turlough O'Neill, the tanist of his uncle Shane (and a grandson of the brother of Conn Bacagh, the first Earl). Shane died in June 1567, whereupon the English generally supported Brian's younger brother Hugh O'Neill against Turlough Linneach O'Neill. But Turlough was inaugurated The O'Neill Mor and as leader of the clan, was perceived to be the greater threat to English control of Ireland. In 1585, Hugh was recognized as Earl of Tyrone. In 1593, Turlough surrendered to him the position of "The O'Neill" to the Earl and retired.

Hugh O'Neill's career as unquestioned leader of the O'Neills became a series of quarrels with the English government: like many great feudal lords, he rebelled in the Nine Years' War, was proclaimed a traitor, and ultimately submitted to the Crown at the Treaty of Mellifont in 1603. Despite the Anglo-Spanish peace treaty of 1604, in 1607 O'Neill, his brother-in-law the Earl of Tyrconnell, and several of their followers fled to Europe, expecting the Spanish to invade Ireland with an army. He was found guilty of treason the year after this Flight of the Earls. The attainder was confirmed by the Parliament of Ireland in 1614; at which point the Earldom became forfeit under the common law.

Notwithstanding this attaintment, Earl Hugh, followed by his sons, continued to claim to be Earl of Tyrone, through its recognition by the Pope and the King of Spain, until the last legitimate grandson died unmarried, in 1692. Irish marriage practices at the time allowed for a political divorce, but all children were considered legitimate by the Irish: Hugh was married four times. Historians have stated that at this point the Irish title became extinct, as well as forfeit; however, that is by English law of descent. Gaelic law allowed for chiefships and property to descend through tanistry, and thus the descendants of Earl Hugh's brothers acted as The O'Neills of Tyrone, and called themselves Earl of Tyrone by Spanish grant, for the rest of the century. At that point, the chiefship and property transferred to the O'Neill of Tyrone existent back in Ireland through the descendants of Prince Shane O'Neill.

Heirs who did not live to succeed are indented.

- Conn O'Neill, 1st Earl of Tyrone(c. 1484–1559)
  - Matthew O'Neill, 1st Baron Dungannon (c. 1520–1550)
- Brian O'Neill, Baron Dungannon, 2nd Baron Dungannon (c. 1540–1562)
- Hugh O'Neill 3rd Baron Dungannon, 2nd or 3rd Earl of Tyrone. (c. 1550–1616) attainted 1608, attainder confirmed by Irish Parliament 1614.
  - Hugh O'Neill, 4th Baron Dungannon (c. 1586–1609) attainted 1608.

=== Baron Dungannon ===
The Barony of Dungannon created for Matthew or Ferdoragh O'Neill was limited, by the terms of the patent, to his descendants who were heirs apparent to the Earldom of Tyrone. This provision would have meant that it acted like a courtesy title: when an Earl of Tyrone had an eldest son, or an eldest grandson by a deceased eldest son, that heir would be Baron Dungannon; when there was no heir apparent, the Barony of Dungannon lapsed until there was.

So when Matthew died, his son Brian became Baron Dungannon. However, when Conn Bacach died the next year, Brien was not recognized as Earl of Tyrone, but continued to be called Baron Dungannon until he was killed by Turlough Luineach O'Neill, Shane O'Neill's tanist.

His younger brother Hugh O'Neill was called Baron of Dungannon until 1585, when he received a charter confirming him as Earl of Tyrone. The same charter confirmed his son Hugh, the eldest son of his second wife, as Baron Dungannon; Earl Hugh's first marriage was invalid, and his children by that marriage illegitimate.

The following men were known as Baron Dungannon:

- Matthew O'Neill, 1st Baron Dungannon, (c. 1510–1558), cr. 1542.
- Brian O'Neill, Baron Dungannon (died 1562), de jure Baron Dungannon 1558–9, styled Dungannon 1558–1562.
- Hugh O'Neill, Earl of Tyrone, (c. 1550 – 1616) styled Baron Dungannon 1562–1585, never de jure: before his brother's death, he was not heir apparent, for his brother could have married and had sons; after his brother's death, he was de jure Earl of Tyrone, but not Baron Dungannon by the limitation.
- Hugh O'Neill, 4th Baron Dungannon, (c. 1585 – 1609), styled Baron Dungannon, 1587–1608, de jure from birth. Recognised Baron on 10 May 1587.
- Henry O'Neill (c. 1586 – 1610), de jure 5th Baron Dungannon
- Shane O'Neill (Juan, John, Sean; 1599 – 1641), de jure 6th Baron Dungannon

The title Baron Dungannon was attainted in 1614, at the same time the title Earl of Tyrone was attainted. Therefore, Earl Hugh's two eldest sons, Henry and Shane, were de jure Barons.

=== Exiles ===
Earl Hugh and his family continued to lead the O'Neills of Tyrone from abroad; they also had the title of Earl of Tyrone recognized in Spain in the form of Conde de Tyrone. "Though no longer recognized in England, it was granted by Spanish kings to a line of O'Neills in rightful succession to the end of the seventeenth century".

- Hugh O'Neill (c. 1550–1616), the attainted Earl.
- Henry O'Neill (c. 1586–1610) Earl Hugh's son by Joan O'Donnell, his second wife; Colonel of the Irish regiment in the Spanish service in Flanders; Knight of Santiago. Accompanied his father in his flight, and was attainted 1608, confirmed 1614. He is omitted from an account of his father's family in 1617; he is noted as dead in 1621
- Shane O'Neill (Juan, John, Sean; 1599 – 1641), Earl Hugh's son by Catherine Magennis, his fourth wife. Succeeded his father as Earl of Tyrone, his brother as Colonel; Knight of Calatrava; Major Domo at Madrid, 1638; died in the Battle of Montjuïc. He was created the Viscount of Montjuich by the King of Spain upon his death.
  - His younger brothers died young: Conn (c. 1602–1627?) was left behind in the flight, went to Eton, and died in the Tower of London; Brian (c. 1604–1617) went to school in Brussels and was killed there, being found hanged with his hands bound.
- Hugo Eugenio O'Neill, his son, was legitimated at Shane's death by Philip IV of Spain but died young. Shane's will provided that Hugo Eugenio be taught Irish, so he could be an effective leader of the O'Neills; it also provided an elaborate system of succession if Hugo Eugenio died childless, as did happen.
  - Conn O'Neill (Con, Constantino, died before 1660), son of Cormac O'Neill, the younger brother of Earl Hugh who died in the Tower of London, was named as second heir in Shane O'Neill's will, if Hugo Eugenio died childless; by the law of the Kingdom of Ireland, he would be the next heir to the Earldom, if restored. Since he died before Hugo Eugenio, he does not appear to have called himself Earl, but Owen Roe O'Neill, Earl Hugh's half-nephew and a general in the War of the Three Kingdoms, acknowledged "that all the immediate right to the earldom of Tyrone belongs to Don Constantino, who is in Spain" and that while he lived, Owen Roe himself "could claim nothing".

By 1660, therefore, the Earldom of Tyrone was forfeit by English standards. Nonetheless, by Spanish and Irish standards the collateral O'Neill descendants of Mathew "Ferdocha" O'Neill, were allowed to use the title in Spain until 1692. At that point, it went to the senior member of the descendants of Prince Shane O'Neill, the half brother of Mathew "Ferdocha" O'Neill.

- Hugh Dubh O'Neill, (c. 1610 – c. 1666), nephew of Owen Roe O'Neill (by his brother Art Oge) and so grandnephew of Earl Hugh, and commander under his uncle in Ireland, where he held Limerick against Henry Ireton during a long siege. Petitioned Charles II in October 1660, after the English Restoration, to be restored to the Earldom of Tyrone.
- Hugh O'Neill (after 1644 – c. 1670), grandson of Owen Roe O'Neill by his son Henry Roe O'Neill. Knight of Calatrava 1667.
- Owen O'Neill, grandnephew of Owen Roe O'Neill, whose younger brother Con had a son Brian, father of this Owen. Educated at Rome; executor of a will 1679, died after 1689. After Owen, no-one claimed the Earldom of Tyrone until the 19th century.
- Don Bernardo O'Neill, (c. 1619 – 1681), colonel of the Irish regiment of Tyrone, nephew of General Eoghan Roe. Born in Armagh, served as a captain in Flanders starting in 1636. Fought in the War of the Confederacy, returned to Flanders and was given permission to raise and Irish regiment in 1663. In 1673, "became Earl of Tyrone after the death of Hugo, son of Henry mac Eoghain Rua". Died 1681 in Barcelona.
- Eugenio O'Neill, after the death of Don Bernardo in 1681, "the titular colonel was the eighth Earl, a young boy also called Eugenio O'Neill", he was claimed as a grandson of General Eoghan Rua through a son named Brian. He was still a minor and titulary colonel of the Regiment of Tyrone on 18 April 1689.

=== Later claimants ===
By this point, the claim to the Earldom of Tyrone became intertwined both with the position of the O'Neill of Tyrone and the wider position of chief of all the O'Neills of Ulster. Not all the claimants to the Gaelic offices claimed the Earldom: the descendants of Shane the Proud were inaugurated as the O'Neill by the ancient ritual, by which the O'Hagan put golden shoes on their feet on May Eve, without calling themselves Earls. In fact, Don Constantino or Conn McShane O'Neill went to Spain in 1681 to claim the chiefship and regiment from the King of Spain, upon the death of his cousin, Don Bernardo. He carried proofs of his senior descent from Prince Shane O'Neill, but was late to arrive. In the meantime, the King granted the estates to the minor Eugene O'Neill. This Conn went back to Ireland and was a senior member of the Jacobite O'Neills in the Williamite War.

The leadership of the O'Neills as a whole had usually been held by the O'Neills of Tyrone; but their distant cousins the O'Neills of Clanaboy or Clandeboye in Antrim had also sometimes held it, most recently Art mac Aodha O'Neill, from 1509 to 1514, when the first Earl was young. They, like the O'Neills of Tyrone, spent much of the seventeenth century fighting for the Catholic powers; in 1740 they relocated permanently to Portugal.

Don Jorge O'Neill of Clanaboy and Lisbon submitted his pedigree to the Ulster office of Heralds; in 1895 the genealogy and arms were confirmed. 1903 he received a patent from Sir Henry Farnham Burke, Somerset Herald, acknowledging that he had proved his royal descent from the Kings of Ireland, and his collateral descent from Hugh O'Neill, and thus was the representative of the Earldom and the senior member of the Royal family of O'Neill of Ulster. Although collateral descent from the grantee does not confer a peerage, he assumed the style of Conde de Tyrone, but his descendants use the title Prince of Clandeboye. Queen Victoria's recognition was followed by those of the Pope, the kings of Spain and Portugal, and the Republic of Ireland in 1945 as the Prince of Clandeboye.

== Barons Power (13 September 1535) ==
- Richard Power, 1st Baron Power (died 1539)
- Piers Power, 2nd Baron Power (died 1545)
- John Power, 3rd Baron Power (1516–1592)
- Richard Power, 4th Baron Power (died 1607)
- John Power, 5th Baron Power (c. 1599–1661)
- Richard Power, 6th Baron Power (created Earl of Tyrone and Viscount Decies in 1673)

== Earls of Tyrone, second creation (1673) ==
with subsidiaries Viscount Decies (1673) and Baron Power (1535)

- Richard Power, 1st Earl of Tyrone (1630–1690)
- John Power, 2nd Earl of Tyrone (c. 1665–1693)
- James Power, 3rd Earl of Tyrone (1667–1704) (extinct 1704; the heir to the Barony of Power had been outlawed in 1688, so it was forfeit )

== Baron Power ==
- John Power (died 1724), Mayor of Limerick
- Henry Power (1699–1742)
- John Power (died 1743)
- William Power (died 1755)
- James Power (died 1757)
- Edmond Power
- William Power (1745–1813)
- Edmond Power (1775–1830)
- John William Power (1816–1851), MP for Dungarvan and County Waterford
- Edmond James de la Poer (1841–1915), MP and High Sheriff of Waterford
- John William Rivallon de la Poer (1882–1939), Lord Lieutenant of Waterford
- Edmond Robert Arnold de la Poer
- Myles Louis George Power (born 1974)

== Earls of Tyrone, third creation (1746) ==
- Marcus Beresford, 1st Earl of Tyrone (1694–1763)
  Married 1717, Catherine, daughter of James Power, 3rd Earl of Tyrone, above; created Viscount Tyrone 1720, Earl of Tyrone 1746.
- George de La Poer Beresford, 2nd Earl of Tyrone (1735–1800), created Marquess of Waterford in 1789
- for later earls, see Marquess of Waterford

== Family tree ==
Family tree of the Marquess of Waterford and related titles

Baron Power, of Curraghmore, 1535
Richard Power d. 1539; 1st Baron Power of Curraghmore
Piers Power d. 1545; 2nd Baron Power of Curraghmore	John Power; 1516–1592; 3rd Baron Power of Curraghmore
Richard Power d. 1607; 4th Baron Power of Curraghmore
Baronet of Coleraine in the County of Londonderry, 1665
Tristram Beresford d. 1673; 1st Baronet	John Power d. 1661; 5th Baron Power of Curraghmore
Earl of Tyrone and Viscount Decies (2nd creation), 1673
Randal Beresford d. 1681; 2nd Baronet	Richard Power; 1630–1690; 1st Earl of Tyrone, etc., 6th Baron Power
Tristram Beresford; 1669–1701; 3rd Baronet	John Power c. 1665–1693; 2nd Earl of Tyrone, etc., 7th Baron Power	James Power; 1667–1704; 3rd Earl of Tyrone, etc., 8th Baron Power
Heir to the Barony of Tyrone outlawed, 1688 and extinct, 1704; Earldom of Tyrone (2nd creation) and Viscount Decies extinct, 1704
Viscount Tyrone and Baron Beresford (1st creation), of Beresford, in the County of Cavan, 1720; Earl of Tyrone (3rd creation), 1746	Baron La Poer retrospectively granted, 1767
Marcus Beresford; 1694–1763; 1st Earl of Tyrone, etc., 4th Baronet	Katherine Power d. 1769; Baroness La Poer
Baron Tyrone, 1786; Marquess of Waterford, 1789	Baron Decies, of Decies in the County of Waterford, 1812
George Beresford; 1735–1800; 1st Marquess of Waterford, etc., 2nd Earl of Tyrone, etc., 5th Baronet	William Beresford, 1st Baron Decies; 1743–1819; 1st Baron Decies
Beresford, later Beresford-Peirse baronets of Bagnall, 1814	Baron Beresford (2nd creation), of Albuera and Dungarvan in the County of Waterford, 1814; Viscount Beresford, of Beresford in the County of Stafford, 1823
Henry Beresford; 1772–1826; 2nd Marquess of Waterford, etc., 3rd Earl of Tyrone, etc., 6th Baronet	John Poo Beresford; 1766–1844; 1st Baronet of Bagnall	William Carr Beresford; 1768–1854; 1st Viscount Beresford, etc.	Louisa Beresford d. 1851	John Horsley-Beresford; 1774–1865; 2nd Baron Decies
Viscountcy Beresford and Barony Beresford of Albuera and Dungarvan extinct, 1844
Henry Beresford; 1811–1859; 3rd Marquess of Waterford, etc., 4th Earl of Tyrone, etc., 7th Baronet	John Beresford; 1814–1866; 4th Marquess of Waterford, etc., 5th Earl of Tyrone, etc., 8th Baronet	George de la Poer Beresford; 1811–1873; 2nd Baronet of Bagnall	William Robert John Horsley Beresford; 1811–1893; 3rd Baron Decies
Baron Beresford (3rd creation) of Metemmeh and Curraghmore in the County of Waterford, 1916
John Henry Beresford; 1844–1895; 5th Marquess of Waterford, etc., 6th Earl of Tyrone, etc., 9th Baronet	Charles William de la Poer Beresford; 1846–1919; Baron Beresford of Metemmeh and Curraghmore	Henry Monson de la Poer Beresford-Peirse; 1850–1926; 3rd Baronet of Bagnall	William Marcus de la Poer Horsley Beresford; 1865–1910; 4th Baron Decies	John Graham Hope Horsley de la Poer Beresford; 1866–1944; 5th Baron Decies
Barony Beresford (3rd creation) extinct, 1919
Henry Beresford; 1875–1911; 6th Marquess of Waterford, etc., 7th Earl of Tyrone, etc., 10th Baronet	Henry Bernard de la Poer Beresford-Peirse; 1875–1949; 4th Baronet of Bagnall
John Charles Beresford; 1901–1934; 7th Marquess of Waterford, etc., 8th Earl of Tyrone, etc., 11th Baronet	Henry Campbell de la Poer Beresford-Peirse; 1905–1972; 5th Baronet of Bagnall	Arthur George Marcus Douglas de la Poer Beresford; 1915–1992; 6th Baron Decies
John Hubert Beresford; 1933–2015; 8th Marquess of Waterford, etc., 9th Earl of Tyrone, etc., 12th Baronet	Henry Grant de la Poer Beresford-Peirse; 1933–2013; 6th Baronet of Bagnall	Marcus Hugh Tristram de la Poer Beresford b. 1948; 7th Baron Decies
Henry Nicholas Beresford b. 1958; 9th Marquess of Waterford, etc., 10th Earl of Tyrone, etc., 13th Baronet	Henry Njers de la Poer Beresford-Peirse b. 1969; 7th Baronet of Bagnall
Richard John Beresford b. 1987 styled Earl of Tyrone	Harry Tamlyn de la Poer Beresford-Peirse b. 2007	Robert Marcus Duncan de la Poer Beresford b. 1988
Heir apparent to the Marquessate of Waterford	Heir apparent to the Barony Decies	Heir apparent to the Barony Decies

== See also ==
- Count of Tyrone
- Combe Martin A Devon village with a traditional festival entitled "The Hunting of the Earl of Rone" (i.e. Tyrone)
