= Henry Beresford =

Henry Beresford may refer to:

- Henry Beresford, 2nd Marquess of Waterford (1772–1826), Anglo-Irish peer
- Henry Beresford, 3rd Marquess of Waterford (1811–1859), Anglo-Irish peer, son of the above
- Henry Beresford, 6th Marquess of Waterford (1875–1911), Anglo-Irish peer, great-grandson of the 2nd Marquess
- Henry Beresford, 9th Marquess of Waterford (born 1958), Anglo-Irish peer, great-grandson of the above
