= Lord William Beresford =

Recipient of the Victoria Cross

Lord William Beresford VC KCIE
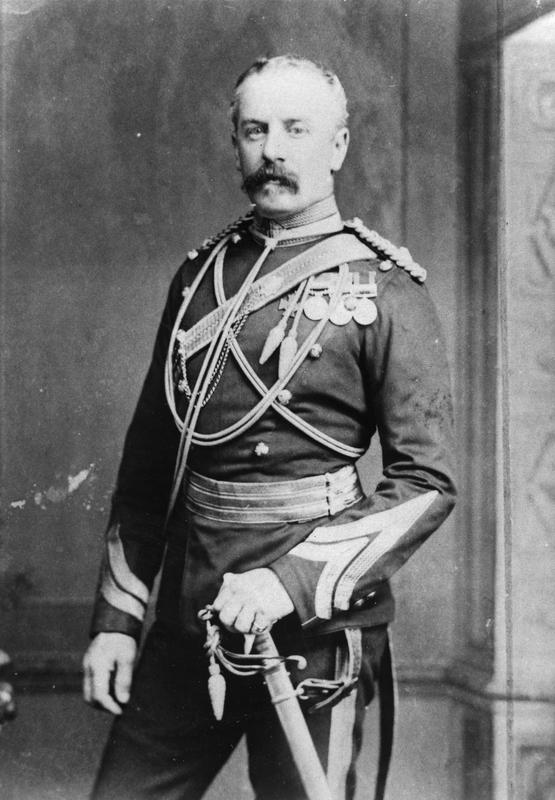
- Lord William Beresford, c. 1880
- Born: 20 July 1847; Mullaghbrack, County Armagh
- Died: 30 December 1900 (aged 53); Dorking, Surrey
- Burial place: Clonagem Churchyard, County Waterford
- Spouse: Lily Spencer-Churchill, Duchess of Marlborough (m. 1895)
- Military career
- Allegiance: United Kingdom
- Branch: British Army
- Rank: Lieutenant-Colonel
- Unit: 9th Queen's Royal Lancers
- Conflicts: Anglo-Zulu War
- Awards: Victoria Cross; Knight Commander of the Order of the Indian Empire

Lieutenant-Colonel Lord William Leslie de la Poer Beresford VC KCIE (20 July 1847 – 30 December 1900) was an Anglo-Irish soldier and recipient of the Victoria Cross, the highest and most prestigious award for gallantry in the face of the enemy that can be awarded to British and Commonwealth forces.

== Early life ==
Beresford was born on 20 July 1847. He was the third son of the Church of Ireland minister John Beresford, 4th Marquess of Waterford and his wife, the former Christiana Leslie. His eldest brother, John Beresford, became the 5th Marquess of Waterford and his second brother, Admiral Charles Beresford, became the 1st Baron Beresford. His younger brother, Lord Marcus Beresford, was a prominent equerry and racing manager.

His maternal grandfather was Charles Powell Leslie II, an Irish member of the UK Parliament for County Monaghan and New Ross, and his paternal grandfather was Henry Beresford, 2nd Marquess of Waterford.

Beresford was sent to Eton College in 1858. When he was 16, he left Eton for Bonn, where he studied French and German at the home of a tutor.

== Career ==
In 1867, at the age of 20, he joined the 9th Queen's Royal Lancers as a cornet. In 1875, the regiment was sent to India, where it was stationed at Sialkot. Later that year he was appointed aide-de-camp to Lord Northbrook, the retiring Viceroy, in Calcutta. He did some racing, and won the Corinthian Purse at a meet attended by the Prince of Wales.

=== Zulu war ===
Beresford became a captain in the 9th Lancers during the Zulu War of 1879. On 3 July 1879 at Ulundi, Zululand, South Africa, during the retirement of a reconnoitring party, Captain Lord William Beresford went to the assistance of Sergeant Fitzmaurice of the 24th Regiment, whose horse had fallen and rolled on him. The Zulus were coming in great numbers, but Lord William, with help from Sergeant Edmund O'Toole of the Frontier Light Horse, managed to mount the injured man behind him. He was, however, so dizzy that Sergeant O'Toole, who had been keeping back the advancing Zulus, gave up his carbine and, riding alongside, helped to hold him on until they reached safety.

Initially the VC was only awarded to Beresford but he told the Queen that O'Toole also deserved the honour:

Her Majesty pinning it on to the hero's breast, but not before he had explained to his Queen he could not in honour receive recognition of any services he had been able to perform, unless Sergeant O'Toole's services were also recognised, as he deserved infinitely greater credit than any that might attach to himself. The Queen, appreciating this generosity and soldierly honesty, bestowed the reward also on Sergeant Edmund OToole of Baker's Horse, and Lord William was satisfied.

=== Later career ===
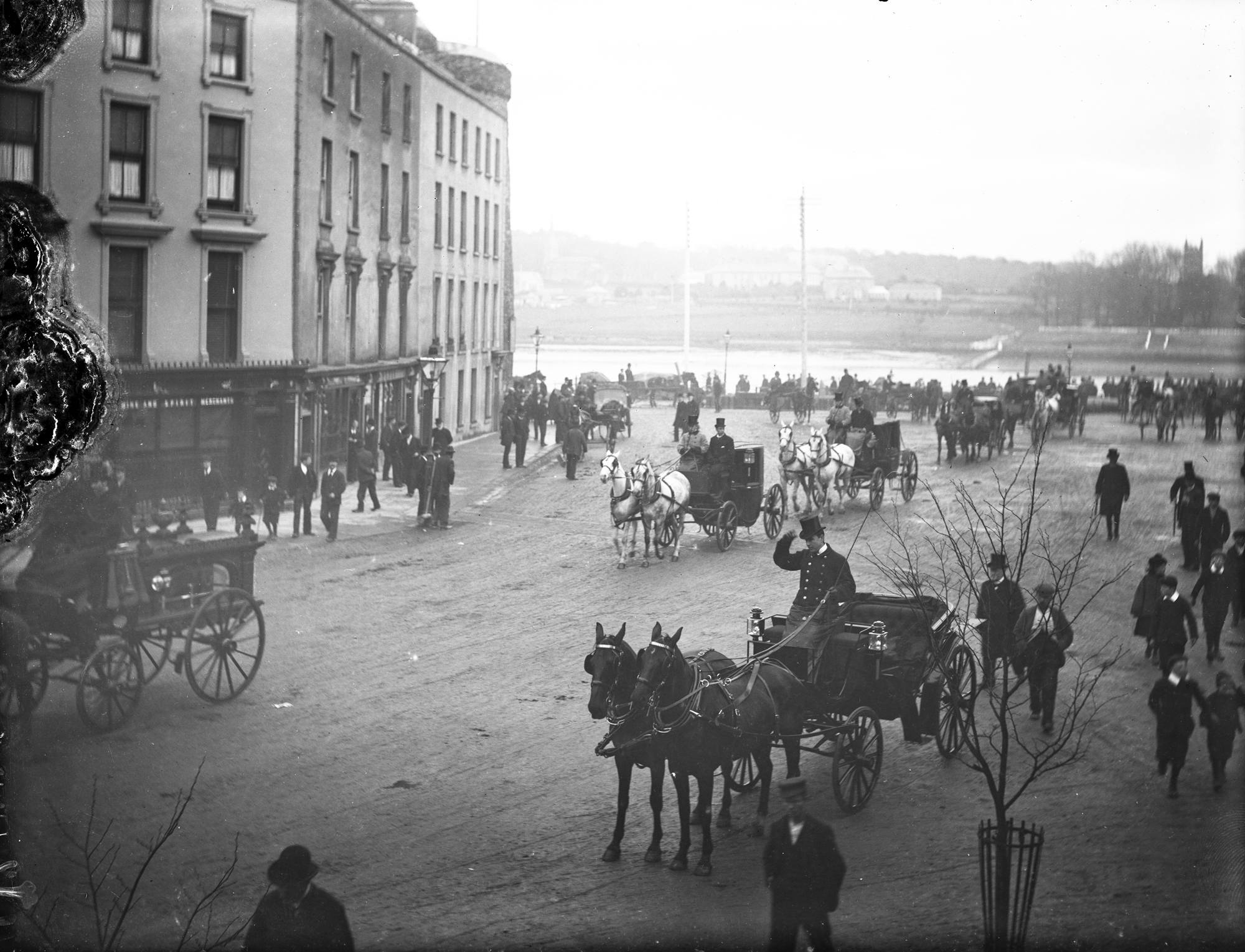
Lord William Beresford's funeral, 3 January 1901

Lord William Beresford became a member of the staff of the Viceroy of India. He won the Viceroy's cup at the Calcutta Turf Club in 1881 with his black gelding Camballo. He later won it three more times with Myall King. Beresford strongly believed in the merits of English thoroughbreds. He was rivalled in Indian racing circles by the wealthy Calcutta merchant Apcar Alexander Apcar, who owned a stud of Australian race horses, and his partner the barrister Malcolm Peter Gasper. This competition did much to improve the quality of horses in India. In England, Beresford's filly Sibola won the 1899 1,000 Guineas Stakes, and came second in The Oaks. In 1899 his two-year-old Democrat beat Diamond Jubilee, winner of the Triple Crown. Democrat did not continue racing, but later was Lord Kitchener's charger in India.

Lord William Beresford achieved the rank of lieutenant colonel.

== Personal life ==
In 1895, he married American heiress and socialite Lillian, Duchess of Marlborough, widow of George Spencer-Churchill, 8th Duke of Marlborough, and daughter of Commodore Cicero Price. Together, Lily and William were the parents of one child:

- William Warren de la Poer Beresford (1897–1919).

He died at Deepdene, Dorking, Surrey on 30 December 1900 from peritonitis at the age of 53.

== Bibliography ==
Listed in order of year of publication

- The Register of the Victoria Cross (1981, 1988 and 1997)
- Clarke, Brian D. H. (1986). "A register of awards to Irish-born officers and men". The Irish Sword. XVI (64): 185–287.
- Ireland's VCs (Dept of Economic Development, 1995)
- Monuments to Courage (David Harvey, 1999)
- Irish Winners of the Victoria Cross (Richard Doherty & David Truesdale, 2000)
