= Charles Ridley =

Charles Ridley may refer to:

- Charles A. Ridley, director of the 1942 British short propaganda film Schichlegruber Doing the Lambeth Walk
- Charles William Ridley (1812–1867), British soldier
- Curt Ridley (Charles Curtis Ridley, 1951–2021), Canadian ice hockey goaltender
