= Lord Marcus Beresford =

British racing manager (1848–1922)

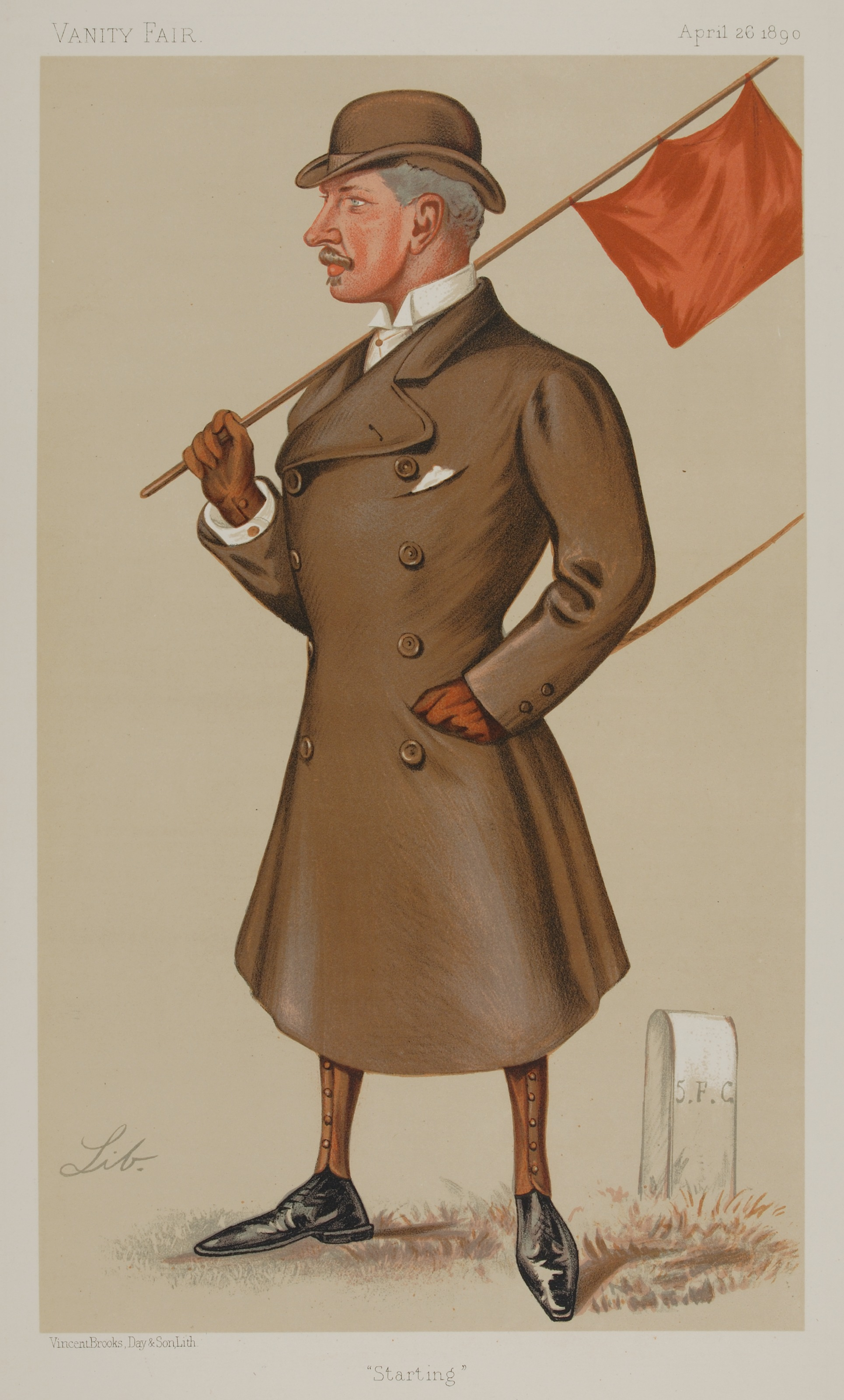
"Starting" Beresford as depicted by Liborio Prosperi in Vanity Fair. 1890

Lord Marcus Talbot de la Poer Beresford (25 December 1848 – 16 December 1922) was an equerry and racing manager.

The son of the 4th Marquess of Waterford, he ran the stables of Albert Edward, Prince of Wales from 1890. On the Prince's accession as King Edward VII in 1901, Beresford was appointed an Extra Equerry and Manager of His Majesty's Thoroughbred Stud, serving until the King's death in 1910. The new King George V similarly appointed him in charge of his stables from 1910 until his own death in 1922.

On 28 August 1895, Beresford married Louisa Catherine Ridley, daughter of Major-General Charles William Ridley.

== Sources ==
- Burke's Peerage & Gentry, 107th edition
