= Charles William Ridley =

British Army general

Major-General Charles William Ridley CB
- Born: 1812
- Died: 1 February, 1867 (aged 54–55)
- Allegiance: United Kingdom
- Branch: British Army
- Rank: Major-General
- Commands: Grenadier Guards: 1st Division; 53rd Regiment of Foot
- Battles / wars: Crimean War; Siege of Sevastopol

Major-General Charles William Ridley CB (1812 – 1 February 1867) was a British soldier.

== Biography ==
He was the second son of Sir Matthew White Ridley, 3rd Baronet (who died in 1836), by Laura, youngest daughter of George Hawkins, esq. He was born in 1812, and educated at Westminster School.

He entered the army as ensign and second lieutenant in the Grenadier Guards in February 1828, and became major-general in 1859. On the army embarking for active service in the East, he accompanied his regiment to Turkey. He commanded the Grenadier Guards, and afterwards a brigade in the 1st Division at the siege and fall of Sebastopol from 1 December 1854.

In recognition of his military services while serving with the Eastern army, he was nominated a Companion of the Order of the Bath; he was also made an officer of the Legion of Honour, received both the Sardinian and Turkish medals, and the 3rd class of the Order of the Medjidie. In April 1865, he was made colonel of the 53rd Regiment of Foot.

In 1845, he married Henrietta Araminta Monck Browne, daughter of Dominick Browne, 1st Baron Oranmore and Browne; they lived at Fir Grove, Eversley, Hampshire.

His daughter, Louisa Catherine Ridley, married Captain Henry Bloomfield Kingscote (b. 28 Feb 1843, d. 1 Aug 1915), English cricketer, on 31 March 1870.
