= Viscount Decies =

Viscount Decies is a title that has been created twice in the Peerage of Ireland. The first creation came on 31 January 1569 in favour Maurice Fitzgerald, Baron of Dromana. He had already been created Baron of Dromana on 27 January 1569, also in the Peerage of Ireland. This creation became extinct on his death in 1572. The second creation came on 9 October 1673 in favour of Richard Power, 6th Baron Power. See Earl of Tyrone for more information on this creation.

== Viscount Decies (1569) ==
- Maurice Fitzgerald, 1st Viscount Decies (died 1572)

== Viscounts Decies (1673) ==
- see Earl of Tyrone (1673 creation)

== See also ==
- Baron Decies
