= Marcus Beresford, 1st Earl of Tyrone =

Irish peer and politician

The Right Honourable The Earl of Tyrone
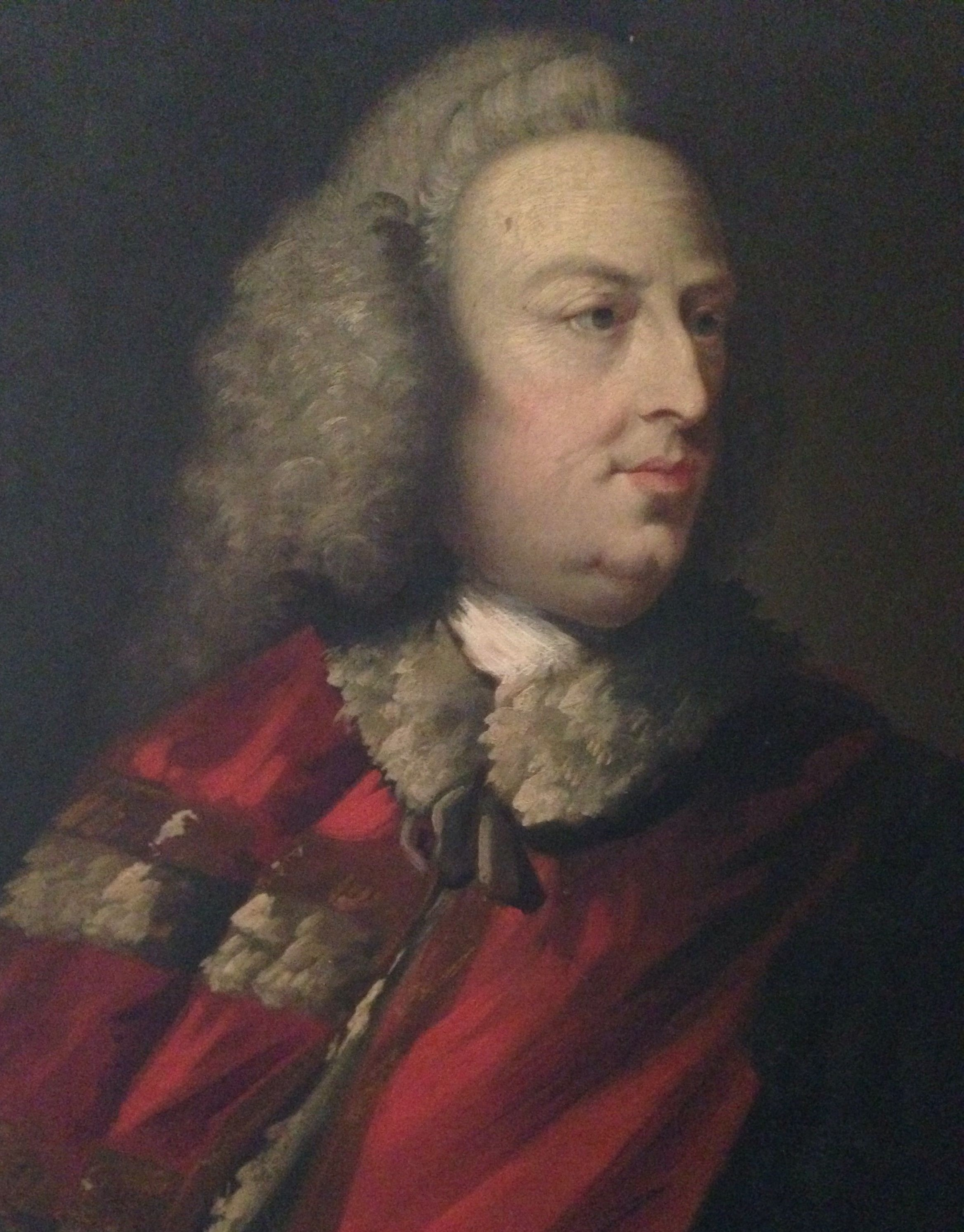
- Portrait by John Astley

Member of Parliament for Coleraine
- In office 1715–1720
- Preceded by: Frederick Hamilton
- Succeeded by: Francis Burton

Personal details
- Born: Marcus Beresford; 16 July 1694
- Died: 4 April 1763 (aged 68)
- Spouse: Lady Catherine Power (after 1717)
- Children: 15
- Parent(s): Sir Tristram Beresford, 3rd Baronet; Nichola Sophia Hamilton

Marcus Beresford, 1st Earl of Tyrone (16 July 1694 – 4 April 1763), known as Sir Marcus Beresford, 4th Baronet, until 1720 and subsequently as The Viscount Tyrone until 1746, was an Anglo-Irish peer and politician.

== Early life ==
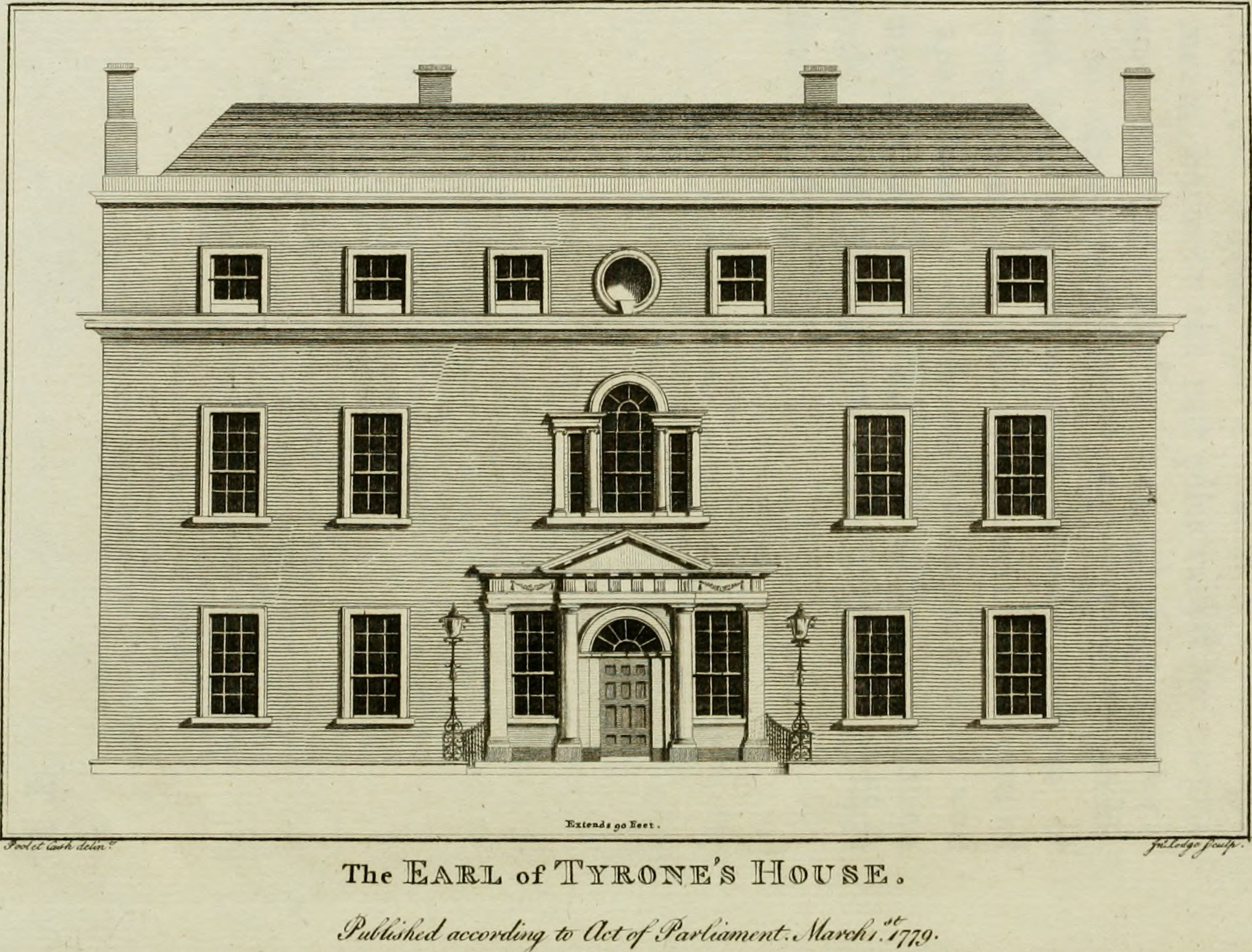
Tyrone House, Dublin designed by Richard Cassels for Beresford as his city townhouse in 1740.

He was the only son of Sir Tristram Beresford, 3rd Baronet, and his wife Nichola Sophia Hamilton, youngest daughter of Hugh Hamilton, 1st Viscount of Glenawly and his second wife Susanna Balfour.

In 1701 his father died and Beresford, aged only five, succeeded to the baronetcy. His guardian was The 3rd Viscount Dungannon (1669-1706). After Lord Dungannon's death in 1706, his widow (Beresford's maternal aunt), Arabella, Viscountess Dungannon, served as Beresford's guardian.

== Career ==
In 1715, he entered the Irish House of Commons, sitting for Coleraine until 1720, when he was raised to the Peerage of Ireland with the titles Baron Beresford, of Beresford, in the County of Cavan, and Viscount Tyrone by King George I of Great Britain. A year later, he joined the Irish House of Lords. In 1736, he became Grandmaster of the Grand Lodge of Ireland, serving for the next two years. Beresford was further honoured in 1746, when he was created Earl of Tyrone.

== Personal life ==
On 18 July 1717, he married Lady Catherine Power, only daughter of James Power, 3rd Earl of Tyrone (who was also the 8th Baron Power) and the former Anne Rickard (eldest daughter and co-heiress of Andrew Rickard, of Dangan-Spidoge). Together, they were the parents of seven sons and eight daughters, including:

- Hon. James Beresford, who died young.
- Hon. Marcus Beresford (b. 1727), who died young.
- Hon. Marcus Beresford (b. 1733), who died young.
- George Beresford, 1st Marquess of Waterford (1735–1800), who married Elizabeth Monck, only daughter and heiress of Henry Monck and Lady Isabella Bentinck (second daughter of Henry Bentinck, 1st Duke of Portland), in 1769.
- John Beresford (c. 1737–1805), an MP who married Countess Anne Constantin de Ligondes, a daughter of Gen. Count de Ligondes, in 1760. After her death in 1770, he married Barbara Montgomery, second daughter of Sir William Montgomery, 1st Baronet, in 1777.
- William Beresford, 1st Baron Decies (1743–1819), who married Elizabeth FitzGibbon, sister of John FitzGibbon, 1st Earl of Clare, and daughter of John FitzGibbon, of Mount Shannon, in 1763.
- Lady Catherine Beresford (d. 1763), who married Thomas Christmas MP, of Whitefield in 1748. After his death in 1749), she married Theophilus Jones, MP, of Headfort, in 1754.
- Lady Anne Beresford (d. 1770), who married William Annesley, 1st Viscount Glerawly, in 1738.
- Lady Jane Beresford (d. 1792), who married Edward Cary MP, of Dungiven, in 1743.
- Lady Araminta Beresford (d. 1818), who married George Paul Monck, MP, in 1755.
- Lady Frances Maria Beresford (d. 1815), who married Henry Flood, MP, of Farmley, in 1762.
- Lady Eliza Beresford, who married Col. Thomas Cobbe, MP, of Newbridge, son of Most Rev Charles Cobbe, Archbishop of Dublin.

Lord Beresford died at Tyrone House in Dublin and was succeeded in his titles by his fourth and oldest surviving son George. In 1767, four years after the earl's death, his widow claimed the title Baron La Poer and was shortly thereafter confirmed. She died in 1769.

Parliament of Ireland
Preceded by Frederick Hamilton; George Lowther	Member of Parliament for Coleraine; 1715–1720; With: Frederick Hamilton	Succeeded by Frederick Hamilton; Francis Burton
Masonic offices
Preceded by The Lord Kingston	Grandmaster of the Grand Lodge of Ireland; 1736–1738	Succeeded by The Viscount Mountjoy
Peerage of Ireland
New creation	Earl of Tyrone; 1746–1763	Succeeded by George Beresford
New creation	Viscount Tyrone; 1720–1763	Succeeded by George Beresford
Baronetage of Ireland
Preceded by Tristram Beresford	Baronet (of Coleraine); 1701–1763	Succeeded by George Beresford
