= James Power, 3rd Earl of Tyrone =

Irish Jacobite nobleman

James Power, 3rd Earl of Tyrone (1667 – 19 August 1704) was an Irish Jacobite nobleman.

== Early life ==
He was the youngest son of Richard Power, 1st Earl of Tyrone and the former Lady Dorothy Annesley. Among his siblings were elder brother John Power, 2nd Earl of Tyrone (who married Katharine FitzGerald, only child and heiress of Sir John FitzGerald of Dromana) and his sister, Lady Helena Power (who married John Walsh, of Pilltown).

His paternal grandparents were John Power, 5th Baron Power, and the former Ruth Pyphoe. His maternal grandparents were Arthur Annesley, 1st Earl of Anglesey, and Elizabeth Altham (eldest daughter of Sir James Altham).

== Career ==
Although a Protestant, he was a Capt. in his father's Regiment of Foot and at the surrender of Waterford in 1690, he submitted to King William III and was given a pardon under the Great Seal in 1697. From 1691 until his death in 1704, he was Governor of the city and county of Waterford.

He succeeded to the earldom of Tyrone upon the death of his brother in 1693.

== Personal life ==
On 13 December 1692, Power married Anne Rickard (d. 1729), the eldest daughter and heiress of Andrew Rickard, of Dangan-Spidoge, and the former Anne Hooke (daughter and heiress of Rev. Thomas Hooke). Before his death in 1704, they were the parents of:

- Lady Catherine Power, who married Marcus Beresford, only son of Sir Tristram Beresford, 3rd Baronet, and Hon. Nichola Sophia Hamilton (youngest daughter of Hugh Hamilton, 1st Viscount of Glenawly), in 1717. Marcus was created the Earl of Tyrone by George I in 1746.

Lord Tyrone died on 19 August 1704 at which point the earldom became extinct. Lady Tyrone died on 26 September 1729 and was buried in the Protestant Church at Carrick-on-Suir. On 19 December 1767, the barony of La Poer was confirmed on his daughter and her heirs by a decision of the Irish House of Lords despite the barony never having been a barony in fee.

Peerage of Ireland
| Preceded by John Power | Earl of Tyrone; 1693–1704 | Extinct |
