= John Beresford, 4th Marquess of Waterford =

Irish peer and Church of Ireland minister

Reverend John de la Poer Beresford, 4th Marquess of Waterford (27 April 1814 – 6 November 1866) was an Irish peer and Church of Ireland minister.

Beresford was the third son of the Henry Beresford, 2nd Marquess of Waterford and his wife, Susanna. He was educated at Eton and Trinity College, Cambridge. He later entered the ministry and was the incumbent of Mullaghbrack, County Armagh and a Prebendary of St Patrick's Cathedral, serving under his uncle, Lord John Beresford.

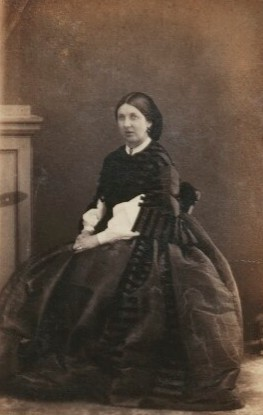
Christiana Beresford, Marchioness of Waterford

On 20 February 1843, he married Christiana Prudence Elizabeth Powell Leslie, daughter of Colonel Charles Powell Leslie, of Castle Leslie, Glaslough, County Monaghan. They had five sons:

- John Henry de la Poer Beresford, 5th Marquess of Waterford (1844–1895)
- Lord Charles William de la Poer Beresford (1846–1919), later created Baron Beresford, naval commander
- Lord William Leslie de la Poer Beresford, VC (1847–1900), soldier
- Lord Marcus Talbot de la Poer Beresford (1848–1922), equerry
- Lord Delaval James de la Poer Beresford (1862–1906), soldier

== Death ==
Beresford inherited the marquessate from his childless brother, Henry in 1859. On his own death in 1866, the title passed to his eldest son, John.

Peerage of Ireland
Preceded by Henry Beresford	Marquess of Waterford; 1859–1866	Succeeded by John Beresford
