= Richard Power, 1st Baron le Power and Coroghmore =

Irish baron (died 1539)

Richard Power
- Baron Power
- Tenure: 1535–1539
- Successor: Piers Power, 2nd Baron le Power and Curraghmore
- Died: 10 November 1539
- Spouse: Catherine Butler
- Issue Detail: Piers, John, & others
- Father: Piers Power
- Mother: A daughter of Gerald FitzGerald of the Decies

Richard Power, 1st Baron Power of Curraghmore (died 1539)

Family tree

Richard Power with wife, parents, and other selected relatives. (Note: This family tree is based on genealogies of the Poer family* and those of the earls of Ormond.)

Richard; Power d. 1483	Gerald; FitzGerald of Decies	James; Butler d. 1487 of Polestown	Sabh; Kavanagh
Piers; Power	unknown FitzGerald	Piers; 8th Earl; 1467–1539	Margaret; FitzGerald c. 1473 – 1542
Richard; Power; 1st Baron d. 1538}	Catherine; Butler	James; 13th Earl of Desmond d. 1558
Piers; 2nd Baron; 1522–1544	John; 3rd Baron c. 1530 – 1592	Eleanor; FitzGerald
Richard; 4th Baron c. 1607	Katharine de Barry

Legend

XXX	Subject of the article	XXX	Barons; Power	XXX	Earls of Ormond	XXX	Earls of Desmond

== Birth and origins ==
Richard was the eldest son of Piers Power and his first wife. His family name is also given as Poer. His father was "lord" of Curraghmore, County Waterford. His father's family is Old English.

His mother, whose first name is unknown, was a daughter of Gerald FitzGerald of Decies (/ˈdeɪʃə/), the second son of James FitzGerald, 6th Earl of Desmond, also numbered as the 7th earl, called the "usurper". This second son had been given Decies (see the modern baronies of Decies-within-Drum and Decies-without-Drum) as appanage and thus became the first lord of Decies.

He had three brothers: Piers Power of Brenane, Nicholas Power of Corduff, and William Power, Knight of St. John of Jerusalem; as well as a sister: Ellen, who married Walter Power of Donoyle.

== Marriage and children ==
Power married Catherine, second daughter of Piers Butler, 8th Earl of Ormond.

Richard and Catherine had three sons:

1. Piers (1522–1544), who succeeded as the 2nd baron but died unmarried – for the 2nd Baron
2. John (1529/30 – 1592), who succeeded as the 3rd baron and married Eleanor, 3rd daughter of James FitzGerald, 13th Earl of Desmond.
3. Thomas of Coolfin

–and two daughters:

1. Katherine, married Sir Nicholas Devereux of Ballymagir
2. Elice, married Thomas FitzGerald, father of James fitz Thomas FitzGerald, the Sugan Earl.

== Baron ==
Power was created Baron "Le Power and Coroghmore" by a patent dated 13 September 1535.

== Death ==
Power was killed on 10 November 1538 by Connor O'Callaghan during an Irish rebellion.

== Notes and references ==
=== Sources ===
- Burke, Bernard (1866). A Genealogical History of the Dormant, Abeyant, Forfeited and Extinct Peerages of the British Empire (New ed.). London: Harrison. OCLC 11501348.
- Burke, Sir Bernard (1879). A Genealogical and Heraldic History of the Landed Gentry of Great Britain and Ireland. Vol. II (6th ed.). London: Harrison. OCLC 972909415. – L to Z
- Burke, Bernard; Burke, Ashworth Peter (1915). A Genealogical and Heraldic History of the Peerage and Baronetage, the Privy Council, Knightage and Companionage (77th ed.). London: Harrison. OCLC 1155471554.
- Cokayne, George Edward (1895). Complete Peerage of England, Scotland, Ireland, Great Britain and the United Kingdom, Extant, Extinct, or Dormant. Vol. VI (1st ed.). London: George Bell and Sons. OCLC 1180818801. – N to R
- Cokayne, George Edward (1945). Doubleday, H. A. (ed.). The complete peerage or a History of the House of Lords and all its Members from the Earliest Times. Vol. X (2nd ed.). London: The St Catherine Press. OCLC 228661424. – Oakham to Richmond (snippet view)
- Redmond, Gabriel O'C. (1891a). "The Family of Poher, Poer, or Power (continued from page 97) Part II". The Irish Builder. XXXIII: 116–117.
- Redmond, Gabriel O'C. (1891b). "The Family of Poher, Poer, or Power (continued from page 117)". The Irish Builder. XXXIII: 126–128.
- Redmond, Gabriel O'C. (1891c). "The Family of Poher, Poer, or Power, Part IV". The Irish Builder. XXXIII: 150–151.

Peerage of Ireland
New creation	Baron Le Power and Curraghmore; 1535–1539	Succeeded by Piers Power
