= Sir George de la Poer Beresford, 2nd Baronet =

Sir George Beresford Bt

Member of Parliament for Athlone
- In office 8 July 1841 – 10 June 1842
- Preceded by: John O'Connell
- Succeeded by: Daniel Farrell

Personal details
- Born: 1 March 1811
- Died: 11 February 1873 (aged 61)
- Party: Conservative

Sir George de la Poer Beresford, 2nd Baronet (1 March 1811 – 11 February 1873) was an Irish Conservative politician, peer, and army officer. Son of Sir John Beresford, 1st Baronet and Mary née Molly. In 1846 he married Elizabeth Lucas, daughter of Davis Lucas. He had at least four children, including: Mary Beresford (died 1847); Marcia Mary Ann Harriet Wilhelmina de la Poer Beresford (died 1908); John Edward Francis de la Poer Beresford (1851–1854); and William Carr de la Poer Beresford (1858–188).

He was elected Conservative MP for Athlone at the 1841 general election but was unseated just under a year later. At the ensuing by-election, he stood again but was unsuccessful.

He succeeded to the Baronetcy of Bagnall in 1844 upon the death of his father. Upon his own death in 1873, the title was inherited by Henry Monson de la Poer Beresford-Peirse.

He was also a member of the Travellers Club and White's.

Parliament of the United Kingdom
Preceded by John O'Connell	Member of Parliament for Athlone; 1841–1842	Succeeded by Daniel Farrell
Baronetage of the United Kingdom
Preceded by John Beresford	Baronet (of Bagnall); 1844 – 1873	Succeeded by Henry Monson de la Poer Beresford-Peirse
