= Richard Power, 1st Earl of Tyrone =

Richard Power, 1st Earl of Tyrone (1630–1690) was an Irish Jacobite nobleman.

== Early life ==
Power was the eldest son of John Power, 5th Baron Power, of Curraghmore, County Waterford, who died in 1661, by his wife Ruth Pyphoe. About the time of his birth, his father became insane; his mother died when he was about twelve years old, and his grandmother Mrs. Pyphoe obtained protection for her daughter's children on the ground of their father's lunacy, and lack of involvement in the Irish Rebellion of 1641. When Oliver Cromwell came to Ireland he issued an order on 20 September 1649 to the effect that Lord Power and his family were under his protection. The Powers were pardoned in the Cromwellian Act of Settlement, but they were impoverished by the war, and in the spring of 1654 they received a weekly grant. They were threatened with transplantation to Connaught in that year, but were respited after inquiry; and Colonel Richard Lawrence spoke up for them. The family were classed as recusants, but there was no forfeiture.

In 1655 Richard Power's sister Catherine (died 1660) was appointed his guardian. About three years later she married John Fitzgerald of Dromana, and asked that another guardian might be appointed. Power was Member of Parliament for County Waterford in the Parliament of Ireland of 1660. He succeeded to the peerage on the death of his father next year, and his kinsman James, Lord Annesley, was elected to fill his seat.

== Baron Power ==
The new Lord Power was made governor of the county and city of Waterford, and had also a company of foot; but the pay was often in arrear. In June 1666 it was falsely reported that Edmund Ludlow was going to attack Limerick at the head of a French army. Ormonde took precautions, and Orrery, as lord president of Munster, ordered Lord Power to have his militia in readiness.

In 1669 Power had a grant of forfeited lands which belonged to various persons of the name of Power. He purchased other forfeited property at Dungarvan. In May 1673 Power made a move to unite the Curraghmore and Dromana estates by marrying his ward and sister's daughter, Catherine Fitzgerald, to his eldest surviving son John. Catherine was about twelve years old, and her cousin about seven, but Archbishop Gilbert Sheldon allowed a marriage ceremony to be performed before him in Lambeth Chapel.

== Earl of Tyrone ==
In October 1673 Lord Power was created Earl of Tyrone and Viscount Decies (a title formerly borne by the Fitzgeralds), in the Peerage of Ireland. In May 1675 Catherine appeared again before Archbishop Sheldon and repudiated the marriage contract. Tyrone left Ireland suddenly without the Lord Lieutenant's license, which he was obliged to have. Catherine Fitzgerald continued to live for a time under the charge of Tyrone's father-in-law, Lord Anglesey, but on Easter eve 1677 she left his house, and was married the same day to Edward Villiers, eldest son of George Villiers, 4th Viscount Grandison. Chancery proceedings followed, and Tyrone was forced to give up the title deeds of the Dromana estate.

In March 1678 – 1679 information was laid before the Lord Lieutenant and council by an attorney, Herbert Bourke, saying that Tyrone was implicated in treason; Bourke had been on friendly terms with Tyrone, but they had subsequently quarrelled, and Tyrone had sent him to prison for an assault. Bourke was acquitted and said that the charge was trumped up. Bourke's charges against Tyrone formed part of an alleged "Irish plot" corresponding to the fabricated "Popish Plot" in England. After enquiry, they were remitted to the King's Bench. Tyrone had to find bail, and was excluded from Dublin Castle and the council board until the case could be heard. He was indicted for a treasonable conspiracy at the Waterford assizes in August 1679, and again in March 1680, Chief Justice John Keating presiding on both occasions. Both grand juries ignored the bills.

Tyrone, who had not been discharged from bail, was then brought to England before the end of 1680; his impeachment was decided on by the House of Commons of England, and he was locked up in the Gatehouse Prison. Evidence was given by Thomas Sampson, Tyrone's former steward. On 3 January 1681 the Earl petitioned the House of Lords. Parliament was dissolved two weeks later, the "plot" was discredited, and peers gave bail at the beginning of 1684 for Tyrone's appearance at the opening of the next session of parliament.

== Under James II ==
Tyrone was allowed to return to Ireland. After the accession of James II in 1685, he became a colonel of a regiment of foot, was made a privy councillor in May 1686, and in 1687 received a pension. He was lord lieutenant of the county and city of Waterford. He was one of the twenty-four aldermen elected for the city when James suppressed the old corporation and granted a new charter.

== Last years ==
Tyrone sat as a peer in the Patriot Parliament held on 7 May 1689, where the business included the attainder of most of the Protestant landowners. His regiment was one of seven which formed the garrison of Cork when John Churchill attacked it in September 1690. He and Colonel Rycault negotiated the capitulation, and the garrison became prisoners on 28 September.

Tyrone was charged with treason, and sent to the Tower of London by order of the privy council dated 9 October. There he died on the 14th, and on 3 November he was buried in the parish church of Farnborough, Hampshire, the resting-place of his father-in-law Anglesey. He underwent outlawry in Ireland, but this was reversed in his son's time.

== Family ==
Tyrone married in 1654 Dorothy Annesley, eldest daughter of Arthur Annesley, 1st Earl of Anglesey He was succeeded by his eldest surviving son, John, who died a bachelor in 1693 at the age of 28, and had gone through the formal marriage when he was seven. He was succeeded as third Earl by his brother James, who left one daughter, Lady Catherine. She became the wife of Sir Marcus Beresford.

== Notes ==
Attribution

This article incorporates text from a publication now in the public domain: Lee, Sidney, ed. (1896). "Power, Richard". Dictionary of National Biography. Vol. 46. London: Smith, Elder & Co.

Peerage of Ireland
New creation	Earl of Tyrone; 1673–1690	Succeeded by John Power
Preceded by John Power	Baron Power; 1661–1690	Succeeded by John Power
