= Henry Beresford, 3rd Marquess of Waterford =

Irish peer known as the "Mad Marquis" (1811–1859)

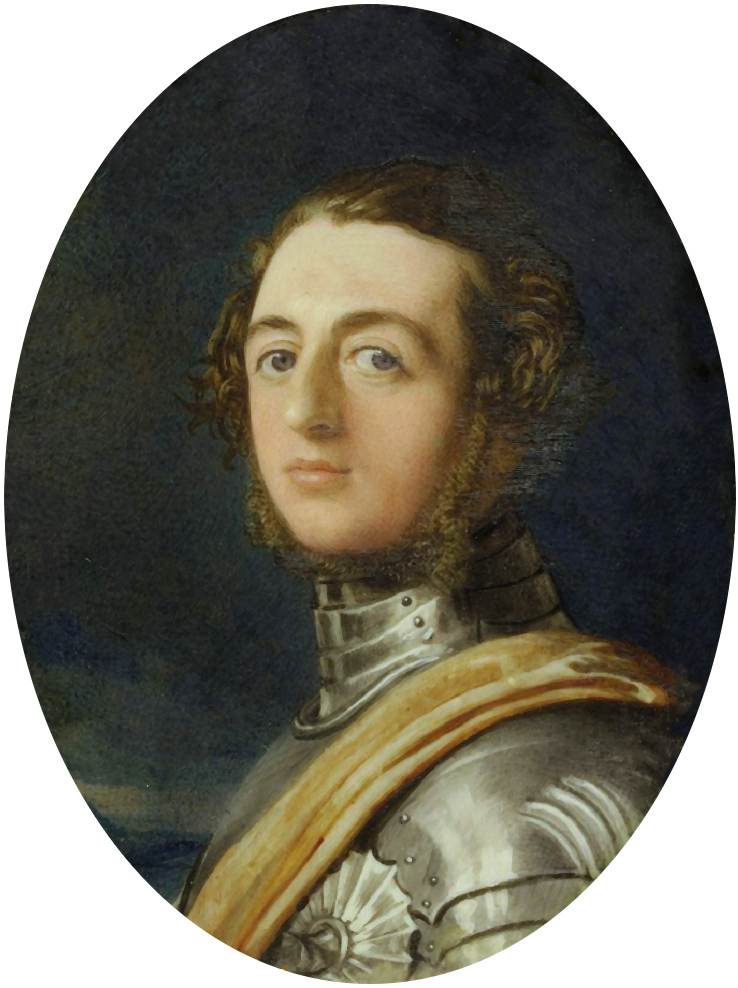
Miniature of the Marquess of Waterford dressed in Eglinton armour, by Robert Thorburn (1840)

Henry de la Poer Beresford, 3rd Marquess of Waterford, KP (26 April 1811 – 29 March 1859), styled Lord Henry Beresford before 1824 and Earl of Tyrone between 1824 and 1826, was an Irish peer. Referred to as the "Mad Marquis", he is also remembered as an eccentric.

== Background ==
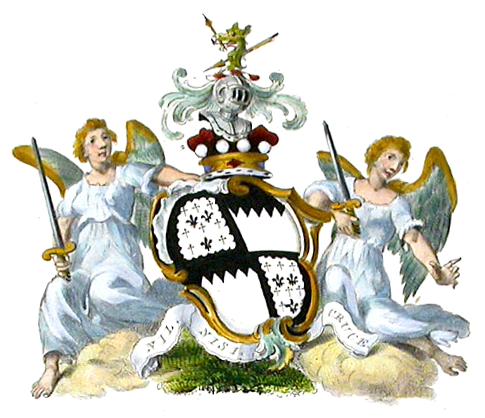
Heraldic achievement of the Marquess of Waterford

Beresford was born on 26 April 1811, the second son of Henry Beresford, 2nd Marquess of Waterford, and the former Lady Susanna Carpenter (died 1827), only daughter of the 2nd Earl of Tyrconnell and the heiress Sarah Delaval. From the latter the Beresfords inherited the Delaval estates in Northumberland, including Ford Castle. His sister, Lady Sarah, was married to the 18th Earl of Shrewsbury. Lord Henry became heir apparent to the marquessate on the death of his elder brother, George Beresford, Earl of Tyrone, in 1824. He succeeded to the marquessate on his father's death in 1826. He was educated at Eton College and Christ Church, Oxford.

Henry Waterford was perhaps the most notorious member of the harum scarum (i.e. "reckless", "impetuous") Anglo-Irish Beresford family.

== First to "paint the town red" ==
In the early hours of Thursday, 6 April 1837, Beresford and his hunting friends arrived in Melton Mowbray at the Thorpe End tollgate. They had been drinking heavily at Croxton races, and understandably the tollkeeper asked to be paid before he opened the gate for them. Sadly for him, some repairs were underway, and ladders, brushes and pots of red paint were lying nearby; the Marquess and his cronies seized these and attacked the tollkeeper, painting him and a constable who intervened red. They then nailed up the door of the tollhouse and painted that red before moving into the town carrying the stolen equipment.

They rampaged down the Beast Market (now Sherrard Street), through the Market Place, and into Burton Street, painting doors as they passed, pulling on door knockers and knocking over flower pots. At the Red Lion (now part of the Harboro Hotel), they pulled down the sign and threw it into the canal. At the Old Swan Inn in the Market Place, next to what is now the Grapes, the Marquess was hoisted onto the shoulder of another man to paint the carved swan inn sign there red. (In 1988, when the old Swan Porch fell down, traces of red paint were found on the back of the carved swan when it was removed for restoration). They also vandalised the Post Office and the Leicestershire banking company before trying to overturn a caravan in which a man was fast asleep.

Solitary policemen tried to intervene at intervals and were beaten up and painted red for their trouble. Eventually, more police arrived in numbers and seized one of the men, Edward Raynard, who was put in the Bridewell prison. The others promptly returned and rescued him, breaking three locks and beating two constables, threatening them with murder if they did not produce the key. The following day there was uproar; when the Marquess of Waterford finally sobered up, he paid for all the damage to people and property, but the group were still brought to trial before the Derby Assize Court in July 1838. According to one account, Beresford appeared before the magistrate clad in bear furs. They were found not guilty of riot, but were fined £100 each for common assault, a considerable sum then. After the incident, the phrase "paint the town red" entered the language, but there is no documented use of this phrase before 1883. The phrase is often attributed to the Melton Mowbray incident, but there is insufficient evidence to that effect.

== The Fracas of Bergen, Norway ==
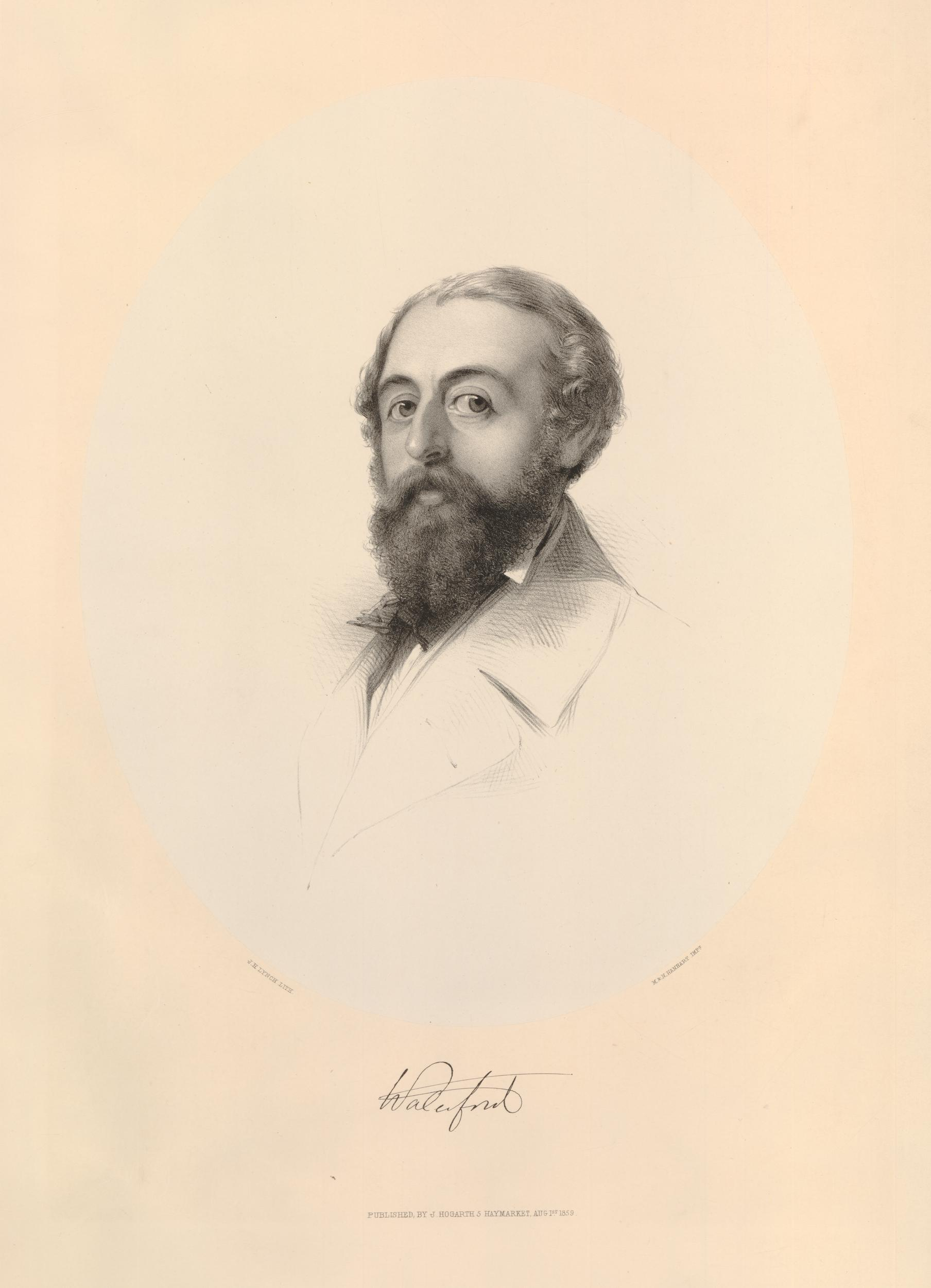
Portrait by James Henry Lynch (1859)

In the late summer of 1837, the Marquess and his entourage took a pleasure cruise on the yacht Charlotte, belonging to the Royal Yacht Squadron, to the seaport of Bergen in Norway—allegedly with the goal to reach The North Pole. According to the contemporary report in The Times, the Marquess became, together with a local girl, involved in a disorder and he was given a blow on the head by the "morning star" of a local watchman. The Marquess' life was in danger, but he recovered after a period at the local hospital and his conduct was tried in court. It was reported that "The Marquis of Waterford is fully recovered, he was tried at Bergen and sentence passed, he was absolved from the accusation and the watchman from all further prosecution, the latter is to pay the costs"— following the intervention of the local British consul.

Finally, on 18 September, The Times duly printed a brief update of affairs stating: "The Marquis of Waterford, who some time since received some serious injuries in what his Lordship and his friends are pleased to call a lark, at Bergen, is quite recovered, and has arrived we understand, in this country. One of the Marquis's party arrived at Douglas’s hotel here on Tuesday, and left next day for the south. We believe the whole party arrived in the Marquis's yacht at Aberdeen, from Norway."

== Connection to Spring-Heeled Jack ==
A popular rumour that was in circulation as early as the 1830s claimed that Lord Waterford was the main suspect behind the "Spring-Heeled Jack" phenomenon. However, as that character's acts continued after his death in 1859, Waterford cannot be given sole responsibility.

That Lord Waterford had some role has been accepted by several modern authors, who suggest that a humiliating experience with a woman and a police officer could have given him the idea of creating the character as a way of "getting even" with police and women in general.

They speculate that he could have designed (with the help of friends who were experts in applied mechanics) some sort of apparatus for special spring-heeled boots, and that he may have practised fire-spitting techniques in order to increase the unnatural appearance of his character. They also note the embroidered coat of arms with a "W" letter observed by the servant boy during the Ashworth incident, a notorious coincidence with his title's territorial designation.

Indeed, Waterford was frequently in the news in the late 1830s for drunken brawling, brutal jokes and vandalism, and was said to do anything for a bet; his irregular behaviour and his contempt for women earned him the moniker "the Mad Marquess", and it is also known that he was present in the London area at the time the first Spring Heeled Jack incidents took place. He was pointed to as the perpetrator by the Revd E. C. Brewer in 1880, who attested that Waterford "used to amuse himself by springing on travellers unawares, to frighten them, and from time to time others have followed his silly example".

An 1838 news report referred to "that turbulent piece of aristocracy" and his "nocturnal vagaries in the neighbourhood of Melton", adding that his "name in many quarters is regarded with as much terror as that of Spring-heeled Jack himself".

== Sportsman ==
Lord Waterford was a keen horseman and in 1840 he entered two horses in the Grand National Steeplechase, regarded today as the most famous race over jumps in the world. Waterford chose to ride one of the horses, The Sea, himself but was sent off in a field of thirteen runners as a totally unconsidered outsider. Reporters noted that, at one stage during the four-and-a-half mile contest, The Sea was almost half a mile behind the leaders, but Waterford persisted and completed the course to finish last of four to complete the course.

== Marriage, death and legacy ==
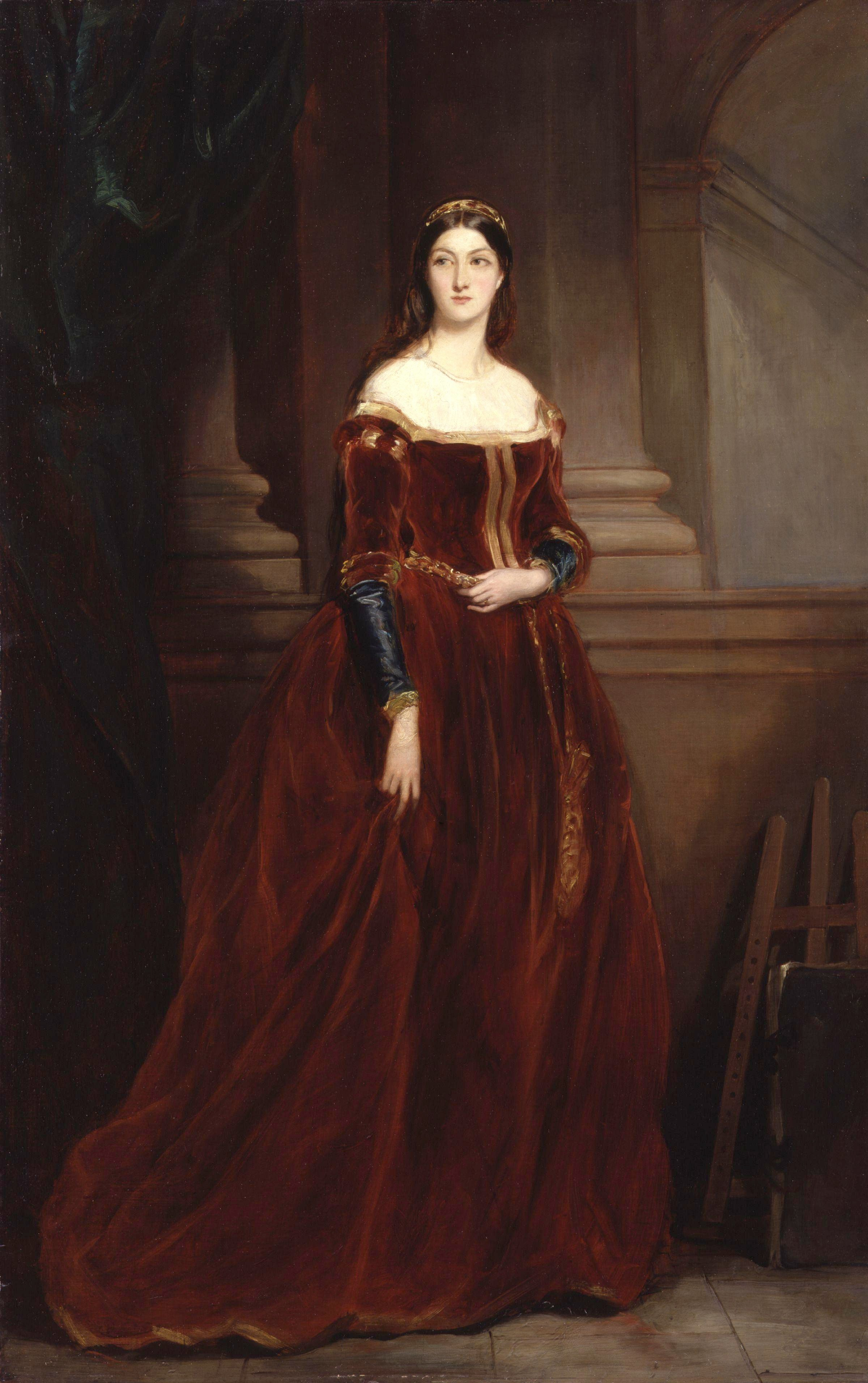
Henry Beresford's wife Louisa, by Francis Grant, 1859

In 1842, Lord Waterford married the Hon. Louisa Stuart, daughter of Charles Stuart, 1st Baron Stuart de Rothesay. He and his wife settled at Curraghmore House in Ireland, where he reportedly led an exemplary life until he died in a horse-riding accident in 1859.

Spring-Heeled Jack remained notionally active for decades after, which leads the aforementioned modern researchers to the same conclusion as Brewer's: Waterford may well have been responsible for the first attacks, while it was up to other pranksters who occasionally imitated him to continue the task.

Memorial fountain in Ford, Northumberland

Peerage of Ireland
Preceded by Henry Beresford	Marquess of Waterford; 1826–1859	Succeeded by John Beresford
