= Henry Beresford, 2nd Marquess of Waterford =

Irish peer

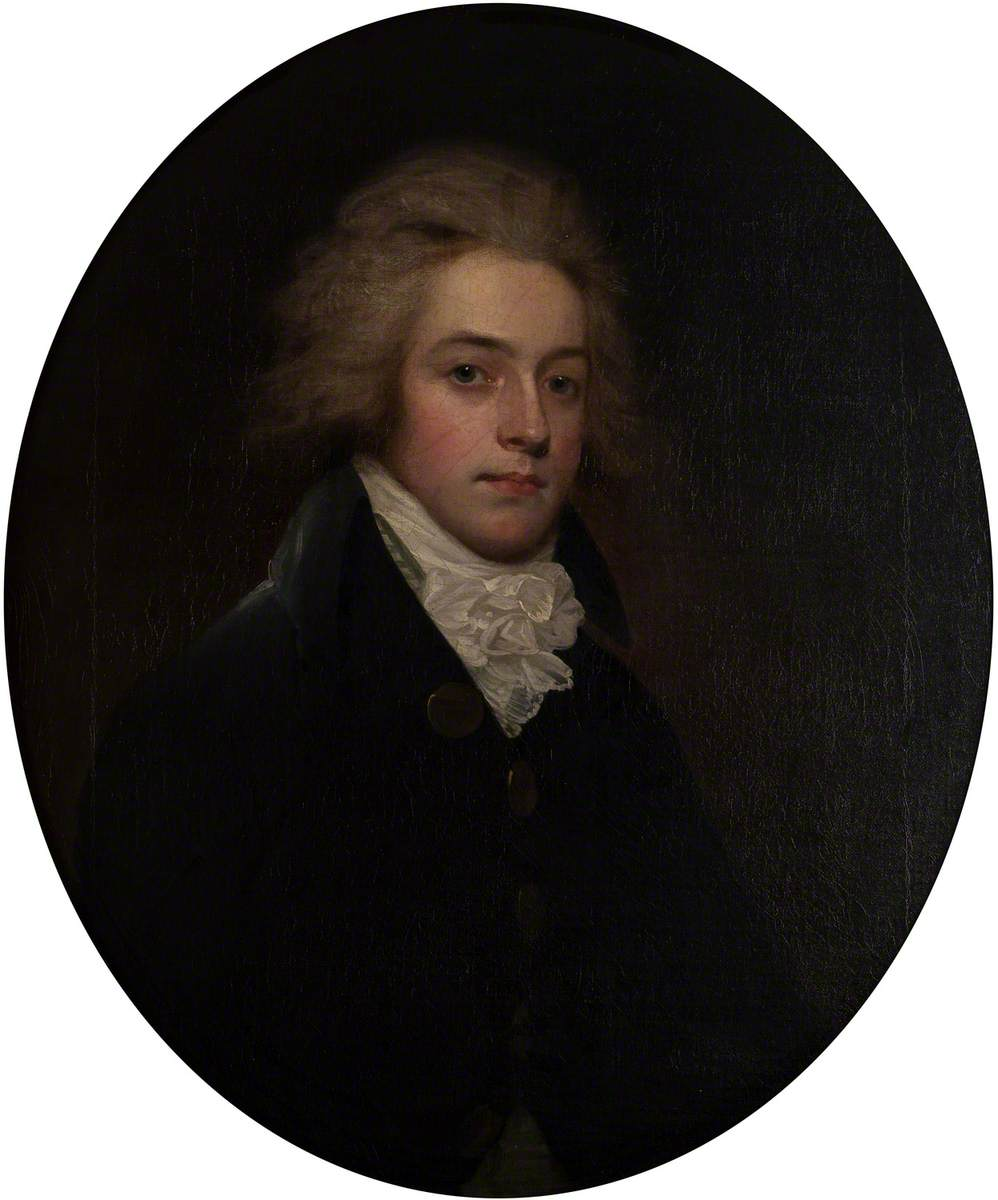
Portrait by William Beechey, 1790, age 18.

Henry de la Poer Beresford, 2nd Marquess of Waterford, KP, PC (Ire) (23 May 1772 – 16 July 1826) styled Lord Le Poer from 1783 until 1789 and Earl of Tyrone from 1789 to 1800, was an Irish peer.

== Early life ==
Beresford was the eldest surviving son of George Beresford, 1st Marquess of Waterford and the former Elizabeth Monck (a granddaughter of Henry Bentinck, 1st Duke of Portland). Among his siblings were the Most Rev. Lord John Beresford, Archbishop of Armagh, Lord George Beresford, Lady Isabella Beresford (wife of Sir John Brydges), and Lady Elizabeth Louisa Beresford (wife of Maj.-Gen. Sir Denis Pack and Sir Thomas Reynell, 6th Baronet). His elder half-brothers were Admiral Sir John Beresford, 1st Baronet and Lt.-Gen. William Carr Beresford, 1st Viscount Beresford, respectively.

== Career ==
Beresford entered the Irish House of Commons for County Londonderry in 1790 and sat for the constituency until the Act of Union. In 1798, he also stood for Coleraine but chose not to sit. Beresford became Marquess of Waterford in 1800 after the death of George Beresford, 1st Marquess of Waterford and was appointed a Knight of the Order of St Patrick on 14 March 1806.

== Personal life ==
Beresford married Lady Susanna Carpenter, daughter of George Carpenter, 2nd Earl of Tyrconnell and Sarah Delaval, on 29 August 1805. Through this marriage the Marquesses of Waterford acquired Ford Castle in Northumberland. They had eight children, of whom five died young:

- George de la Poer Beresford, Earl of Tyrone (1810–1824)
- Lady Sarah Elizabeth Beresford (1807–1884), who married Henry Chetwynd-Talbot, 18th Earl of Shrewsbury (also 18th Earl of Waterford and 3rd Earl Talbot), in 1828.
- Henry de la Poer Beresford, 3rd Marquess of Waterford (1811–1859), who married Hon. Louisa Stuart, second daughter of Charles Stuart, 1st Baron Stuart de Rothesay, in 1842.
- Lord William de la Poer Beresford (1812–1850), soldier
- John de la Poer Beresford, 4th Marquess of Waterford (1814–1866), who married Christiana Leslie, sister of Sir John Leslie, 1st Baronet, and third daughter of Col. Charles Powell Leslie in 1843.
- Lady Susan Henrietta Beresford (1815–1827)
- Lord James de la Poer Beresford (1816–1841), soldier
- Lady Elizabeth Catherine Caroline Beresford (1818–1826)

Lord Waterford died on 16 July 1826 and was succeeded in the marquessate by his eldest son, Henry.

Parliament of Ireland
Preceded by Edward Cary; Thomas Conolly	Member of Parliament for County Londonderry; 1790–1801; With: Thomas Conolly 1790–1800; Hon. Charles William Stewart 1800–1801	Succeeded by Parliament of the United Kingdom
Preceded by John Staunton Rochfort; William Domville Stanley Monck	Member of Parliament for Coleraine; 1798; With: John Beresford	Succeeded by John Beresford; Walter Jones
Peerage of Ireland
Preceded by George Beresford	Marquess of Waterford; 1800–1826	Succeeded by Henry Beresford
