= Beresford (name) =

Beresford (/ˈbɛrɪsfərd/) is an English name. It may refer to the following notable people:

== Given name ==
- Beresford Baker (1847–1933), Irish first-class cricketer
- Beresford Clark (1902–1968), British broadcaster
- Beresford Craddock (1898–1976), British Conservative politician
- Beresford Egan (1905–1984), British satirical draughtsman, painter, novelist, actor, costume designer and playwright
- Beresford Graham, 5th Duke of Montrose (1852–1925), Scottish nobleman
- Beresford Horsley (1880–1923), English cricketer
- Beresford Kidd (1864–1948), Anglican priest and Church historian
- Beresford Melville (1857–1931), British Conservative politician
- Beresford Potter (1853–1931), Archdeacon in Cyprus and Syria
- Beresford Richards (1914–1982), Canadian politician

== Surname ==
- Anna Beresford (1806–1866), British marine zoologist,
- Bruce Beresford (born 1940), Australian film director
- Daisy Radcliffe Beresford (1879–1939), British painter and decorative artist
- Lord Charles Beresford (1846–1919), British Admiral and Member of Parliament
- Claude Richard Beresford (1888–1945), Australian journalist
- David Beresford (1947–2016), South African author, journalist
- Elisabeth Beresford (1926–2010), British children's author
- George Beresford (disambiguation), several people including –
  - George Beresford, 1st Marquess of Waterford (1735–1800), Irish peer
  - George Beresford (clergyman) (1765–1841), Irish clergyman
  - Lord George Beresford (1781–1839), Irish-born British politician
  - George Charles Beresford (1864–1938), Victorian studio photographer
- Harry Beresford (1863–1944), British stage and film actor
- Henry Beresford, 2nd Marquess of Waterford (1772–1826), Irish peer
- Henry Beresford, 3rd Marquess of Waterford (1811–1859), Irish peer
- Herbert Beresford (1880–1938), Canadian land surveyor
- J. D. Beresford (1873–1947), English writer
- John Beresford (disambiguation), several people including –
  - Lord John Beresford, the Archbishop of Armagh (Church of Ireland)
  - John Beresford (statesman) (1738–1805), Irish statesman
  - Sir John Beresford, 1st Baronet (1766–1844), British naval officer and politician
  - John Claudius Beresford (1766–1846), Irish politician,
- Julius Beresford (1868–1959), English rower, Jack Beresford's father
- Lucy Beresford, British writer and psychotherapist
- Marcus Beresford (disambiguation), several people including
  - Marcus Beresford, 1st Earl of Tyrone (1694–1763), Irish peer
  - Lord Marcus Beresford (1846–1922), British equerry and racing manager
  - Marcus Beresford (1818–1890), British Conservative Party politician
- Marlon Beresford (born 1969), English former footballer
- Maurice Beresford (1920–2005), English economic historian
- Meg Beresford (born 1937), General Secretary of the Campaign for Nuclear Disarmament 1985–1990
- Paul Beresford (born 1946), British Conservative Party politician
- Peter Beresford (born 1945), British writer, academic, researcher and activist
- Randal Beresford (died 1681), Irish politician and baronet
- Senga Beresford, Scottish politician
- Steve Beresford (born 1950), British musician
- Ted Beresford (1910–1990), British Professional wrestler
- Tristam Beresford (disambiguation), several people including –
- Sir Tristam Beresford, 1st Baronet (died 1673), Irish soldier and politician
- Sir Tristram Beresford, 3rd Baronet (1669–1701), Irish soldier and politician
- William Beresford (politician) (1797–1883), British Conservative politician
- William Carr Beresford, 1st Viscount Beresford (1768–1856), British general who fought in the Peninsular War
- Lord William Beresford (1847–1900), Irish recipient of the VC

== Fictional characters ==
- Tommy and Tuppence Beresford, detectives created by Agatha Christie
- Sir Raleigh Beresford, Father Brown (2013 TV series), series 3 episode 2, "The Curse of Amenhotep"
- Beresford Bear, created by Australian children's author Elisabeth Sophia
- John Beresford Tipton, the title benefactor of The Millionaire (TV series), a 1955–1960 American television series
- Beresford, a crane on the Mainland in Thomas & Friends: Journey Beyond Sodor.

== See also ==
- Beresford baronets
