= Arthur Beresford, 6th Baron Decies =

Anglo-Irish army officer (1915–1992)

The Right Honourable The Lord Decies DFC

Personal details
- Born: Arthur George Marcus Douglas de la Poer Beresford; 15 April 1915 Newcastle upon Tyne
- Died: 7 November 1992 (aged 77) King's Lynn, Norfolk
- Spouse(s): Ann Trevor (m. 1937; died 1945) Diana Turner-Cain Galsworthy (m. 1945; died 1992)
- Children: 3
- Parent(s): John Beresford, 5th Baron Decies; Helen Vivien Gould

Arthur George Marcus Douglas de la Poer Beresford, 6th Baron Decies DFC (15 April 1915 – 7 November 1992) was an Anglo-Irish hereditary peer and soldier.

== Early life ==
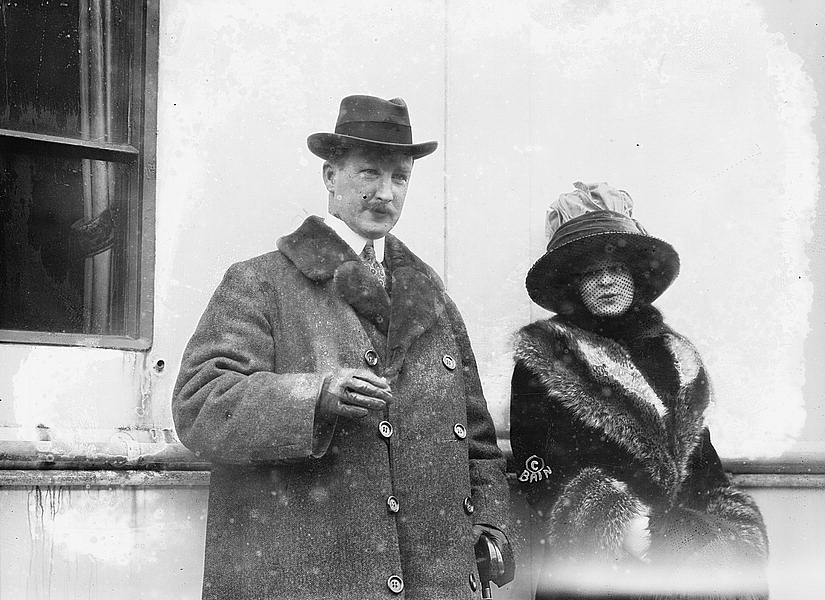
Lord Decies's parents, in 1911

Beresford was born on 15 April 1915. He was the youngest of three children born to John Beresford, 5th Baron Decies (1866–1944), aide-de-camp to the Prince Arthur, Duke of Connaught, and Helen Vivien Gould (1893–1931). From his parents marriage, he had two older sisters, Eileen Vivian de la Poer Horsley-Beresford and Catherine Moya Beresford. After his mother's death in 1931, his father married another American heiress, Elizabeth Wharton Drexel (widow of society leader Harry Lehr), in 1936.

His paternal grandparents were William Beresford, 3rd Baron Decies and the former Catherine Anne Dent. His maternal grandparents were American railroad tycoon George Jay Gould I and, his wife, former actress Edith Kingdon. Among his extended family were uncles William Beresford, 4th Baron Decies and cricketer Seton Beresford, and aunt Hon. Catherine Beresford (who married Edward J. M. Lumb). From his mother's side, his aunts and uncles included Kingdon Gould I, Marjorie Gwynne Gould, Jay Gould II, Edith Catherine Gould, and Gloria Gould.

== Career ==
Upon the death of his father, he inherited his father's titles and became Baron Decies.

He gained the rank of Flying Officer in the Royal Air Force Volunteer Reserve and fought in World War II. As an Air Gunner with 570 Squadron, he was wounded in action flying over Arnhem on September 23rd, 1944 during the squadron's final resupply mission in support of Operation Market Garden. It was for this action in support of American troops that he was awarded the Distinguished Flying Cross. The Imperial War Museum has a photo of Beresford being awarded the DFC in its online collection.

== Personal life ==
On 27 October 1937, Beresford married Ann Trevor in London, England. Ann, a daughter of Sidney Walter Trevor, died on 28 March 1945. They had no children.

On 12 September 1945, Lord Decies married Diana Mary (née Turner-Cain) Galsworthy (1916–2004) at Chapel Royal, Windsor, England. Diana was a daughter of W/Cdr. George Turner-Cain and Jessie Mary Smith and the widow of David William Arthur Galsworthy, a Major with the Royal Fusiliers, City of London Regiment who died in 1944, with whom she had one child, Anna Galsworthy. Together, Arthur and Diana were the parents of three children:

- Marcus Hugh Tristram de la Poer Beresford, 7th Baron Decies (b. 1948), who married Sarah Jane Gunnell, daughter of Col. Basil Gunnell, in 1970. They divorced in 1974 and he married Edel Jeannette Hendron, daughter of Vincent Ambrose Hendron, in 1981.
- Hon. Sarah Ann Vivien de la Poer Beresford (b. 1949), who married Joerg B. Schnapka, son of Dr. Herbert Schnapka, in 1975. They divorced in 1982 she married Lt. Andrew McMeekan, son of Thomas McMeekan, in 1992.
- Hon. Clare Antoinette Gabrielle de la Poer Beresford (b. 1956), who married Jorge Keochlin, son of Jose Edmondo Keochlin, in 1986. They divorced in 1997.

Lord Decies died on 7 November 1992 at King's Lynn, Norfolk.

Peerage of Ireland
Preceded by John Graham Hope Horsley de la Poer Beresford	Baron Decies; 1944–1992	Succeeded by Marcus Hugh Tristram de la Poer Beresford
