= William Beresford =

William Beresford may refer to:

- William Beresford (politician) (1797–1883), British politician
- William Beresford, 1st Baron Decies (1743–1819), Anglican Archbishop of Tuam, great-uncle of the above
- William Beresford, 1st Viscount Beresford (1768–1854), British Army general, nephew of the above
- William Horsley-Beresford, 3rd Baron Decies (1811–1893), Anglo-Irish peer
- Lord William Beresford (1847–1900), Irish Victoria Cross recipient, great-nephew of Viscount Beresford
- William Beresford, 4th Baron Decies (1865–1910), Anglo-Irish peer

== See also ==
- William Bereford (died 1326), English judge
