= Bolam =

Bolam may refer to:

== Places ==
England

- Bolam, County Durham
- Bolam, Northumberland
- Bolam West Houses, Northumberland

== Other uses ==
- Bolam (surname)
  - The Bolam Test, used to determine professional negligence

== See also ==
- Bank of London and Montreal, known as BOLAM
