= Hercules Rowley =

Anglo-Irish politician

Member of Parliament for County Londonderry
- In office 1703–1742 Serving with William Conolly, Arthur Dawson, Edward Cary
- Preceded by: Sir Tristram Beresford, Bt; William Jackson
- Succeeded by: Edward Cary; Hercules Langford Rowley

Personal details
- Born: 1679
- Died: 19 September 1742 (aged 62–63)
- Spouse: Frances Upton (m. 1705)
- Relations: Sir Hercules Langford, 1st Baronet (grandfather); Richard Wingfield (son-in-law); Edward Wingfield (grandson); Richard Wingfield (grandson)
- Children: Dorothy Wingfield, Viscountess Powerscourt; Hercules Langford Rowley
- Parent(s): Sir John Rowley; Mary Langford

Hercules Rowley (1679 – 19 September 1742) was an Anglo-Irish politician.

== Early life ==
He was the only son of Sir John Rowley who was knighted for his services at the time of the Restoration and the former Mary Langford eldest daughter and heiress of Sir Hercules Langford, 1st Baronet. His sister was Lettice Rowley wife of Arthur Loftus, 3rd Viscount Loftus. (Anne Rowley wife of Sir Tristram Beresford, 1st Baronet, and Mary Rowley wife of John Clotworthy, 1st Viscount Massereene were daughters of the John Rowley who was the great-grandfather of Hercules Rowley.)

In 1661, his grandfather Hercules Langford bought Lynch's Castle (located on the Summerhill Demesne in County Meath) and many other townlands from The Rt Rev. Dr. Henry Jones, the Lord Bishop of Meath.

== Career ==
Rowley was a Member of Parliament for County Londonderry in the Irish House of Commons between 1703 and his death in 1742. He was the uncle, by marriage, of the politician Henry Maxwell, with whom he clashed over proposals in 1721 to establish the Bank of Ireland.

== Personal life ==
On 3 January 1705, Rowley was married to Frances Upton, the sixth daughter of Arthur Upton of Castle Upton in County Antrium. Together, they were the parents of:

- Dorothy Beresford Rowley, who married Richard Wingfield, 1st Viscount Powerscourt, the son of Edward Wingfield and Eleanor (née Gore) Wingfield (daughter of Sir Arthur Gore, 1st Baronet), in 1727.
- Hercules Langford Rowley (c. 714–1794), who married Elizabeth Ormsby Upton, the only daughter of Clotworthy Upton (MP for the borough of Newton and County Antrim) and Jane Ormsby (daughter of John Ormsby MP for Kilmallock), in 1732.

Rowley died on 19 September 1742.

Parliament of Ireland
Preceded by Sir Tristram Beresford, Bt; William Jackson	Member of Parliament for County Londonderry; 1703–1742; With: William Conolly (1703–1729); Arthur Dawson (1729–1742); Edward Cary (1742)	Succeeded by Edward Cary; Hercules Langford Rowley
