= John Beresford =

John Beresford may refer to:

- John Beresford (Waterford MP) (1738–1805), Irish MP for Waterford
- John Claudius Beresford (1766–1846), Irish MP for Swords and Dublin, son of the above
- Sir John Beresford, 1st Baronet (1766–1844), Royal Navy admiral, nephew of the Waterford MP
- John Horsley-Beresford, 2nd Baron Decies (1773–1855), Anglo-Irish peer, nephew of the Waterford MP
- Lord John Beresford (1773–1862), Anglican Archbishop of Armagh, nephew of the Waterford MP
- John Beresford, 4th Marquess of Waterford (1814–1866), Irish peer and Church of Ireland minister, nephew of the above
- John Beresford, 5th Marquess of Waterford (1844–1895), Irish peer, son of the above
- John Beresford, 5th Baron Decies (1866–1944), Anglo-Irish army officer, polo player, great-great-nephew of the Waterford MP
- J. D. Beresford (John Davys Beresford, 1873–1947), English science fiction writer at the turn of the 20th century
- John Beresford (dean of Elphin and Ardagh) (fl. 1897–1954), Anglican priest in Ireland
- John Beresford, 8th Marquess of Waterford (1933–2015), Irish peer, great-grandson of the 5th Marquess
- John Beresford (footballer) (born 1966), English footballer

== See also ==
- Beresford (surname)
