= Henry Langford (disambiguation) =

Henry Langford was an English MP.

Henry Langford may also refer to:

- Henry Langford of the Langford baronets
- Captain Sir Henry Langford, fictional character in The Bolitho novels

== See also ==
- Harry Langford, Canadian football player
