= Richard Wingfield, 1st Viscount Powerscourt (third creation) =

Irish politician and peer

The Right Honourable The Viscount Powerscourt PC(I)

Member of Parliament for Boyle
- In office 1727–1743 Serving with Arthur French
- Preceded by: Henry King; Robert Sandford
- Succeeded by: Arthur French; Sir Robert King, Bt

Personal details
- Born: Richard Wingfield; 19 August 1697
- Died: 21 October 1751 (aged 54)
- Spouse(s): Anne Usher (m. 1721, died) Dorothy Beresford Rowley (m. 1727)
- Relations: Sir Arthur Gore, 1st Baronet (grandfather)
- Children: 4, including Edward Wingfield, 2nd Viscount Powerscourt and Richard Wingfield, 3rd Viscount Powerscourt
- Parent(s): Edward Wingfield; Eleanor Gore

Richard Wingfield, 1st Viscount Powerscourt PC (I) (19 August 1697 – 21 October 1751) was an Anglo-Irish politician and peer.

== Early life ==
Powerscourt was the son of Edward Wingfield, MP for County Sligo, and his wife, Eleanor Gore, a daughter of Sir Arthur Gore, 1st Baronet. He was a descendant of the uncle of Folliott Wingfield, 1st Viscount Powerscourt.

== Career ==
He sat in the Irish House of Commons as the Member of Parliament for Boyle between 1727 and 1743. On 4 February 1743 he was elevated to the Peerage of Ireland as Viscount Powerscourt, of Powerscourt in County Wicklow, and Baron Wingfield, of Wingfield in County Wexford, and he assumed his seat in the Irish House of Lords. In 1746 he was made a member of the Privy Council of Ireland.

Powerscourt was responsible for commissioning the German architect, Richard Cassels, to carry out extensive remodelling work on Powerscourt House between 1731 and 1741.

== Personal life ==
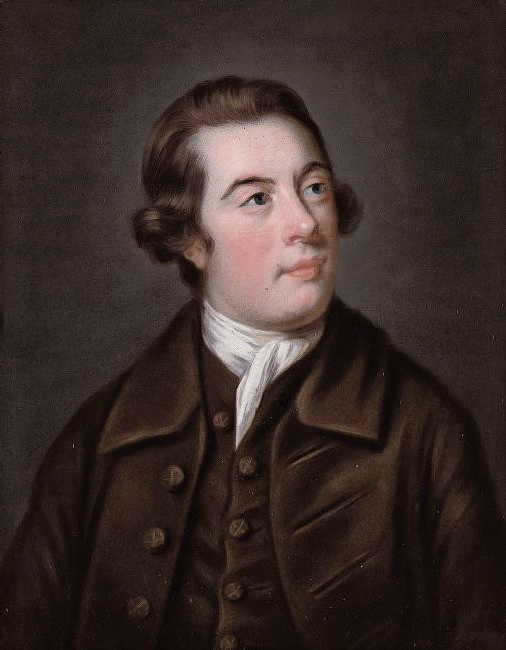
Portrait of his eldest son, Edward, by a member of the circle of Francis Cotes

On 30 August 1721, Powerscourt married Anne Usher, a daughter of Christopher Usher, of Usher's Quay, Dublin. After her death, he married Dorothy Beresford Rowley (c. 1705–1785) on 13 April 1727. His second wife was a daughter of Hercules Rowley, of Summer Hill, and the former Frances Upton (a younger daughter of Arthur Upton, of Castle Upton). Together they had four children, including:

- Hon. Frances Wingfield (1728–1794), who married John Gore, 1st Baron Annaly, in 1747.
- Edward Wingfield, 2nd Viscount Powerscourt (1729–1764), an MP for Stockbridge who died unmarried in 1764.
- Richard Wingfield, 3rd Viscount Powerscourt (1730–1788), an MP for County Wicklow who married Lady Amelia Stratford, daughter of John Stratford, 1st Earl of Aldborough, in 1760.
- Hon. Isabella Wingfield (d. 1808), who married Sir Charles Style, 5th Baronet, in 1770.

Lord Powerscourt died on 21 October 1751. He was succeeded in his titles by his eldest son, Edward. Edward was in turn succeeded by the first Viscount's second son, Richard.

Parliament of Ireland
Preceded by Henry King; Robert Sandford	Member of Parliament for Boyle; 1727–1743; With: Arthur French	Succeeded by Arthur French; Sir Robert King, Bt
Peerage of Ireland
New creation	Viscount Powerscourt; Third creation 1743–1751	Succeeded by Edward Wingfield
