= Coleraine (Parliament of Ireland constituency) =

Pre-1801 Irish constituency

Coordinates: 55.132°N 6.668°W

- Former borough constituency for the Irish House of Commons
- County: County Londonderry
- Borough: Coleraine

–1801
- Seats: 2
- Replaced by: Coleraine

Coleraine was a constituency represented in the Irish House of Commons from 1611 to 1800. Between 1725 and 1793 Catholics and those married to Catholics could not vote.

== History ==
In the Patriot Parliament of 1689 summoned by James II, Coleraine was not represented. The borough was disenfranchised under the terms of the Acts of Union 1800.

== Members of Parliament ==
- 1613–1615 Sir Barnabas O'Brien, later Earl of Thomond and John Wilkinson
- 1634–1635 George Bland and Edward Rowley
- 1639–1645 Charles Monck (not duly elected - replaced by Edmond Cossens) and Thomas Harman
- 1661–1666 Randal Beresford and Stephen Cuppage (died and replaced 1666 by William Jackson)

=== 1692–1801 ===
Election	First MP		Second MP	
1689	Coleraine was not represented in the Patriot Parliament			
1692	John Davys		William Leslie	
1695	Sir Arthur Langford, 2nd Bt		Samuel Jackson	
September 1703	Sir Arthur Langford, 2nd Bt		Richard Gorges (Note: Also elected for Bandonbridge in 1703, for which he chose to sit)	
1703	Sir Arthur Langford, 2nd Bt		Thomas Pearce	
1713	Frederick Hamilton	Whig	George Lowther	Whig
1715	Frederick Hamilton	Whig	Sir Marcus Beresford, 4th Bt	Whig
1721	Frederick Hamilton	Whig	Francis Burton	
1727	Henry Carey		Thomas Jackson	
1751	Henry Carey		Richard Jackson	
1757	Hamilton Gorges		Richard Jackson	
1761	Lord La Poer		Richard Jackson	
1763	George Paul Monck		Richard Jackson	
1768	John Beresford (Note: Also elected for County Waterford in 1768, for which he chose to sit)		Richard Jackson	
August 1768	Theophilus Jones		Richard Jackson	
1776	Hon. Richard Annesley		Richard Jackson	
1783	John Beresford (Note: Also elected for County Waterford in 1783, for which he chose to sit)		Richard Jackson	
October 1783	Arthur Wolfe		Richard Jackson	
1789	George Jackson		John Beresford (Note: Also elected for County Waterford in 1789, for which he chose to sit)	
1791	George Jackson		George FitzGerald Hill	
1795	George Jackson		William Domville Stanley Monck	
1796	John Staunton Rochfort		William Domville Stanley Monck	
January 1798	Earl of Tyrone (Note: Also elected for County Londonderry in 1798, for which he chose to sit)		John Beresford (Note: Also elected for County Waterford in 1798, for which he chose to sit)	
1798	John Beresford		Walter Jones	
1801	Succeeded by the Westminster constituency Coleraine			

== Bibliography ==
- O'Hart, John (2007). The Irish and Anglo-Irish Landed Gentry: When Cromwell came to Ireland. Vol. II. Heritage Books. ISBN 0-7884-1927-7.
- Leigh Rayment's historical List of Members of the Irish House of Commons. Cites: Johnston-Liik, Edith Mary (2002). The History of the Irish Parliament 1692-1800 (6 volumes). Ulster Historical Foundation.
