= Baron Decies =

Title in the Peerage of Ireland

Barony of Decies
- Blazon: Arms: Quarterly: 1st and 4th, Argent semée of Cross Crosslets fitchée three Fleurs-de-lis within a Bordure engrailed all Sable (Beresford); 2nd and 3rd, Argent a Chief indented Sable (de la Poer); a Mullet Argent for difference.; Crests: A Dragon's Head erased Azure transfixed in the neck with a broken Tilting Spear Or the Point broken off Argent transfixing the upper jaw charged with a Mullet for difference.; Supporters: On either side an Angel proper vested Argent crined and winged Or each holding in the exterior hand a Sword erect of the first pommelled and hilted of the second and charged on the breast with a Mullet for difference.
- Creation date: 21 Dec 1812
- Created by: The Prince Regent on behalf of King George III
- Peerage: Peerage of Ireland
- First holder: William Beresford, 1st Baron Decies
- Present holder: Marcus Hugh Tristram de la Poer Beresford, 7th Baron Decies
- Heir apparent: the Hon. Robert Marcus Duncan de la Poer Beresford
- Status: Extant
- Seat: Straffan Lodge
- Motto: NIL NISI CRUCE; Nothing without the Cross

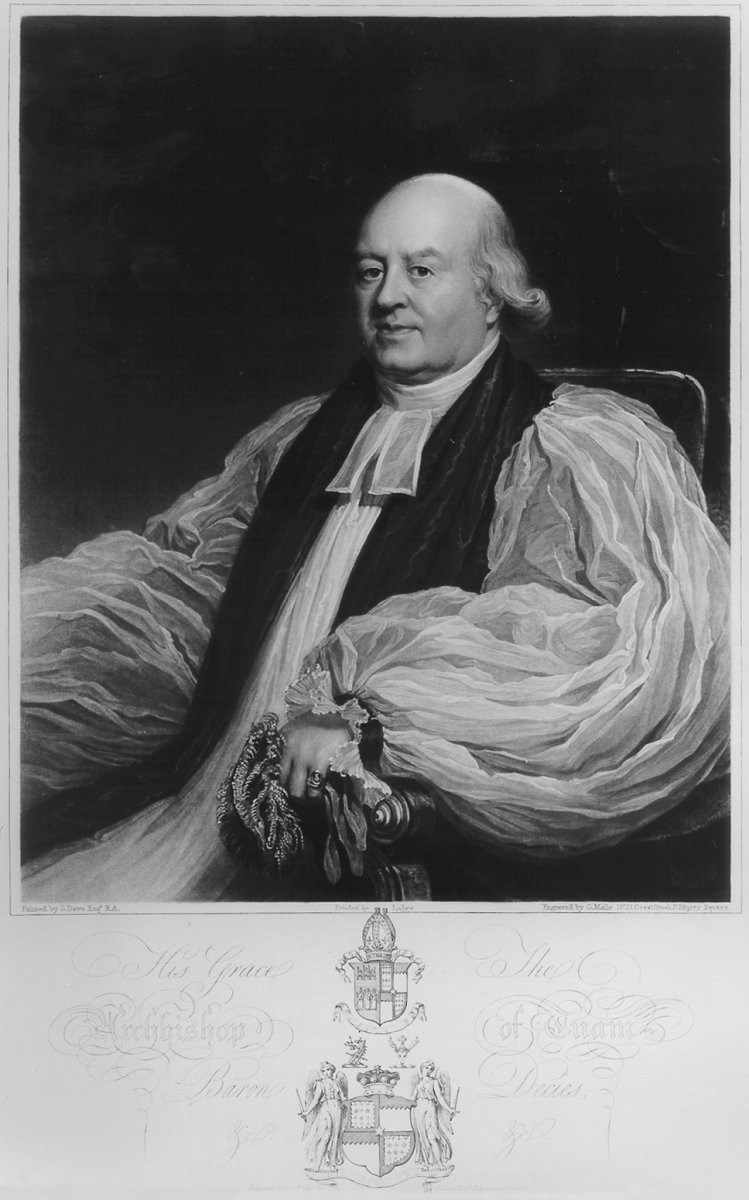
William Beresford, 1st Baron Decies

Baron Decies (/ˈdiːʃiːz/ DEE-sheez), of Decies in the County of Waterford, is a title in the Peerage of Ireland. It was created in 1812 for the Right Reverend William Beresford, Archbishop of Tuam from 1794 to 1819. He was the third son of Marcus Beresford, 1st Earl of Tyrone, and the younger brother of George Beresford, 1st Marquess of Waterford. His son, the second Baron, married Charlotta Philadelphia Horsley, the only daughter and heiress of Robert Horsley of Bolam Hall in Northumberland, which he built (using stone from the ruined ancient castle on the site) on the estate purchased in 1727 by his father John Horsley. In accordance with the terms of his wife's inheritance he assumed the additional surname of Horsley in 1810. However, none of the subsequent barons have held this surname. His grandson, the fifth Baron, was a Major in the Army and also sat in the House of Lords as an Irish representative peer from 1912 to 1944. As of 2013 the title is held by his grandson, the seventh Baron, who succeeded his father in 1992.

The family seat is Straffan Lodge, near Straffan, County Kildare.

== Barons Decies (1812) ==
- William Beresford, 1st Baron Decies (1743–1819)
- John Horsley-Beresford, 2nd Baron Decies (1773–1855)
- William Robert John Horsley-Beresford, 3rd Baron Decies (1811–1893)
- William Marcus de la Poer Beresford, 4th Baron Decies (1865–1910)
- John Graham Hope de la Poer Beresford, 5th Baron Decies (1866–1944)
- Arthur George Marcus Douglas de la Poer Beresford, 6th Baron Decies (1915–1992)
- Marcus Hugh Tristram de la Poer Beresford, 7th Baron Decies (born 1948)

The heir apparent is the present holder's son, Hon. Robert Marcus Duncan de la Poer Beresford.

== Family tree ==
Family tree of the Marquess of Waterford and related titles

Baron Power, of Curraghmore, 1535
Richard Power d. 1539; 1st Baron Power of Curraghmore
Piers Power d. 1545; 2nd Baron Power of Curraghmore	John Power; 1516–1592; 3rd Baron Power of Curraghmore
Richard Power d. 1607; 4th Baron Power of Curraghmore
Baronet of Coleraine in the County of Londonderry, 1665
Tristram Beresford d. 1673; 1st Baronet	John Power d. 1661; 5th Baron Power of Curraghmore
Earl of Tyrone and Viscount Decies (2nd creation), 1673
Randal Beresford d. 1681; 2nd Baronet	Richard Power; 1630–1690; 1st Earl of Tyrone, etc., 6th Baron Power
Tristram Beresford; 1669–1701; 3rd Baronet	John Power c. 1665–1693; 2nd Earl of Tyrone, etc., 7th Baron Power	James Power; 1667–1704; 3rd Earl of Tyrone, etc., 8th Baron Power
Heir to the Barony of Tyrone outlawed, 1688 and extinct, 1704; Earldom of Tyrone (2nd creation) and Viscount Decies extinct, 1704
Viscount Tyrone and Baron Beresford (1st creation), of Beresford, in the County of Cavan, 1720; Earl of Tyrone (3rd creation), 1746	Baron La Poer retrospectively granted, 1767
Marcus Beresford; 1694–1763; 1st Earl of Tyrone, etc., 4th Baronet	Katherine Power d. 1769; Baroness La Poer
Baron Tyrone, 1786; Marquess of Waterford, 1789	Baron Decies, of Decies in the County of Waterford, 1812
George Beresford; 1735–1800; 1st Marquess of Waterford, etc., 2nd Earl of Tyrone, etc., 5th Baronet	William Beresford, 1st Baron Decies; 1743–1819; 1st Baron Decies
Beresford, later Beresford-Peirse baronets of Bagnall, 1814	Baron Beresford (2nd creation), of Albuera and Dungarvan in the County of Waterford, 1814; Viscount Beresford, of Beresford in the County of Stafford, 1823
Henry Beresford; 1772–1826; 2nd Marquess of Waterford, etc., 3rd Earl of Tyrone, etc., 6th Baronet	John Poo Beresford; 1766–1844; 1st Baronet of Bagnall	William Carr Beresford; 1768–1854; 1st Viscount Beresford, etc.	Louisa Beresford d. 1851	John Horsley-Beresford; 1774–1865; 2nd Baron Decies
Viscountcy Beresford and Barony Beresford of Albuera and Dungarvan extinct, 1844
Henry Beresford; 1811–1859; 3rd Marquess of Waterford, etc., 4th Earl of Tyrone, etc., 7th Baronet	John Beresford; 1814–1866; 4th Marquess of Waterford, etc., 5th Earl of Tyrone, etc., 8th Baronet	George de la Poer Beresford; 1811–1873; 2nd Baronet of Bagnall	William Robert John Horsley Beresford; 1811–1893; 3rd Baron Decies
Baron Beresford (3rd creation) of Metemmeh and Curraghmore in the County of Waterford, 1916
John Henry Beresford; 1844–1895; 5th Marquess of Waterford, etc., 6th Earl of Tyrone, etc., 9th Baronet	Charles William de la Poer Beresford; 1846–1919; Baron Beresford of Metemmeh and Curraghmore	Henry Monson de la Poer Beresford-Peirse; 1850–1926; 3rd Baronet of Bagnall	William Marcus de la Poer Horsley Beresford; 1865–1910; 4th Baron Decies	John Graham Hope Horsley de la Poer Beresford; 1866–1944; 5th Baron Decies
Barony Beresford (3rd creation) extinct, 1919
Henry Beresford; 1875–1911; 6th Marquess of Waterford, etc., 7th Earl of Tyrone, etc., 10th Baronet	Henry Bernard de la Poer Beresford-Peirse; 1875–1949; 4th Baronet of Bagnall
John Charles Beresford; 1901–1934; 7th Marquess of Waterford, etc., 8th Earl of Tyrone, etc., 11th Baronet	Henry Campbell de la Poer Beresford-Peirse; 1905–1972; 5th Baronet of Bagnall	Arthur George Marcus Douglas de la Poer Beresford; 1915–1992; 6th Baron Decies
John Hubert Beresford; 1933–2015; 8th Marquess of Waterford, etc., 9th Earl of Tyrone, etc., 12th Baronet	Henry Grant de la Poer Beresford-Peirse; 1933–2013; 6th Baronet of Bagnall	Marcus Hugh Tristram de la Poer Beresford b. 1948; 7th Baron Decies
Henry Nicholas Beresford b. 1958; 9th Marquess of Waterford, etc., 10th Earl of Tyrone, etc., 13th Baronet	Henry Njers de la Poer Beresford-Peirse b. 1969; 7th Baronet of Bagnall
Richard John Beresford b. 1987 styled Earl of Tyrone	Harry Tamlyn de la Poer Beresford-Peirse b. 2007	Robert Marcus Duncan de la Poer Beresford b. 1988
Heir apparent to the Marquessate of Waterford	Heir apparent to the Barony Decies	Heir apparent to the Barony Decies

== See also ==
- Marquess of Waterford
- Viscount Beresford
- Baron Beresford
