= Margaret Dale =

Margaret Dale may refer to:

- Margaret Dale (actress) (1876–1972), American stage and film actress
- Margaret Dale (dancer) (1922–2010), British dancer
- Meg Dale (Margaret Dale), a character on the American soap opera Love of Life

== See also ==
- Margaret Daly (born 1938), British Conservative Party politician
