= Bolam Lake Country Park =

Country park in Northumberland, England

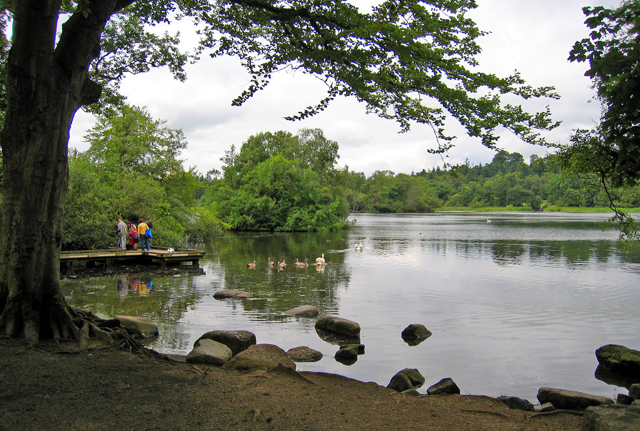

- Location within Northumberland
- Interactive map of Bolam Lake Country Park
- Location: near Bolam
- OS grid: NZ 081 818
- Coordinates: 55°7′49″N 1°52′28″W
- Area: 26.48 hectares (65.4 acres)
- Created: 1972
- Operator: Northumberland County Council
- Website: Bolam Lake Country Park

Bolam Lake Country Park is a country park in Northumberland, England, near the village of Bolam and about 9 miles (14 km) west of Morpeth. It is signposted off the A696 road from Belsay.

== History ==
The lake and woodlands were laid out by John Dobson for Reverend John Beresford, Baron Decies, the owner of the Bolam estate, who wanted to provide work for local people during a period of economic decline. The project, started in 1816, took three years to complete. The site was landscaped, and designed to provide picturesque views of nearby features in the countryside. The lake was created from a swampy area known as Bolam Bog.

By 1945 the grounds had grown wild; in 1972 the estate was purchased by Northumberland County Council in order to create a country park. In 2016 the lake and landscaped surroundings celebrated their 200th anniversary.

== Description ==
The park, area 26.48 hectares (65.4 acres); has a lake, woodlands and open grassland. There are walks throughout the park, including a fully accessible path around the lake.

Wildlife in the park includes roe deer and red squirrels; there are swans and other waterfowl on the lake. Woodland birds to be seen include great spotted woodpecker, bullfinch, nuthatch and treecreeper.

There is a visitor centre and café next to the Boathouse Wood Car Park, to the north of the lake.
