= Marcus Beresford, 7th Baron Decies =

Anglo-Irish hereditary peer (born 1948)

The Right Honourable The Lord Decies
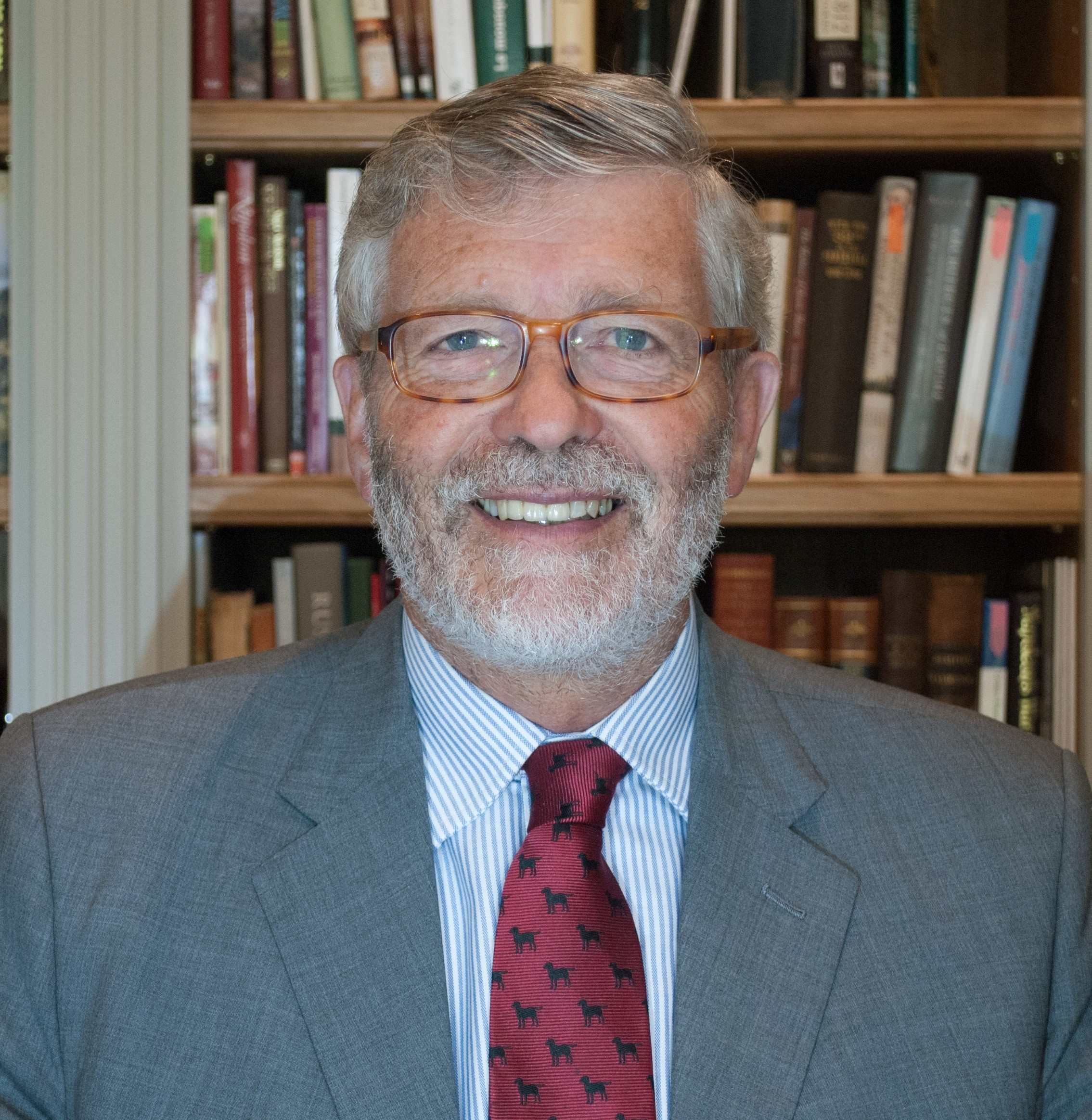
- Born: Marcus Hugh Tristram de la Poer Beresford; 5 August 1948 (age 78)
- Education: Aiglon College; St Columba's College, Dublin; Trinity College Dublin
- Spouses: Sarah Jane Gunnell (m. 1970; div. 1974) Edel Jeannette Hendron (after 1981)
- Children: 4
- Parent(s): Arthur Beresford, 6th Baron Decies; Diana Turner-Cain Galsworthy

Marcus Hugh Tristram de la Poer Beresford, 7th Baron Decies (born 5 August 1948), is an Anglo-Irish hereditary peer.

== Early life ==
Beresford is the only son of Arthur Beresford, 6th Baron Decies and Diana (née Turner-Cain) Galsworthy. His mother, a widow of Maj. David W. A. Galsworthy, was a daughter of W/Cdr George Turner-Cain. He has two sisters, Sarah Ann Vivien de la Poer Beresford and model Clare Antoinette Gabrielle de la Poer Beresford.

His paternal grandfather was John Beresford, 5th Baron Decies, an Irish representative peer who married two American heiresses, his grandmother Helen Gould (daughter of American railroad executive George Jay Gould I), and after her death, Elizabeth Wharton Drexel (a daughter of Joseph William Drexel, who had previously been married to Harry Lehr). When asked how to pronounce his name, his grandfather Lord Decies told The Literary Digest: "With ci as in conscience it is dee-shees, and Beresford is berysford."

== Education and career ==
He was educated initially at Aiglon College, Chesières-Villars, Switzerland, and from 1962 to 1967 at St Columba's College, Dublin. He graduated from Trinity College Dublin, with a Master of Letters (M.Litt.). Beresford practiced as a solicitor and rose to be Chairman of A&L Goodbody, the leading Irish corporate law firm. (Note: He won the Law Society's Patrick O'Connor Memorial Prize) He was a fellow of the Chartered Institute of Arbitrators.

He succeeded to the title of 7th Baron Decies, of Decies, County Waterford in 1992.

=== Other activities ===
Lord Decies was a trustee of the Alfred Beit Foundation from 1999 to 2014 and chairman from 2008 to 2014. He is also a trustee of the Apollo Foundation. He has also been involved in the world of education being a member of the boards of Alexandra College in Dublin, Hewetson's School in Millicent, Ireland (of which he was chairman from 1992 to 1995), and St Columba's College, Dublin, Ireland.

== Family ==
He married, firstly, Sarah Jane Gunnell, daughter of Colonel Basil Gunnell on 11 April 1970. They divorced in 1974. He remarried in 1981 to Edel Jeannette Hendron. Since 1989 the couple have resided in Straffan, County Kildare, (Note: Straffan Lodge, originally dating from the 1700s, was where the Irish artist Francis Bacon lived from 1909 to 1926; a previous owner, Robert Guinness of the Guinness banking family, bought the property in 1968 and lived there for 20 years.) and have three children:

- Hon. Louisa Katherine de la Poer Beresford (b. 1984)
- Hon. Robert Marcus Duncan de la Poer Beresford (b. 1988)
- Hon. David George Morley Hugh de la Poer Beresford (b. 1991)

=== Interests ===
The couple are equine enthusiasts, and trained racehorses locally with Arthur Moore for many years. (Note: including Marcus du Berlais, which placed second and third in the 2004 and 2005 Grand Nationals, and the mare Fag an Bealach.) His wife is a keen sportswoman who fly-fishes for Ireland and is involved with charitable causes, including the Irish Haemophilia Society.

He has an interest in history stimulated by his ancestors, William Beresford, 1st Baron Decies (1743–1819), who was the Archbishop of Tuam, and General William Carr Beresford, 1st Viscount Beresford, 1st Marquis of Campo Maior, GCB, GCH, PC (1768–1854), who was a general in the British Army and a Marshal in the Portuguese Army; he fought alongside The Duke of Wellington in the Peninsular War and held the office of Master-General of the Ordnance in 1828 in Wellington's first ministry. In 2019 the Irish Academic Press published his biography of the general.

Beresford is a member of both the Irish and British Commissions for Military History. He is chairman of the trustees of the British Cemetery, Elvas, a member of the Friends of the Lines of Torres Vedras and the Waterford Historical Society.

== Arms ==
Coat of arms of Marcus Beresford, 7th Baron Decies
Crest A Dragon's Head erased Azure transfixed in the neck with a broken Tilting Spear Or the Point broken off Argent transfixing the upper jaw charged with a Mullet for difference. Escutcheon Quarterly: 1st and 4th, Argent semée of Cross Crosslets fitchée three Fleurs-de-lis within a Bordure engrailed all Sable (Beresford); 2nd and 3rd, Argent a Chief indented Sable (de la Poer); a Mullet Argent for difference. Supporters On either side an Angel proper vested Argent crined and winged Or each holding in the exterior hand a Sword erect of the first pommelled and hilted of the second and charged on the breast with a Mullet for difference. Motto NIL NISI CRUCE; Nothing without the Cross.

== Bibliography ==
Journals

- "Ireland in French strategy 1691-1789", Post Graduate thesis (M.Litt.)
- "François Thurot and the French attack at Carrickfergus, 1759-60", The Irish Sword, X (41), 255-74.
- "Ireland in French Strategy during the American War of Independence, 1776-83", The Irish Sword, XII (49), 285-97 and XIII (50), 20-29.
- "William Carr Beresford and the capture of the Cape Colony and the expedition to the River Plate 1805-1806", The Irish Sword XXIX (P. 240 – 262)
- "Francois Thurot, the Irish connection", Journal of the Cork Historical & Archaeological Society, LXXVIII (1973), 143-50.
- "The Peninsular romance of Lieutenant Waldron Kelly and Ana Ludovina de Aguilar", The Irish Sword, XXXII (129) 2020, 299–316.

Books

- Marcus de la Poer Beresford and Katarzyna Krenz. "From Napoleon to the Nazis: The Mysterious Story of Marshal Beresford’s Silver / Od Napoleona do nazistów: Tajemnicza historia sreber marszałka Beresforda". ISBN 978-1-7391497-1-0 2023
- "Marshal William Carr Beresford: ‘The ablest man I have yet seen with the army’ (ISBN 978-1-78855-032-1) 2019
- "Peninsular and Waterloo General: Sir Denis Pack and the War Against Napoleon (ISBN 978-1-399083-201) 2022

== Notes ==
Peerage of Ireland
Preceded by Arthur Beresford	Baron Decies; 1992–present	Incumbent; Heir-apparent: Hon. Robert Beresford
