= Tristram Beresford =

Tristam Beresford may refer to:

- Sir Tristram Beresford, 1st Baronet (died 1673), Irish MP for Londonderry County 1634, 1656–1658, 1661–1666
- Sir Tristram Beresford, 3rd Baronet (1669–1701), his grandson, Irish MP for Londonderry County 1692–1699
