= Sir Arthur Langford, 2nd Baronet =

Anglo-Irish lawyer and politician

Sir Arthur Langford, 2nd Baronet (circa 1652 – 29 March 1716) was an Anglo-Irish lawyer and politician.

Langford was the eldest son of Sir Hercules Langford, 1st Baronet and Mary Upton, and inherited his father's baronetcy in 1683. He entered Trinity College Dublin in 1670 and Lincoln's Inn in 1671. He was a devout Presbyterian and helped to found the presbyterian general fund in 1710.

Between 1692 and 1693, Langford represented Duleek in the Irish House of Commons. He was subsequently elected to represent Coleraine from 1695 to 1713 and County Antrim between 1715 and his death in 1716. He was succeeded in his title by his brother, Henry Langford.

Parliament of Ireland
Preceded by Seat not represented in Patriot Parliament	Member of Parliament for Duleek; 1692-1693; With: Andrew Ram	Succeeded by Sir Charles Feilding; Andrew Ram
Preceded by John Davys; William Leslie	Member of Parliament for Coleraine; 1695-1713; With: Samuel Jackson (1695-1703); Thomas Pearce (1703-1713)	Succeeded by Frederick Hamilton; George Lowther
Preceded by Clotworthy Skeffington; Clotworthy Upton	Member of Parliament for County Antrim; 1715-1716; With: Clotworthy Upton	Succeeded by Frederick Hamilton; Clotworthy Upton
Baronetage of Ireland
Preceded by Hercules Langford	Baronet (of Kilmackevett); 1683-1716	Succeeded by Henry Langford
