= William Beresford, 3rd Baron Decies =

Anglo-Irish soldier and peer

The Right Honourable The Lord Decies
- Born: William Robert John Horsley Beresford; June 1811
- Died: 3 July 1893 (aged 82); Bolam House, Northumberland
- Spouse: Catharine Anne Dent (m. 1860)
- Children: Caroline Catherine; Louisa; William Marcus de la Poer; John Graham Hope Horsley de la Poer; Seton Robert de la Poer; Catherine Elizabeth Ellen; Charlotte Ernestine; Henry William Walter; William Arthur de la Poer
- Parent(s): John Beresford, 2nd Baron Decies; Charlotte Philadelphia Horsley

William Robert John Horsley Beresford, 3rd Baron Decies (June 1811 – 3 July 1893) was an Anglo-Irish soldier and peer.

== Early life ==
Beresford was the only son born to John Beresford, 2nd Baron Decies, the Rector of Tuam, and Charlotte Philadelphia Horsley (only daughter and heiress of Robert Horsley of Bolam House, Northumberland. Among his siblings were Louisa Elizabeth Horsley Beresford (wife of Ernest Brudenell-Bruce, 3rd Marquess of Ailesbury) and Caroline Agnes Horsley Beresford (wife of James Graham, 4th Duke of Montrose).

His paternal grandparents were William Beresford, 1st Baron Decies, Archbishop of Tuam, and the former Elizabeth FitzGibbon (sister of John FitzGibbon, 1st Earl of Clare). His grandfather was the third son of Marcus Beresford, 1st Earl of Tyrone and Lady Catharine Power (only daughter of James Power, 3rd Earl of Tyrone and 3rd Viscount Decies).

== Career ==
Upon his father's death on 1 March 1865, he succeeded as the 3rd Baron Decies. He served as a captain in the 10th Hussars and Grenadier Guards. He also served as an Irish representative peer.

"His lordship took no active part in public affairs, but was an enlightened agriculturalist, and took a warm interest in the development of the Bolam estate, which under his personal direction, has become one of the richest, from an agricultural point of view, in the country."

== Personal life ==
On 31 July 1860, Horsley Beresford was married to Catharine Anne Dent (died 1941), the second daughter of Cmdr. William Dent of Shortflatt Tower and the former Ellen Mary Kerr (a daughter of Andrew Seton Kerr). Together, they were the parents of:

- Hon. Caroline Catherine Horsley-Beresford (1861–1929), who married Col. George Alexander Eason Wilkinson of Middlethorpe Hall and Dringhouse Manor, in 1886.
- Hon. Louisa Horsley-Beresford (1863–1866), who died young.
- William Marcus de la Poer Horsley Beresford, 4th Baron Decies (1865–1910), who married Maria Gertrude Willoughby, a daughter of Sir John Willoughby, 4th Baronet, and sister to Maj. Sir John Willoughby, Bt.
- John Graham Hope Horsley de la Poer Beresford, 5th Baron Decies (1866–1944), aide-de-camp to the Prince Arthur, Duke of Connaught who married Helen Vivien Gould, a daughter of railroad executive George Jay Gould I, in 1911. After her death in 1931, he married Elizabeth Wharton Drexel (widow of Harry Lehr) in 1936.
- Hon. Seton Robert de la Poer Horsley Beresford (1868–1928), who married actress Delia Dorothy O'Sullivan, a daughter of Daniel John O'Sullivan, in 1899. (Note: After their divorce, Delia Dorothy (née O'Sullivan) (1876–1966) married Sir Charles Huntington, 3rd Baronet and Sir Edward Lucas, 3rd Baronet.) They divorced in 1909 and he married Joan Rosemary Graves-Sawle, eldest daughter and coheiress of Rear Admiral Sir Charles John Graves-Sawle, 4th Baronet, in 1915. (Note: After his 1928 death, his widow married Col. Ralph Patterson Cobbold, a writer.)
- Hon. Catherine Elizabeth Ellen Horsley Beresford (1870–1948), who married Lt.-Col. Edward J. M. Lumb, in 1902.
- Hon. Charlotte Ernestine Horsley-Beresford (1871–1923), who married Maj. Cameron Barclay, fourth son of Henry Ford Barclay (and brother to Charles Barclay and Sir George Barclay), in 1892.
- Hon. Henry William Walter Horsley Beresford (1876–1924), who married Constance (née Blades) Levenston- better known as the actress Kitty Gordon and newly widowed of theatre manager Michael Levenston- in October 1904.
- Hon. William Arthur de la Poer Horsley Beresford (1878–1949), who married Florence Miller, a daughter of Gardner L. Miller, in 1901. They divorced in 1919 and he married Laura Coventry, eldest daughter of Capt. St John Halford Coventry, in 1919. They divorced in 1928 and he married oil heiress Georgina Leonora (née Mosselmans) de Saurigny, (Note: Dutch-born Georgina Leonora Mosselmans (1900–1969) was the former wife of Barnard; Lord Sholto George Douglas (younger son of John Douglas, 9th Marquess of Queensberry); HIH Prince Mehmed Burhameddin of Turkey (son of Sultan Abdul Hamid II); Count Ferdinand de Saurigny).) only daughter of Richard Frederick Hendrick Mosselmans, in 1933. They divorced in 1940 and he married Ida Kaye in 1941.

Lord Decies died on 3 July 1893 at Bolam House, Northumberland. After his death, Lady Decies, who survived him almost fifty years until her death on 27 February 1941, lived at Heworth Hall in York.

=== Sporting interests ===
"Like all the Beresfords, Lord Decies was a supporter and admirer of true English sports and pastimes. Of late years the penalties of ripened age prevented him taking an active part in those field sports for which when a captain in the Grenadier Guards he was distinguished, his light, spare figure giving him an advantage in the hunting field, and which in his younger days brought him into distinction as one of the best men to hounds of his time. Of a retiring disposition, he was deemed of eccentric habits, and perhaps this character was justifiable, particularly in his affection for the old style of dress. But beneath the resreved exterior there was a warm, kindly heart, and marked traits of the English nobleman. In the palmy days of the Newcastle Wrestling Society, his figure was conspicuous in the pavilion, and no spectator was better versed or took a keener interest in the mysteries of the inside and outside 'click' or the 'cross buttock,' as illustrated in manly rivalry by the sturdy athletes of the northern counties as the famous sports and border games annually celebrated at the Forth Banks."

Peerage of Ireland
Preceded by John Horsley-Beresford	Baron Decies; 1855–1893	Succeeded by William Marcus de la Poer; Horsley-Beresford
