= Shaftoe Crags Settlement =

Archeological site of Romano-British origin

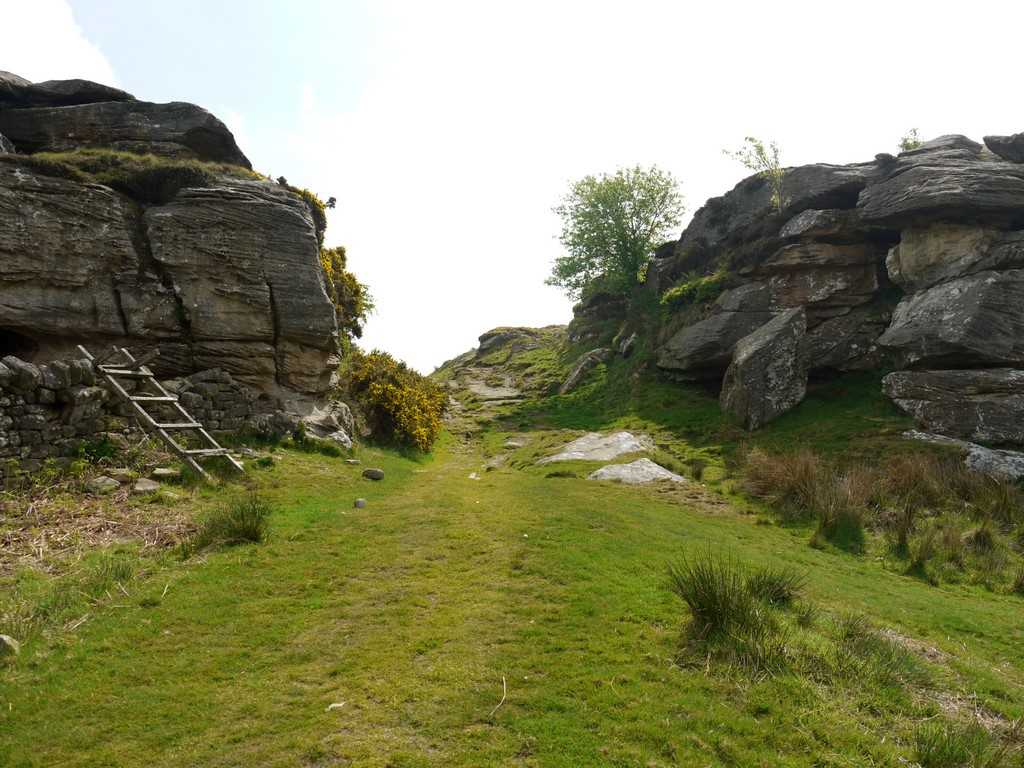
- Salters Nick, running through Shaftoe Crags, viewed from the north-west. The remains of the Iron Age and Romano-British settlement are on the right, above the crags.

- Location within Northumberland
- 55°8′8.160″N 1°55′2.100″W
- Type: Defended settlement
- Periods: Iron Age; Romano-British
- OS grid reference: NZ 054 824

Scheduled monument
- Designated: 17 March 1995
- Reference no.: 1013757

Shaftoe Crags Settlement is an archaeological site in Northumberland, England, about 8 miles (13 km) west of Morpeth. The site at Shaftoe Crags, with remains dating from the Iron Age and Romano-British periods, is a scheduled monument.

== Background ==
In Cumbria and Northumberland, native settlements regarded as dating from the Roman period have been found: such a site typically has one or more stone roundhouses at the back of an enclosure, opposite a single entrance, with small enclosed yards within the enclosure.

An earlier type of defended settlement began to be constructed during the 7th to 5th centuries BC, in the northern uplands of what is now England, sometimes located on hilltops. Within the enclosure there would be a number of stone or timber roundhouses for the inhabitants, probably a single family group, and perhaps space to keep livestock in winter.

== Description ==
There is a curving rampart of stone and earth, about 7 metres (23 ft) wide and up to 1 metre (3 ft 3 in) high, running south-east from Salters Nick. It forms, with natural defences of crags to the south, west and north, an enclosure of irregular shape, about 70 metres (230 ft) north-east to south-west and 48 metres (157 ft) north-west to south-east. This is a native defended settlement of the Roman period. Inside the enclosure are the remains of three or more stone roundhouses, diameter about 9 metres (30 ft).

There are indications of an enclosing rampart of an earlier Iron Age settlement, within which the Romano-British settlement was built. Any roundhouses from this period are obscured by the later buildings.

== Archaeological sites nearby ==
- Huckhoe Settlement, an Iron Age and Romano-British defended settlement
- The Poind and his Man, a Bronze Age burial mound
- Slate Hill Settlement, an Iron Age defended settlement
