= Sir Hercules Langford, 1st Baronet =

Anglo-Irish baronet, merchant and landowner

Sir Hercules Langford, 1st Baronet (1626 – 1683) was an Anglo-Irish baronet, merchant and landowner.

Langford was appointed High Sheriff of Antrim in 1661 and was High Sheriff of Meath in 1677. A devout Presbyterian, Langford was removed from the Commission of the Peace in Meath in the wake of Colonel Blood's plot to seize Dublin Castle. His estate was a centre of presbyterian worship, with a minister and a meeting-house supported by the family. On 19 August 1667 he was created a baronet, of Kilmackevett in the Baronetage of Ireland.

He married Mary Upton, a daughter of Henry Upton of Castle Upton, County Antrim.

Their sons were Arthur Langford and Henry Langford, both members of the Irish House of Commons, and Theophilus Langford.

One of their daughters, Mary, married Sir John Rowley and their children included Hercules Rowley.

Baronetage of Ireland
| New creation | Baronet (of Kilmackevett); 1667-1683 | Succeeded by Arthur Langford |
