= Marcus Beresford =

Marcus Beresford may refer to:

- Marcus Beresford, 1st Earl of Tyrone (1694–1763), Irish MP for Coleraine
- Marcus Beresford (Dungarvan MP) (1764–1797), Irish MP for Dungarvan, grandson of the above
- Marcus Beresford (British Army officer, born 1764) (1764–1803), British Army general and MP for St Canice and Swords, grandson of the Earl of Tyrone
- Marcus Beresford (British Army officer, born 1800) (1800–1876), British Army general and Whig MP for Northallerton and Berwick-upon-Tweed, great-grandson of the Earl of Tyrone
- Marcus Beresford (bishop) (1801–1885), Archbishop of Armagh and Primate of All Ireland, great-grandson of the Earl of Tyrone
- Marcus Beresford (Conservative politician) (1818–1890), British Conservative politician, MP for Southwark
- Lord Marcus Beresford (1848–1922), British equerry and racing manager to King Edward VII, great-great-grandson of the Earl of Tyrone
- Marcus Beresford, 7th Baron Decies (born 1948), Anglo-Irish peer, great-great-great-great-grandson of the Earl of Tyrone
