= Francis Burton (1696–1744) =

Anglo-Irish politician

Francis Burton (1 December 1696 – 20 March 1744), from Buncraggy, County Clare, Ireland, was an Anglo-Irish politician and landowner. He was a Member of Parliament for Coleraine from 1721 until 1727 and sat subsequently in the Irish House of Commons for County Clare from 1727 until his death in 1744.

== Background ==
Burton was born in Buncraggy, the son of Francis Burton (1640–1714). The senior Francis Burton in 1698 was granted some territories in Dromelihy, County Clare (previously associated with the MacGorman family and the O'Brien Viscount Clare) in the aftermath of the Williamite War in Ireland and the overthrow of James II. The Burton family were of English origin; Francis' great-grandfather Thomas Burton (born 1590) was originally from Shropshire, England.

He married the sister of Henry Conyngham, 1st Earl Conyngham. and was the father of Francis, 2nd Baron Conyngham and William Burton Conyngham. The contemporary Marquess Conyngham and Baron Londesborough families actually descend in the paternal line from Burton, despite using the surnames of Conyngham and Denison respectively.

Parliament of Ireland
Preceded by Frederick Hamilton; Sir Marcus Beresford, 4th Bt	Member of Parliament for Coleraine; 1721–1727; With: Frederick Hamilton	Succeeded by Henry Carey; Thomas Jackson
Preceded by John Ivers; George Purdon	Member of Parliament for County Clare; 1727–1744; With: Sir Edward O'Brien, 2nd Bt	Succeeded by Sir Edward O'Brien, 2nd Bt; Robert Hickman
