= George Beresford =

George Beresford may refer to:

- George Beresford, 1st Marquess of Waterford (1735–1800), Irish peer
- George Beresford (bishop) (1765–1841), Bishop of Kilmore and Ardagh, nephew of the above
- George Beresford (provost of Tuam) (died 1842), Provost of Tuam, 1816–1842, nephew of the Marquess of Waterford
- Lord George Beresford (1781–1839), British politician, son of the Marquess of Waterford
- Sir George de la Poer Beresford, 2nd Baronet (1811–1873), MP for Athlone, 1841–1842, grandson of the Marquess of Waterford
- George Beresford (Armagh MP) (1831–1906), MP for Armagh, grandson of the bishop
- George Charles Beresford (1864–1938), British studio photographer, great-grandson of the bishop

== See also ==
- Sir George Beresford Craddock (1898–1976), British Conservative politician
