= Huckhoe Settlement =

- Location within Northumberland
- 55°8′22″N 1°53′13″W
- Type: Defended settlement
- Periods: 6th century BC to 6th century AD
- Location: near Bolam
- OS grid reference: NZ 073 828

Site notes
- Excavation dates: 1955–1957

Scheduled monument
- Designated: 17 March 1995
- Reference no.: 1011838

Huckhoe Settlement is an archaeological site in Northumberland, England, near the village of Bolam and about 7 miles (11 km) west of Morpeth. The site shows occupation, in at least four phases, dating from the early Iron Age (6th century BC) to the post-Roman period (6th century AD). It is a scheduled monument.

== Description ==
The site is on an oval promontory, steep on the north and west sides, above a tributary of the River Wansbeck. There is a low earth and stone bank forming an enclosure, 94 metres (308 ft) north-east to south-west by 72 metres (236 ft) north-west to south-east, with an entrance of width 5 metres (16 ft) on the east side, and slight traces inside of roundhouses and courtyard walls. This is thought to be a re-occupation in the Romano-British period, of an Iron Age defended settlement.

The visible remains of the earlier settlement are two ramparts: the outer is 4 metres (13 ft) wide and 0.8 metres (2 ft 7 in) high on the south and east sides, with traces of an external ditch, about 10 metres (33 ft) outside the inner rampart.

=== Excavation ===
There was excavation from 1955 to 1957. Traces of a palisaded enclosure were uncovered, consisting of three concentric palisades of oak. A sample was radio-carbon dated to about 580 BC: the early Iron Age. Similar palisaded hilltop enclosures have been found in north-east England and southern Scotland; they are the earliest type of defended settlement in the area. They indicate that there was much woodland here at that time.

The excavation also found that it was probably an iron-working site during the Romano-British period, as iron slag and a probable iron-worker's hearth were found. There were also remains of rectangular buildings, interpreted as dating from the post-Roman period.

Finds from the excavation included sherds of Romano-British pottery of the 2nd to 4th century, and sherds dating to the late 5th or early 6th century.

== Archaeological sites nearby ==
- The Poind and his Man, a Bronze Age burial mound
- Shaftoe Crags Settlement, a Romano-British defended settlement
- Slate Hill Settlement, an Iron Age defended settlement
