= Bolam (surname) =

Bolam is a surname. Notable people with the surname include:

- Irene Craigmile Bolam (1904–1982), American banker
- James Bolam (born 1935), English actor
- John Bolam (1922–2009), British artist
- Ken Bolam, British film and television composer
- Margaret Dale (dancer) (1922–2010), born Margaret Elisabeth Bolam, British dancer
- Silvester Bolam (1905–1953), British newspaper editor
