= Edward J. M. Lumb =

British soldier and civil servant

Lieutenant-Colonel Edward J. M. Lumb DL JP
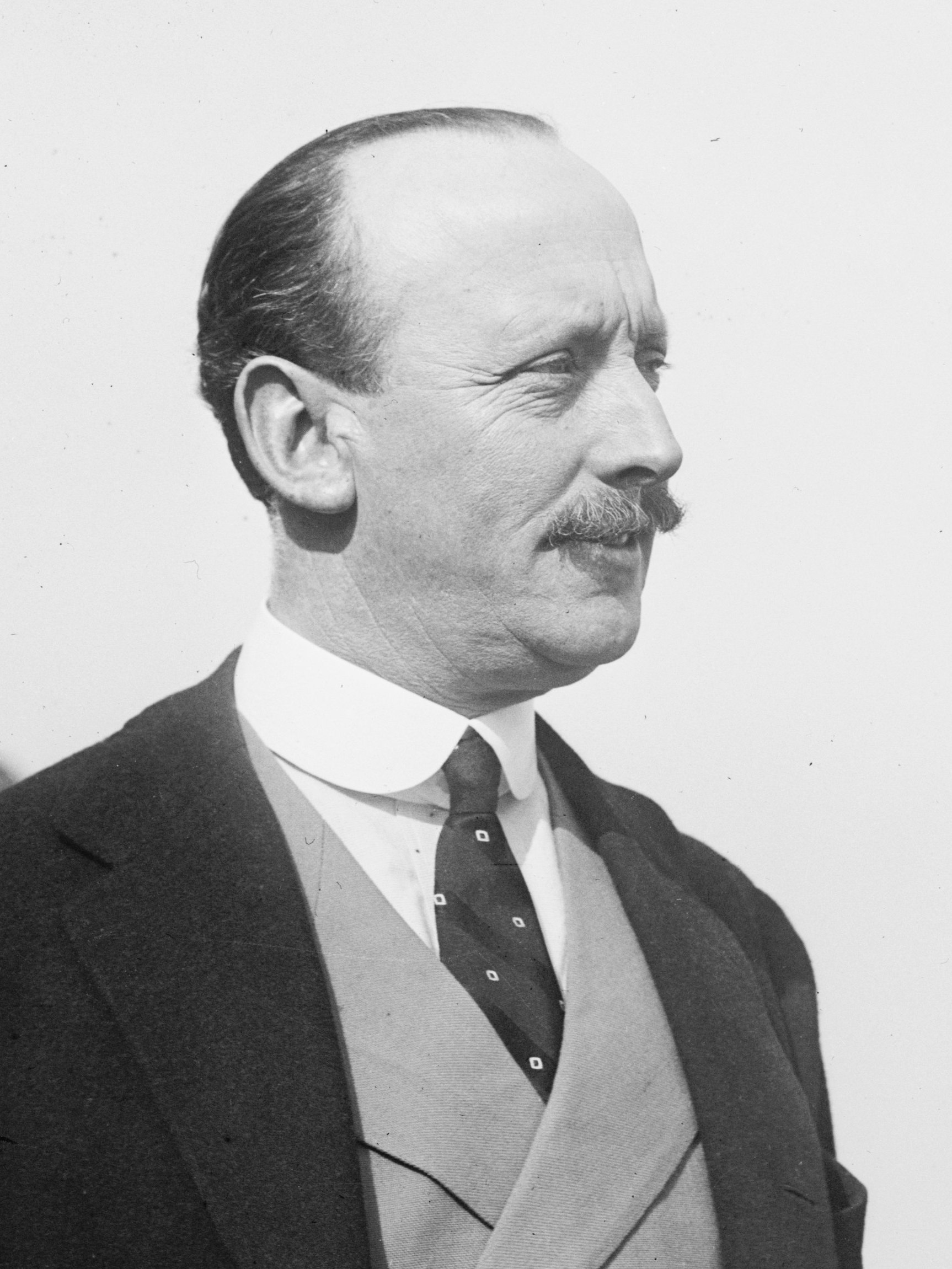
- Lumb in 1911

Personal details
- Born: Edward James Machell Lumb; 13 November 1863; Hensingham, Cumbria
- Died: 22 September 1962 (aged 98); London, England
- Spouse: Hon. Catherine Horsley-Beresford (after 1902)
- Relations: John Beresford, 5th Baron Decies (brother-in-law)
- Parent(s): James Lumb; Juliana-Georgina Harrison

Military service
- Allegiance: United Kingdom
- Branch/service: 2nd Life Guards
- Rank: Lieutenant-Colonel
- Battles/wars: World War I

Lt.-Col. Edward James Machell Lumb (13 November 1863 – 22 September 1962) was a British soldier and civil servant.

== Early life ==
Lumb was born in 1863. He was the second son of James Lumb, High Sheriff of Cumberland in 1880, and Juliana-Georgina Harrison (d. 1869). His elder brother, George Fitzmaurice Lumb, died aged 10. His younger brother was the Rev. Loftus Gerald William Lumb His two surviving sisters were Constance Harriet Elizabeth Lumb (wife of Robert Jefferson, Esq.) and Helen Juliana Lumb (wife of Maj. A. Lumb).

His father was the fourth son of Harriet (née Wilkin) Lumb and William Lumb of Brigham Hall, Cumberland. His maternal grandfather was Joseph Harrison of Linethwaite Hall, Cumberland.

== Career ==
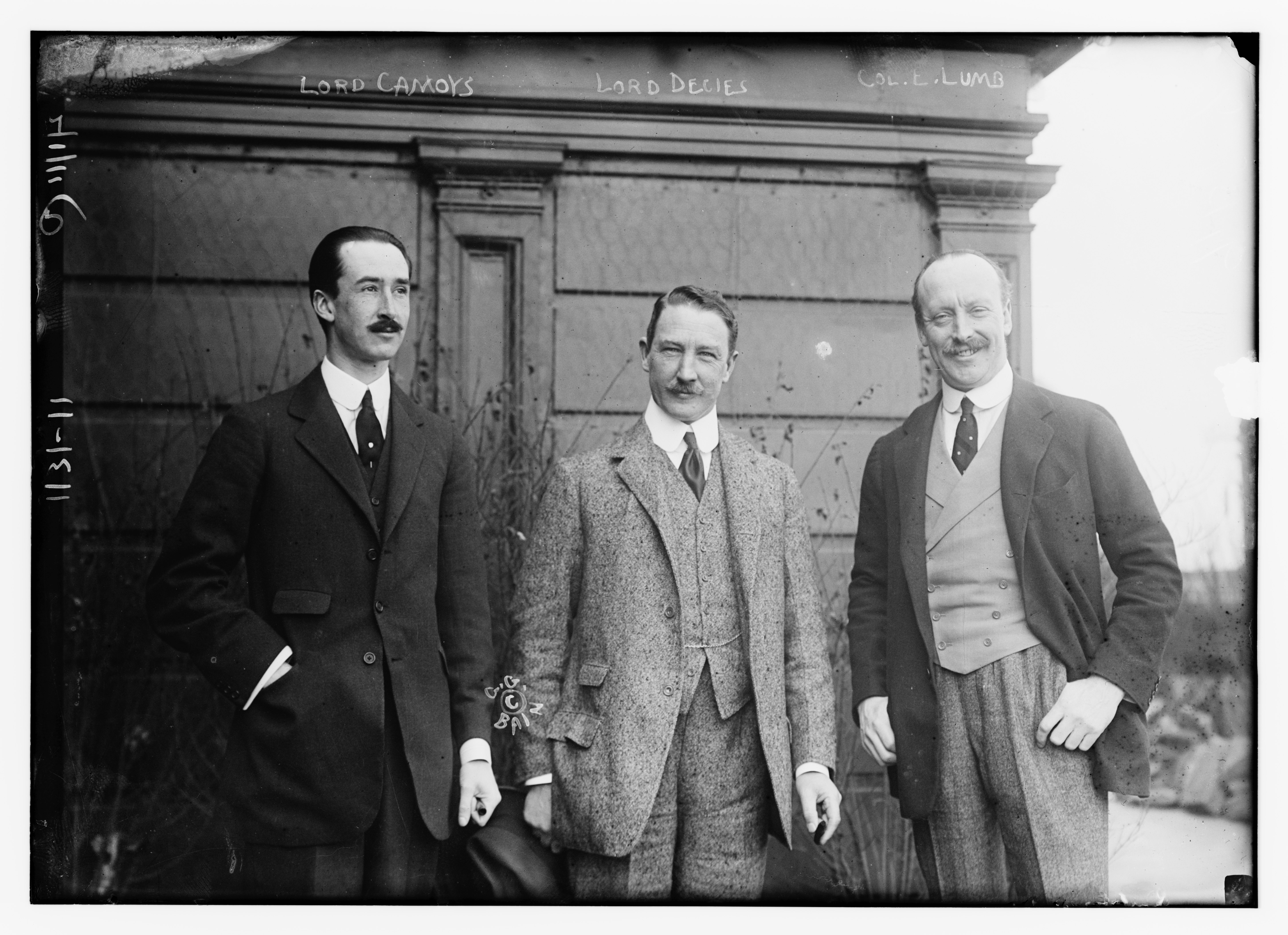
Lord Camoys, Lord Decies, Col. E. Lumb, 1911

Lumb served as a justice of the peace and Deputy Lieutenant of Cumberland. In 1903, he became a member of Lloyd's of London.

He served in the British Army, achieving the rank of Lieutenant-Colonel in the 2nd Life Guards under Sir Cecil Edward Bingham.

== Personal life ==
On 16 September 1902, Lumb was married to the Hon. Catherine Elizabeth Ellen Horsley-Beresford (1870–1948) at the Church of St Michael le Belfrey, York. She was a younger daughter of William Horsley-Beresford, 3rd Baron Decies. They lived at 4 Hereford Gardens, Park Lane West and at Homewood, Whitehaven in Cumberland. In 1911, Lumb and Lord Camoys traveled to New York aboard the Mauretania to be ushers at the wedding of Lumb's brother-in-law, John Beresford, 5th Baron Decies, to the American heiress Helen Vivien Gould. At time, Lumb and Lord Camoys were reported to have "had nothing but flattering things to say of America and American women. Both said they were enthusiastically in favor of woman's suffrage."

His wife died on 11 March 1948.
