= The Poind and his Man =

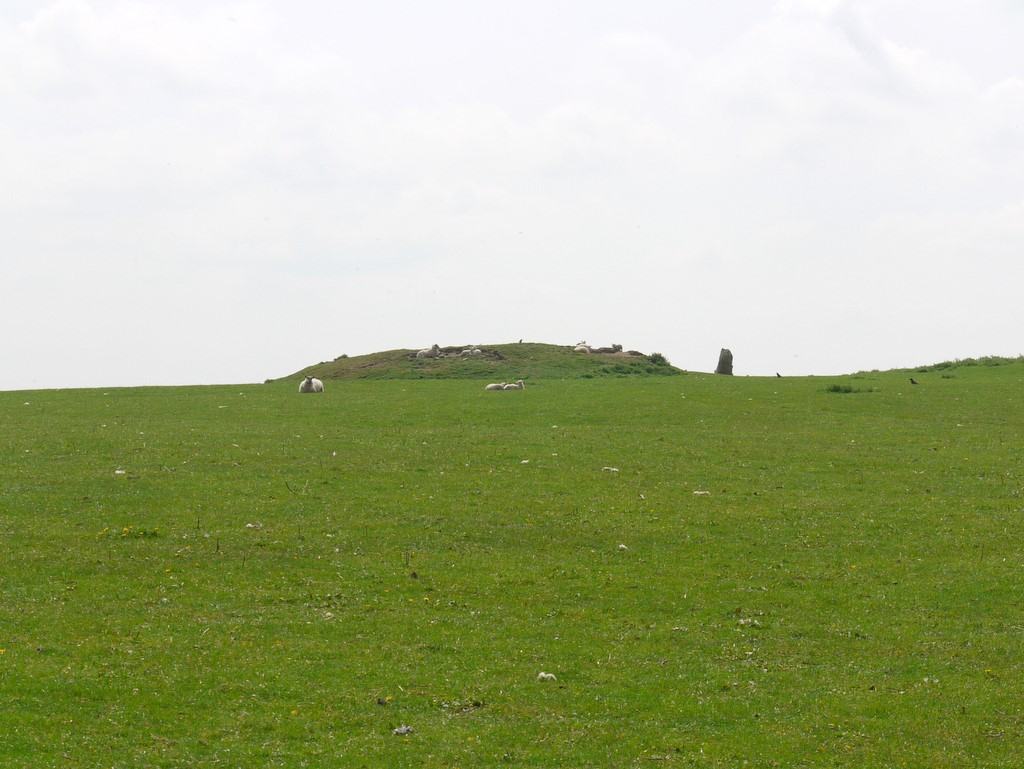
- Viewed from the north-west

- Location within Northumberland
- 55°8′0.240″N 1°53′53.916″W
- Type: Tumulus, standing stone
- Periods: Late Neolithic/ Early Bronze Age
- Location: near Bolam
- OS grid reference: NZ 066 821

Site notes
- Archaeologists: John Warburton

Scheduled monument
- Designated: 28 November 1932
- Reference no.: 1015530

The Poind and his Man is a prehistoric site in Northumberland, England, near the village of Bolam and about 7 miles (11 km) west of Morpeth. The site, consisting of a burial mound and a standing stone, is a scheduled monument.

== Description ==
The burial mound, described as a round cairn, is situated on a small knoll. It dates from the Late Neolithic to Early Bronze Age. Its diameter is 14 metres (46 ft), and it is 1.9 metres (6 ft 3 in) high.

A standing stone, height 2 metres (6 ft 7 in), is next to the mound; it was formerly one of two such stones ("the poind and his man"). The standing stone in the grounds of Wallington Hall is thought to have been moved from here in the early 18th century.

The mound was partly excavated in the 18th century by John Warburton. He found a cist near the top of the centre of the mound.

== Archaeological sites nearby ==
- Huckhoe Settlement, an Iron Age and Romano-British site
- Shaftoe Crags Settlement, a Romano-British site
- Slate Hill Settlement, an Iron Age site
