= Edward Wingfield, 2nd Viscount Powerscourt =

Irish politician

The Right Honourable The Viscount Powerscourt
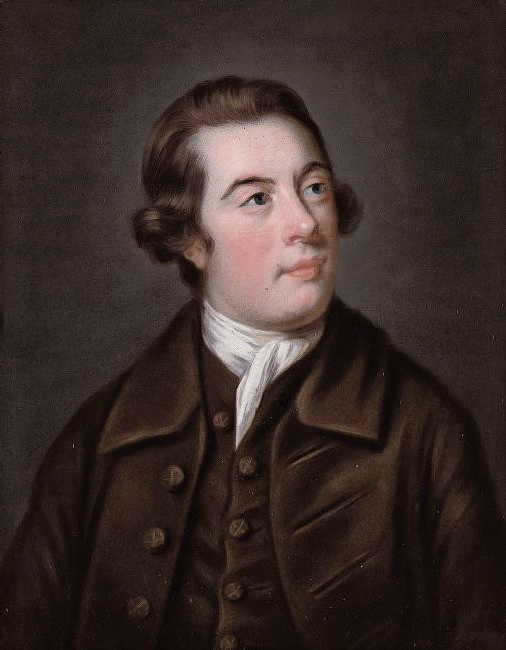
- Lord Powerscourt

Member of Parliament for Stockbridge
- In office 1756–1761

Personal details
- Born: Edward Wingfield; 23 October 1729
- Died: 6 May 1764 (aged 34)
- Parent(s): Richard Wingfield, 1st Viscount Powerscourt; Dorothy Beresford Rowley
- Relatives: Richard Wingfield, 3rd Viscount Powerscourt

Edward Wingfield, 2nd Viscount Powerscourt (23 October 1729 – 6 May 1764), styled The Honourable Edward Wingfield between 1744 and 1751, was an Anglo-Irish peer and politician.

== Biography ==
Wingfield was the son of Richard Wingfield, 1st Viscount Powerscourt and Dorothy Beresford Rowley, daughter of Hercules Rowley, of Summerhill, County Meath. he was educated at St John's College, Cambridge. He succeeded his father in the viscountcy in 1751. This was an Irish peerage and gave him a seat in the Irish House of Lords. However, he was still able to stand for election for the British House of Commons, and in 1756 he was successfully returned for Stockbridge, a seat he held until 1761.

Lord Powerscourt died unmarried in May 1764, aged 34, and was succeeded in the title by his younger brother, Richard.

Parliament of Great Britain
Preceded by John Gibbons; George Hay	Member of Parliament for Stockbridge; 1756–1761; With: John Gibbons	Succeeded by George Prescott; Nicholas Linwood
Peerage of Ireland
Preceded by Richard Wingfield	Viscount Powerscourt; 1751–1764	Succeeded by Richard Wingfield
