= Slate Hill Settlement =

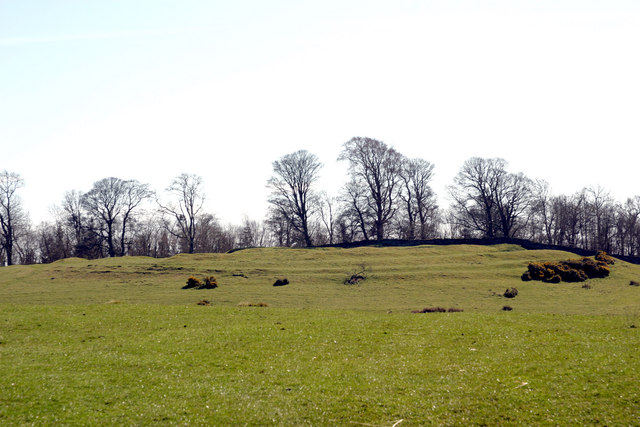
- Viewed from the north

- Location within Northumberland
- 55°8′1.68″N 1°52′47.82″W
- Type: Defended settlement
- Periods: Iron Age
- Location: near Bolam
- OS grid reference: NZ 077 822

Scheduled monument
- Designated: 20 May 1963
- Reference no.: 1011834

Slate Hill Settlement is an archaeological site in Northumberland, England, near the village of Bolam and about 7 miles (11 km) west of Morpeth. The site, a defended settlement dating from the Iron Age, is a scheduled monument.

== Description ==
The site is regarded as an example of a type of defended settlement of the Iron Age, first constructed in the 7th to 5th centuries BC in the northern uplands of what is now England, sometimes located on hilltops. Within the enclosure there would be a number of stone or timber roundhouses for the inhabitants, probably a single family group, and perhaps space to keep livestock in winter.

On Slate Hill there are four concentric ramparts, terraced on the sloping hillside, in a semicircle forming on the north and west sides of an enclosure; quarrying has affected the east side where one rampart remains. The ramparts, of stone and earth, are about 5 metres (16 ft) wide and 1.4 metres (4 ft 7 in) high. On the south side a steep slope provides defence. The enclosure within the defences is about 98 metres (322 ft) west to east and 62 metres (203 ft) north to south. A break in the west side is thought to be an original entrance.

== Archaeological sites nearby ==
- Huckhoe Settlement, an Iron Age and Romano-British settlement
- The Poind and his Man, a Bronze Age burial mound
- Shaftoe Crags Settlement, a Romano-British defended settlement
