= Bolam West Houses =

Village in Northumberland, England

Coordinates: 55.1368°N 1.8838°W

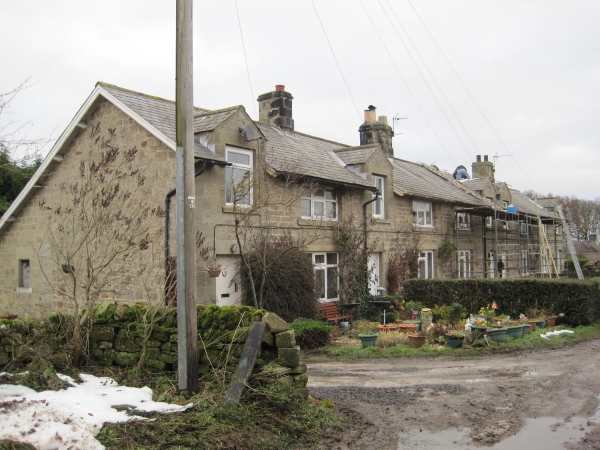

- Location within Northumberland
- OS grid reference: NZ075825
- Civil parish: Belsay
- Unitary authority: Northumberland
- Ceremonial county: Northumberland
- Region: North East
- Country: England
- Sovereign state: United Kingdom
- Post town: Morpeth
- Postcode district: NE61
- Police: Northumbria
- Fire: Northumberland
- Ambulance: North East
- UK Parliament: Berwick-upon-Tweed

Bolam West Houses is a hamlet in the civil parish of Belsay, in Northumberland, England. It is about 20 miles (32 km) to the north-west of Newcastle, close to Bolam.
