= Seton Beresford =

Irish cricketer

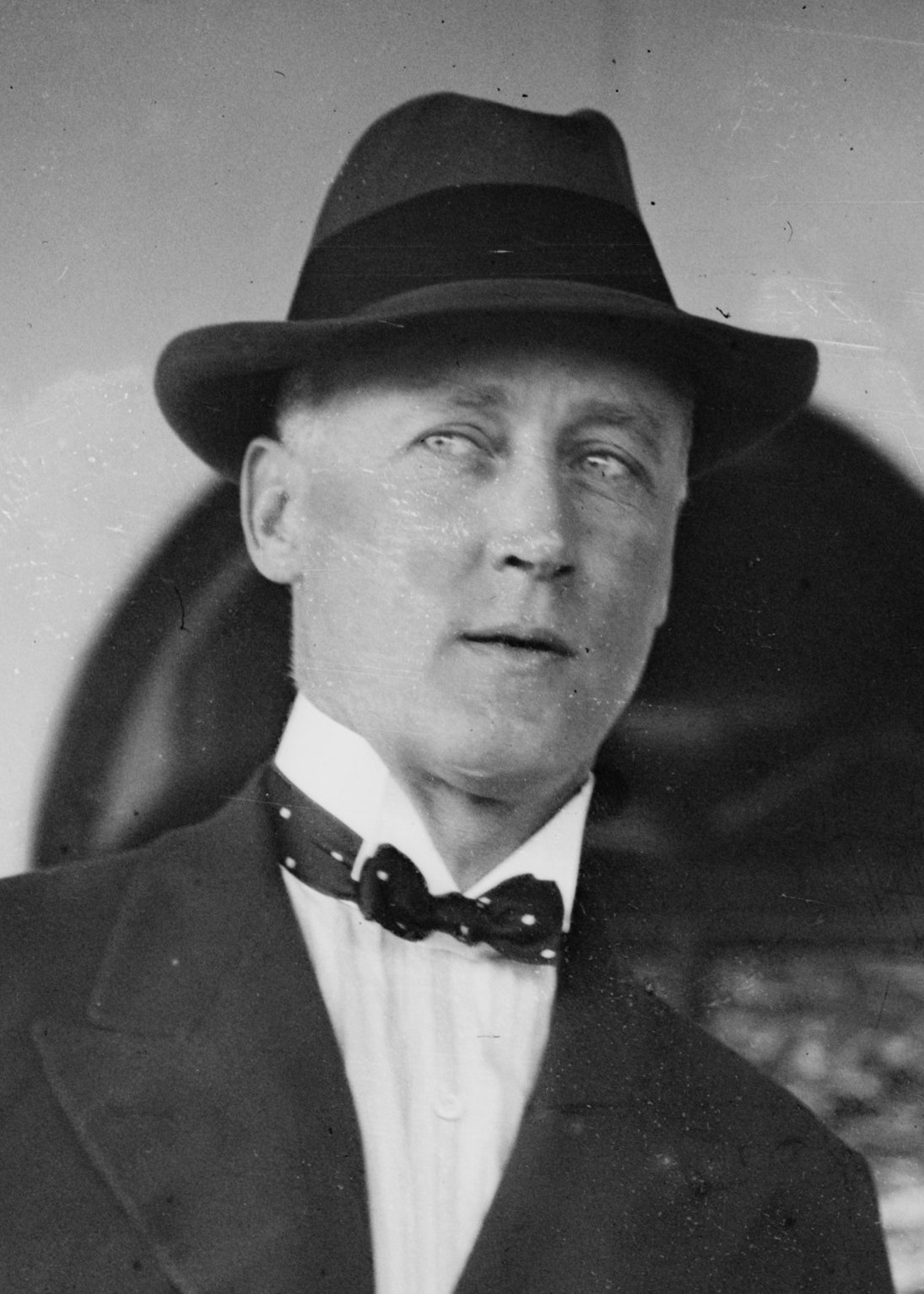
Seton Beresford

Seton Robert de la Poer Horsley Beresford (25 July 1868 – 28 May 1928) was an Irish-born first-class cricketer who played for Middlesex, the Marylebone Cricket Club (MCC) and the Gentlemen in 1909 and 1910. He was born at Leixlip, County Kildare in Ireland and died at Cap d'Ail in France.

Beresford was the third son of the third Baron Decies; his two older brothers both succeeded to the peerage. He was educated at Eton College and Magdalene College, Cambridge. In the Second Boer War he was a special correspondent and was the first man to enter Kimberley and notify Cecil Rhodes of the approach of the relief force.

As a sportsman, Beresford played in eight first-class cricket matches; earlier he had played ice hockey for the All-England team and won the world championship for trap shooting at Monte Carlo for four years from 1901.
