= Frederick Hamilton (Londonderry politician) =

Irish general and politician

Lieutenant-General The Right Honourable Frederick Hamilton PC JP

Member of Parliament for Coleraine
- In office 1713–1727 Serving with George Lowther, Sir Marcus Beresford, 4th Bt, Francis Burton
- Preceded by: Sir Arthur Langford, 2nd Bt; Thomas Pearce
- Succeeded by: Henry Carey; Thomas Jackson

Personal details
- Died: 26 March 1732
- Political party: Whig
- Spouse: Jane Beresford
- Parent(s): Archibald Hamilton; Mary Howard

Lt.-Gen. Frederick Hamilton PC JP (died 26 March 1732) was a Scottish born Irish general and politician who served in the Parliament of Ireland.

== Early life ==
Hamilton was the son of Mary (née Howard) Hamilton and Archibald Hamilton, the son of Robert Hamilton, 7th of Fairholm and of Milburne (brother to Matthew Hamilton of Milnburn), and Isobel Hamilton (a daughter of John Hamilton, 2nd of Stonehouse). His father was hanged in 1651 at Stirling, Scotland, for giving information to the English which led to the capture of Earl of Eglinton. His mother was subsequently granted reparation and the family moved to Ireland.

== Career ==
From 1677, he was captain of an independent company in Charles II's Irish army, active against tories in the district of Lough Erne. He eventually gained the rank of Lieutenant-General.

He was recognised by Lord Lyon King of Arms, and matriculated his arms at the Lyon Court between 1680 and 1687. He held the office of Whig Member of Parliament for Coleraine from 1713 to 1727 and was appointed Privy Counsellor in 1715. He also held the office of Lord Justice of Ireland.

Hamilton served as a Governor of Royal Hospital, Dublin between 1718 and 1732.

== Personal life ==
He married Jane Beresford (1665–1716), daughter of Sir Randal Beresford, 2nd Baronet, and Hon. Catherine Annesley (a daughter of Francis Annesley, 1st Viscount Valentia). Their only child, a daughter called Jane, probably died young. He resided at Walworth and had estates at Tipperary, Kildare, and County Londonderry, Ireland, and at Millburn, Scotland. In 1713 he obtained a private act of the British parliament confirming his land purchases.

He died on 26 March 1732. His heirs were his wife's nephews, Marcus Beresford, 1st Earl of Tyrone; and his brother George's grandson, Frederick Carey.

== In popular culture ==
Hamilton was said to be the inspiration for Sir Walter Scott's character Morton of Milnewood in his 1816 tale of Old Mortality.

Parliament of Ireland
Preceded by Sir Arthur Langford, 2nd Bt; Thomas Pearce	Member of Parliament for Coleraine; 1713–1727; With: George Lowther; Sir Marcus Beresford, 4th Bt; Francis Burton	Succeeded by Henry Carey; Thomas Jackson
