= William Beresford, 4th Baron Decies =

Anglo-Irish aristocrat

The Right Honourable The Lord Decies DL JP
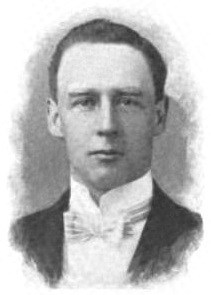
- In The Sketch, 20 March 1901
- Born: William Marcus de la Poer Horsley Beresford; 12 January 1865
- Died: 30 July 1910 (aged 45); Hornsey, London
- Education: Eton College; Christ Church, Oxford
- Spouse: Maria Gertrude Willoughby (m. 1901)
- Parent(s): William Beresford, 3rd Baron Decies; Catherine Anne Dent

William Marcus de la Poer Horsley Beresford, 4th Baron Decies DL JP (12 January 1865 – 30 July 1910) was an Anglo-Irish aristocrat.

== Early life ==
Beresford was born on 12 January 1865. He was the eldest of five sons born to William Horsley Beresford, 3rd Baron Decies, a Captain in the 10th Hussars and Grenadier Guards, and Catherine Anne Dent, daughter of Commander William Dent. His paternal grandparents were John Horsley-Beresford, 2nd Baron Decies and the former Charlotte Philadelphia Horsley (only daughter and heiress of Robert Horsley of Bolam House).

He was educated at Eton and Christ Church, Oxford.

== Career ==
Upon his father's death on 3 July 1893, he succeeded as the 4th Baron Decies. He served as Deputy Lieutenant of Northumberland and Justice of the Peace for Northumberland.

A "well-known and popular sportsman," he had an interest in hunting and "all outdoor sports." At the time of his death he had several horses in training with Pickering at Newmarket and with Major Morris at Wallingford.

== Personal life ==
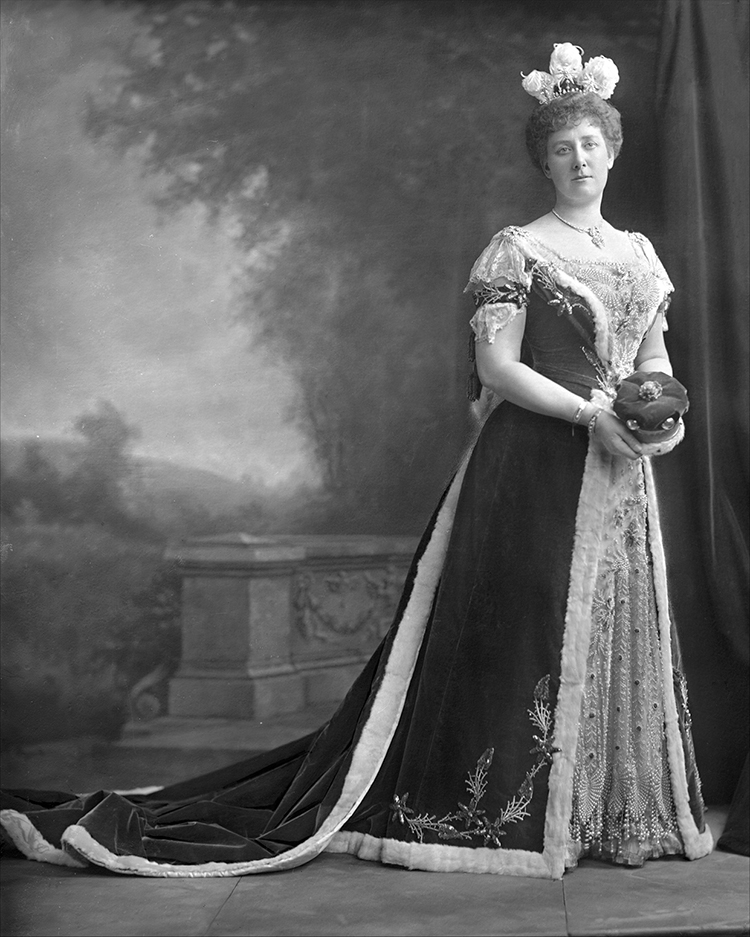
Photograph of his wife, Maria Gertrude Willoughby, at the State opening of Parliament, 17 February 1903

On 12 March 1901, Lord Decies was married to Maria Gertrude Willoughby at St Michael's Church in Chester Square (in the Belgravia district of West London). As Maria's father, Sir John Willoughby, 4th Baronet, had died in 1866, her brother, Maj. Sir John Willoughby, Bt of Jameson Raid fame, gave her away and William's groomsman was his brother, Capt. the Hon. John Graham Beresford, aide-de-camp to the Prince Arthur, Duke of Connaught. She was known for her "remarkable collection of cats."

Lord Decies died, suddenly, on 30 July 1910, aged 45, at the Cottage Hospital in Hornsey, after having been "overcome by the oppressive heat" while attending the races at Alexandra Park. As he died without issue, he was succeeded in the barony by his younger brother, John.

Peerage of Ireland
Preceded by William Horsley-Beresford	Baron Decies; 1893–1910	Succeeded by John Graham Hope Horsley de la Poer Beresford
