= Folliott Wingfield, 1st Viscount Powerscourt =

Anglo-Irish politician and peer

Folliott Wingfield, 1st Viscount Powerscourt (2 November 1642 – c. 5 February 1717), was an Anglo-Irish politician and peer.

== Biography ==
He was the son of Richard Wingfield and Elizabeth Folliott, a daughter of Henry Folliott, 1st Baron Folliott and Anne Strode. William Ponsonby, 1st Viscount Duncannon, was his younger half-brother.

Wingfield served in the Irish House of Commons as the Member of Parliament for County Wicklow between 1661 and 1665. On 22 February 1665, he was raised to the Peerage of Ireland as Viscount Powerscourt and assumed his seat in the Irish House of Lords.

He married Lady Elizabeth Boyle, daughter of Roger Boyle, 1st Earl of Orrery, and Lady Margaret Howard, in September 1660. Upon his death his titles became extinct. A descendant of his uncle was created Viscount Powerscourt in 1743 to revive the title.

Parliament of Ireland
Preceded by Richard Chapel Whaley; Anthony Brabazon	Member of Parliament for County Wicklow; 1661–1665; With: Ralph Howard	Succeeded by Ralph Howard; William Brabazon
Peerage of Ireland
New creation	Viscount Powerscourt; 2nd creation 1665–1717	Extinct
