= George Beresford (provost of Tuam) =

Provost of Tuam, County Galway, Ireland

George de la Poer Beresford was Provost of Tuam from 1816 until his death at Bundoran in September 1842: the revenue was then suspended by the Lord Lieutenant of Ireland and the Privy Council of Ireland.
