= Beresford Potter =

Beresford Potter FRGS (1853–10 May 1931) was Archdeacon in Cyprus and Syria from 1901 to 1928.

He also served as Chaplain, St Paul's English Church (now St Paul's Anglican Cathedral) in Nicosia.

The son of Dr Samuel George Potter, he was born in Stratford on Slaney in Ireland in 1853. He graduated from Trinity College, Dublin with first-class honours in 1875.

== Arms ==
Coat of arms of Beresford Potter
Notes Confirmed 8 July 1921 by George Dames Burtchaell, Athlone Pursuivant and Deputy Ulster King of Arms. Crest On a wreath of the colours a seahorse Or charged on the breast with a cinquefoil Gules. Escutcheon Sable a fess vairy Or and Gules cottised Argent between three cinquefoils of the second. Motto Re E Merito
