= C. R. Beresford =

Journalist (1888–1945)

Claude Richard Beresford also known as Claude Richard de la Poer Beresford (9 March 1888 – 19 September 1945) was a journalist in South Australia. He wrote more than 2,000 pieces of topical verse for The News and The Mail under the pen name "Seebee".

== History ==
Beresford was a son of Richard de la Poer Beresford, a descendant of an old Irish family, and Sydney Julia Beresford, née Acraman, of Barton Terrace, North Adelaide.

He was wharf manager at Port Adelaide for the Melbourne Steamship Co., and in his spare moments wrote verse and topical pieces for the Adelaide press.

In 1923 he joined the staff of News Ltd., and remained with the company for 22 years, writing many articles on shipping and the early history of the colony, of which he was a recognised authority.

Though not a sea traveller, he amassed a valuable collection of paintings of sailing ships.

== Family ==
Beresford married Marion Beaven ( – ) in 1915; their family included:

- Sydney May Beresford (1917 ) married Leonard Arthur Ranson Evans on 23 September 1937
- (Molly) Clodagh Beresford (1920 – ) married Lieut. Harold de Vall Amphlett of Victoria, British Columbia on 23 December 1940.
- Ben R(ichard) Beresford (1927 – ) married Janet Marcia Grime
- Donald Charles Beresford (1933 – )

They had a home at Martin Avenue, Fitzroy. Each of the children was also known as "de la Poer Beresford".
