= County Wicklow (Parliament of Ireland constituency) =

Pre-1801 Irish constituency

- Former county constituency for the Irish House of Commons
- County: County Wicklow

–1801
- Seats: 2
- Replaced by: County Wicklow (UKHC)

County Wicklow was a constituency represented in the Irish House of Commons until 1800.

== Members of Parliament ==
- 1585: Sir Henry Harrington and Edward Brabazon, later 1st Baron Ardee
- 1613–1614: Phelim MacFeagh Byrne and Gerald Byrne
- 1634–1635: Sir Robert Talbot, 2nd Baronet and __ Byrne
- 1639–1649: Sir William Parsons and Sir William Ussher
- 1661–1666: Folliott Wingfield (replaced by Edward Brabazon in 1666) and Abraham Yarner

=== 1689–1801 ===
Election	First MP	Second MP
1689	Richard Butler	William Talbot
1692	John Price	Robert Stratford
1695	John Price	Richard Edwards
1703	William Whitshed	Richard Edwards
1713	William Whitshed	John Allen
1715	Henry Percy	Robert Allen
1725	William Hoey	Robert Allen
1742	William Hoey	John Allen
1745	William Hoey	Anthony Brabazon
1747	Richard Chapel Whaley	Anthony Brabazon
1761	Ralph Howard	Hon. Richard Wingfield
1765	Ralph Howard	William Brabazon
1776	Hon. John Stratford	William Brabazon
1783	Hon. John Stratford	Nicholas Westby
1790	William Hume	Nicholas Westby
1799	William Hoare Hume	Nicholas Westby
1801	Replaced by Westminster constituency County Wicklow	
