= Lucy Beresford =

British writer, psychotherapist and media commentator

Lucy Beresford is an English broadcaster, presenter, novelist, and psychotherapist.

== Biography ==
Beresford has an M.A. in psychotherapy awarded by the City University, London, and an Advanced Diploma in Integrative Psychotherapy, having studied for both at Regent's College School of Psychotherapy and Counselling Psychology, London. She is registered with the United Kingdom Council for Psychotherapy (UKCP). She sees patients for the Priory Hospital, Roehampton, and privately in central London. She also has a degree in English literature from the University of Durham and was a member of the Durham Revue sketch comedy group, The Durham Revue.

Beresford’s initial career was in finance, with Shearson Lehman Brothers and BZW.

She was the agony aunt for Healthy magazine and, before that, for 5 years at Psychologies. Beresford is also an agony aunt on ITV's This Morning, hosts "Love Decoded" for eHarmony, and is LBC's 'naughty Mary Poppins' having hosted their weekly 'Sex & Relationships' phone-in show since 2015. She blogs for Huffington Post UK Lifestyle and was shortlisted for "Dating Expert of the Year 2015" by the UK Dating Awards. She is in the Faculty of The School of Life and is a Fellow of the RSA. She reviews contemporary fiction for a variety of British publications including The Spectator, the New Statesman, The Literary Review and The Sunday Telegraph.

Beresford appears frequently in international media, forwarding her views on state-enforced medication and recommending incentivization by punishment. Her appearances include the Jeremy Vine Show on BBC Radio 2, CNN, Daily Politics on BBC2, BBC Breakfast on BBC1, This Morning on ITV, NewsTalk on Channel 5, and Woman's Hour and the Today programme on BBC Radio 4.

== Bibliography ==
Title	Year published	Genre
Something I'm Not	2008	Fiction
Happy Relationships at Home, Work & Play	2013	Non-fiction
Invisible Threads	2015	Fiction
Hungry for Love	2016	Fiction
