= Richard Wingfield, 3rd Viscount Powerscourt =

Anglo-Irish politician and peer

The Right Honourable Viscount Powerscourt

Member of Parliament for Wicklow
- In office 1761–1764

Personal details
- Born: Richard Wingfield; 24 December 1730
- Died: 8 August 1788 (aged 57)
- Spouse: Lady Amelia Stratford (m. 1760, died)
- Children: 2
- Parent(s): Richard Wingfield, 1st Viscount Powerscourt; Dorothy Beresford Rowley

Richard Wingfield, 3rd Viscount Powerscourt (24 December 1730 – 8 August 1788) was an Anglo-Irish politician and peer.

== Biography ==
Powerscourt was a younger son of Richard Wingfield, 1st Viscount Powerscourt and Dorothy Beresford Rowley. He was educated at Trinity College Dublin and was admitted to the Middle Temple in 1746. He served in the Irish House of Commons as the Member of Parliament for County Wicklow from 1761 to 1764. That year he succeeded his brother, Edward Wingfield, 2nd Viscount Powerscourt, in his titles and assumed his seat in the Irish House of Lords.

He lived in Powerscourt House, Dublin.

He married Lady Amelia Stratford, daughter of John Stratford, 1st Earl of Aldborough and Martha O'Neale, on 7 September 1760. Powerscourt was succeeded by his eldest son, Richard.

Parliament of Ireland
Preceded by Richard Chapel Whaley; Anthony Brabazon	Member of Parliament for County Wicklow; 1761 – 1764; With: Ralph Howard	Succeeded by Ralph Howard; William Brabazon
Peerage of Ireland
Preceded by Edward Wingfield	Viscount Powerscourt; 1764–1788	Succeeded by Richard Wingfield
