= County Londonderry (Parliament of Ireland constituency) =

Pre-1801 Irish constituency

Coordinates: 54.922°N 6.953°W

- Former county constituency for the Irish House of Commons
- County: County Londonderry

–1801
- Seats: 2
- Replaced by: Londonderry County (UKHC)

County Londonderry was a constituency represented in the Irish House of Commons until 1800.

== Members of Parliament ==
- 1613–1615: John Baker and John Rowley
- 1634–1635: Tristram Beresford and George Cary
- 1639–1649: Henry Conway and Edward Rowley
- 1656–1658 (Second Protectorate Parliament): Tristram Beresford and Thomas Newburgh
- 1661–1666: (Sir) Tristram Beresford and Sir John Rowley

=== 1692–1801 ===
| Election | First MP | | Second MP |
|---|---|---|---|
| 1692 | Sir Tristram Beresford, 3rd Bt | | George Philips |
| 1697 | Sir Tristram Beresford, 3rd Bt | | James Lenox |
| 1697 | Sir Tristram Beresford, 3rd Bt | | William Jackson |
| 1703 | William Conolly | Whig | Hercules Rowley |
| 1729 | Arthur Dawson | | Hercules Rowley |
| 1742 | Edward Cary | | Hercules Rowley |
| 1743 | Edward Cary | | Hercules Langford Rowley |
| 1761 | Edward Cary | | Thomas Conolly |
| 1790 | Henry Beresford, Earl of Tyrone | | Thomas Conolly |
| 1800 | Henry Beresford, Earl of Tyrone | | Hon. Charles William Stewart |
| 1801 | Replaced by Westminster constituency of Londonderry County | | |
