= Sir Tristram Beresford, 3rd Baronet =

Anglo-Irish soldier, politician and baronet

The Right Honourable Sir Tristram Beresford

Member of Parliament for County Londonderry
- In office 1692–1699
- Preceded by: Patriot Parliament
- Succeeded by: William Conolly; Hercules Rowley

Personal details
- Born: 1669
- Died: 16 June 1701 (aged 31–32)
- Spouse: Hon. Nichola Sophia Hamilton (after 1687)
- Parent(s): Sir Randal Beresford, 2nd Baronet; Hon. Catherine Annesley

Sir Tristram Beresford, 3rd Baronet (1669 – 16 June 1701) was an Anglo-Irish soldier, politician and baronet.

== Early life ==
He was the second, but oldest surviving son of Sir Randal Beresford, 2nd Baronet and the Hon. Catherine Annesley. Among his siblings were two sisters, Catherine Beresford (wife of Matthew Pennefather), and Jane Beresford (wife of Lt.-Gen. Frederick Hamilton).

His paternal grandparents were Sir Tristram Beresford, 1st Baronet, and Anne Rowley (a daughter of John Rowley of Castle Rose). His maternal grandparents were Francis Annesley, 1st Viscount Valentia and, his second wife, the former Jane Stanhope (a daughter of Sir John Stanhope).

In 1681, he succeeded his father as baronet.

== Career ==
Commanding a Protestant regiment, Beresford was attainted by King James II of England in May 1689. However he was acquitted after the Glorious Revolution. He entered the Irish House of Commons in 1692, sitting for County Londonderry until 1699.

== Personal life ==
In February 1687, he married Hon. Nichola Sophia Hamilton, youngest daughter of Hugh Hamilton, 1st Viscount of Glenawly, who spent most of his career in the Swedish army, and his second wife Susanna Balfour. Together, they were the parents of four daughters and a son, including:

- Susanna Catherina Beresford (c. 1689–1763), who married Hyacinth Nugent, 2nd Baron Nugent, son of Thomas Nugent, 1st Baron Nugent of Riverston, in 1703.
- Arabella Maria Beresford (1690–1732)
- Jane Beresford (c. 1692–1764), who married prominent County Meath politician Gorges Lowther, in c. 1711.
- Marcus Beresford, 1st Earl of Tyrone (1694–1763), who married Lady Catherine Power, only daughter of James Power, 3rd Earl of Tyrone, in 1717.
- Araminta Beresford (1695–c. 1729)

His wife grew up with John Power, 2nd Earl of Tyrone. According to a family legend they both agreed in their childhood, that whoever should die at first, should try to return and report to the other about the afterlife. In October 1693, Nichola wore one morning a black ribbon and after a request by her husband, declared that her friend had died. Shortly thereafter a letter from the earl's steward arrived, confirming her assertion. She also predicted Beresford the birth of his son and when in 1713, a clergyman presented her documents, which changed her age to forty-seven, she announced her oncoming death. Nichola told a female friend, that on the night after the earl's death, his ghost had manifested and had given her information about her future life.

Sir Tristram died in 1701 and was succeeded in the baronetcy by his son Marcus, later raised to the Peerage of Ireland by the title Earl of Tyrone. After his death, Lady Beresford remarried, to Gen. Richard Gorges of Kilbrew, County Meath, and had a further six children. Despite the romantic family legend, her death in 1713 was probably in childbirth with her youngest daughter Lucy, who married firstly William St Lawrence, 14th Baron Howth, by whom she had several children, and secondly Nicholas Weldon. Gen. Gorges remarried Dorothy Stopford ("Countess Doll"), daughter of James Stopford and Mary Forth, and widow of Edward Brabazon, fourth Earl of Meath.

=== Descendants ===
Through his daughter Jane, he was a grandfather of Gorges Lowther, Irish MP for Ratoath and County Meath, and Sir Marcus Lowther-Crofton, 1st Baronet, whose descendants hold the title Baron Crofton.

Through his only son Marcus, he was a grandfather of George Beresford, 1st Marquess of Waterford, John Beresford, MP for Waterford, William Beresford, 1st Baron Decies, Lady Catherine Beresford (wife of Thomas Christmas MP, and Theophilus Jones, MP), Lady Anne Beresford (wife of William Annesley, 1st Viscount Glerawly), Lady Jane Beresford (wife of Edward Cary MP), Lady Araminta Beresford (wife of George Paul Monck, MP), Lady Frances Maria Beresford (wife of Henry Flood, MP), and Lady Eliza Beresford (wife of Col. Thomas Cobbe).

Parliament of Ireland
Preceded by Patriot Parliament	Member of Parliament for County Londonderry; 1692–1699; With: George Philips 1692–1697; James Lenox 1697; William Jackson 1697–1699	Succeeded by William Conolly; Hercules Rowley
Baronetage of Ireland
Preceded by Randal Beresford	Baronet (of Coleraine); 1681–1701	Succeeded by Marcus Beresford
