= Sir Henry Langford, 3rd Baronet =

Irish politician

Sir Henry Langford, 3rd Baronet (circa 1655 – 1725) was an Anglo-Irish politician.

Langford was the younger son of Sir Hercules Langford, 1st Baronet and Mary Upton. He entered the Middle Temple in London in 1677 and was called to the bar there in 1682. He was High Sheriff of Meath in 1690. He was a Member of Parliament for St Johnstown, County Donegal in the Irish House of Commons between 1695 and 1699. He purchased an estate at Kingskerswell, Devon, in 1710 and was High Sheriff of Devon in 1716.

In 1716 he succeeded to his brother's baronetcy; the title became extinct upon Langford's death.

Parliament of Ireland
Preceded by John Forward; Charles Melville	Member of Parliament for St Johnstown, Co. Donegal; 1695-1699; With: Humphrey May	Succeeded by Kilner Brasier; Charles Melville
Baronetage of Ireland
Preceded by Arthur Langford	Baronet (of Kilmackevett); 1716-1725	Extinct
