= Langford baronets =

Extinct baronetcy in the Baronetage of Ireland

The Langford Baronetcy, of Kilmackevett in the County of Antrim, was a title in the Baronetage of Ireland. It was created on 19 August 1667 for Hercules Langford. The title became extinct on the death of the third Baronet in 1725. Mary, daughter of the first Baronet, married Sir John Rowley. Their grandson Hercules Langford Rowley married Elizabeth Upton, who was created Viscountess Langford in 1766. Their daughter the Hon. Jane Rowley married Thomas Taylour, 1st Earl of Bective. Lord and Lady Bective's fourth son Clotworthy Rowley was created Baron Langford in 1800.

== Langford baronets, of Kilmackevett (1667) ==
- Sir Hercules Langford, 1st Baronet (c. 1625–1683)
- Sir Arthur Langford, 2nd Baronet (c. 1652–1716)
- Sir Henry Langford, 3rd Baronet (c. 1656–1725), of Combe Satchville and Kingskerswell, Devon

== See also ==
- Viscountess Langford
- Baron Langford
