= Randal Beresford =

Anglo-Irish politician and baronet (died 1681)

Sir Randal Beresford, 2nd Baronet (died 19 October 1681) was an Anglo-Irish politician and baronet.

== Early life ==
He was the son of Sir Tristam Beresford, 1st Baronet and his first wife Anne Rowley, daughter of John Rowley of Castleroe, County Londonderry, the first Mayor of Derry, and Mary Gage. His paternal grandparents were Tristram Beresford, who was from Kent before settling in Ireland, and his wife Susannah Brooke.

== Career ==
Beresford entered the Irish House of Commons in 1661, sitting for Coleraine until 1668. He served with Stephen Cuppage, who died and was replaced by William Jackson in 1666. Five years later, he succeeded his father as baronet.

== Personal life ==
On 20 February 1662, he married Catherine Annesley, daughter of Francis Annesley, 1st Viscount Valentia and his second wife Jane Stanhope, and had by her three sons and two daughters, including:

- Sir Tristam Beresford, 3rd Baronet (1669–1701), who married Hon. Nichola Sophia Hamilton, youngest daughter of Hugh Hamilton, 1st Viscount of Glenawly, in 1687.
- Catherine Beresford, who married Matthew Pennefather, MP for Cashel, son of Matthew Pennefather, in 1697.
- Jane Beresford (d. 1716), who married Lt.-Gen. Frederick Hamilton, son of Archibald Hamilton (himself a son of Robert Hamilton, 7th of Fairholm and of Milburne).

Beresford died in 1681 and was buried at St Martin-in-the-Fields in London. He was succeeded in the baronetcy by his oldest surviving son Tristram.

=== Descendants ===
Through his daughter Catherine, he was a grandfather of Elizabeth Pennefather (c. 1713–1736/7), who married Alexander MacDonnell, 5th Earl of Antrim.

Baronetage of Ireland
Preceded by Tristram Beresford	Baronet (of Coleraine); 1673–1681	Succeeded by Tristram Beresford
