= John Beresford, 2nd Baron Decies =

Irish peer and clergyman

The Most Reverend The Lord Decies D.D.
- Born: John Beresford; 20 January 1774; Ireland
- Died: 1 March 1865 (aged 91); Bolam, Northumberland, England
- Spouse: Charlotte Horsley (m. 1810; died 1852)
- Children: 4, including William Beresford, 3rd Baron Decies and Caroline Graham, Duchess of Montrose
- Parent(s): William Beresford, 1st Baron Decies; Elizabeth FitzGibbon

John Beresford, 2nd Baron Decies (20 January 1774 – 1 March 1865), later Horsley-Beresford, was an Anglo-Irish peer and clergyman.

== Early life ==
Arms of De La Poer Beresford, Baron Decies

Beresford was born on 20 January 1774. He was the second son of nine children born to William Beresford, 1st Baron Decies and Elizabeth FitzGibbon, niece of John FitzGibbon, 1st Earl of Clare. His sister Louisa later married their first cousin, Marshal William Beresford, 1st Viscount Beresford.

His paternal grandparents were Marcus Beresford, 1st Earl of Tyrone and Lady Catharine Power (only daughter of James Power, 3rd Earl of Tyrone and 3rd Viscount Decies). Among his extended family were uncles George Beresford, 1st Marquess of Waterford and Hon. John Beresford.

He was educated at Emmanuel College, Cambridge University.

== Career ==
A clergyman in the Church of Ireland, he served as Rector of Tuam while his father was the Archbishop of Tuam from 1794 to 1819.

Upon his father's death on 6 September 1819, he succeeded as the 2nd Baron Decies as his elder brother, Brig.-Gen. Marcus Beresford had died unmarried in 1804.

== Personal life ==
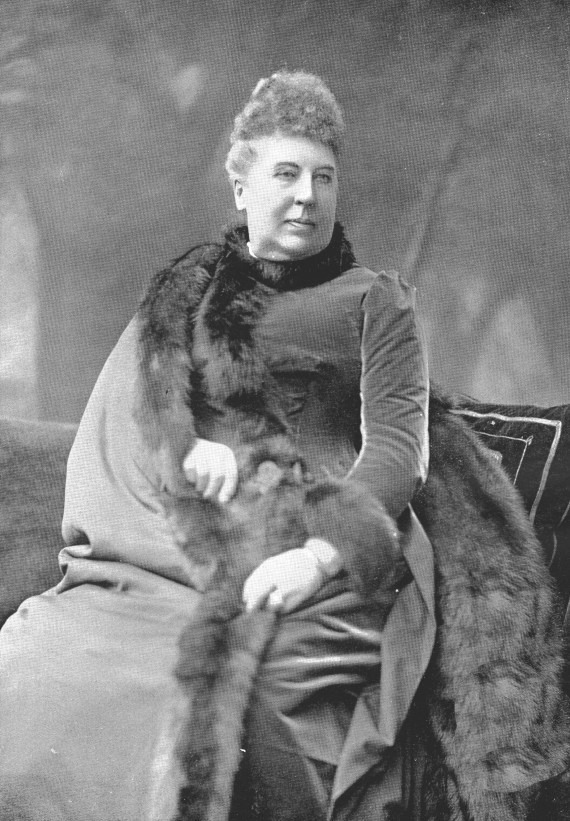
Lord Decies' youngest daughter, Caroline Agnes Graham, Duchess of Montrose.

On 26 July 1810, Beresford was married to Charlotte Philadelphia Horsley, the only daughter and heiress of Robert Horsley, of Bolam House, Bolam, Northumberland. Following his marriage, he adopted the additional surname of Horsley in accordance with the terms of his wife's inheritance. Together, they were the parents of one son and three daughters:

- William Robert John Horsley Beresford, 3rd Baron Decies (1811–1893), who succeeded.
- Hon. Georgiana Catherine Horsley Beresford (1812–1866)
- Hon. Louisa Elizabeth Horsley Beresford (1814–1891), who married Ernest Brudenell-Bruce, 3rd Marquess of Ailesbury, in 1834.
- Hon. Caroline Agnes Horsley Beresford, Duchess of Montrose (1818–1894), who married James Graham, 4th Duke of Montrose in 1836.

Lady Decies died on 9 March 1852. Lord Decies died on 1 March 1865 and was succeeded in the barony by his son William.

Peerage of Ireland
Preceded by William Beresford	Baron Decies; 1819–1865	Succeeded by William Robert John Horsley-Beresford
