= Margaret Dale (dancer) =

British ballet dancer (1922–2010)

- Born: 30 December 1922
- Died: 28 January 2010 (aged 87)
- Occupation: Dancer

Margaret Dale (30 December 1922 – 28 January 2010) was a British dancer who later became a producer and Director of Dance for BBC television.

== Early life and career ==
She was born as Margaret Elisabeth Bolam in Newcastle-upon-Tyne to John Howden Bolam and wife Gladys Margaret (Downs). She attended Dame Allan's School at Newcastle-on-Tyne and learned dancing from age 5. Between the 1940s and 1950s, she showed a flair for comedy, and sparkling technique when the company toured Europe and North America after World War II ended. She danced lead and soloist roles.

One of Dale's greatest achievements came when she filmed Ashton's two-act ballet La Fille Mal Gardée, with its original cast for television, uncut, shortly after it had triumphed in both New York City and Russia in 1960. Her black and white film documents the work's first cast and the choreographic details that were changed in subsequent performances. Dale's original cast television productions include Ashton's The Dream and Monotones ballets. Dale also produced documentaries on Gene Kelly, Rudolf Nureyev, Ninette de Valois, and others. She worked with up-and-comers such as John Cranko and Glen Tetley.

In 1976, after retiring from the BBC, Dale taught in Canada, chairing the department of dance at York University in Toronto.

== Personal life ==
Margaret Dale was married and divorced to John Hart and had no children. She died on 28 January 2010, aged 87.

== Obituaries ==
- The Telegraph
- NY Times
- The Guardian
