= William Beresford, 1st Baron Decies =

Anglo-Irish bishop (1743–1819)

The Right Reverend and Right Honourable The Lord Decies PC (Ire), D.D.
- Archbishop of Tuam
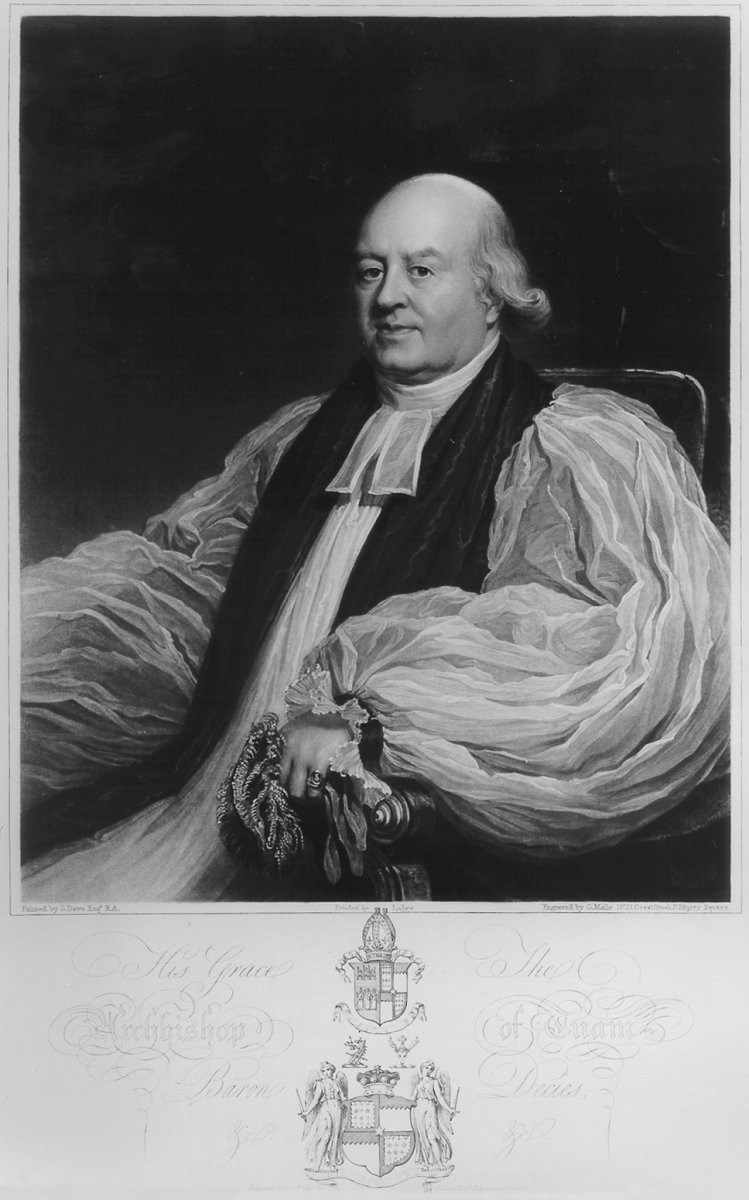
- Church: Church of Ireland
- Archdiocese: Tuam
- In office: 1794–1819
- Predecessor: Joseph Bourke
- Successor: Power Le Poer Trench
- Previous posts: Bishop of Dromore (1780–1782); Bishop of Ossory (1782–1794)

Orders
- Consecration: 8 April 1780 by Richard Robinson

Personal details
- Born: 16 April 1743
- Died: 6 September 1819 (aged 76) Tuam, County Galway, Ireland
- Denomination: Anglican
- Spouse: Elizabeth Fitzgibbon

William Beresford, 1st Baron Decies (16 April 1743 – 6 September 1819) was an Anglo-Irish clergyman.

== Early life ==
Decies was the third son, out of seven sons and eight daughters, of Marcus Beresford, 1st Earl of Tyrone (himself the only son of Sir Tristram Beresford, 3rd Baronet), and Catherine Poer, 1st Baroness de la Poer, the only daughter and heiress of James Power, 3rd Earl of Tyrone and 3rd Viscount Decies. Among his siblings were George Beresford, 1st Marquess of Waterford, John Beresford, MP for Waterford, Catherine Beresford (wife of Thomas Christmas MP and Theophilus Jones MP), Frances Beresford (wife of Henry Flood), and Eliza Beresford (wife of Col. Thomas Cobbe MP, son of Charles Cobbe, Archbishop of Dublin).

Beresford was educated at Trinity College Dublin.

== Career ==
He served as Bishop of Dromore from 1780 to 1782, Bishop of Ossory from 1782 to 1794, and as Archbishop of Tuam from 1794 until his death in 1819. He was admitted to the Irish Privy Council in 1794 and in 1812 he was raised to the Peerage of Ireland as Baron Decies, of Decies in the County of Waterford.

== Personal life ==
On 16 June 1763, Beresford married Elizabeth FitzGibbon (1732–1807), daughter of John FitzGibbon and wife Isabella Grove. Elizabeth's brother was John FitzGibbon, 1st Earl of Clare, the Lord Chancellor of Ireland. They had nine children, four sons and five daughters:

- Brig-Gen. Marcus Beresford (1764–1803), who died unmarried.
- Rev. John Beresford, 2nd Baron Decies (1773–1855), who married Charlotte Philadelphia Horsley, only daughter and heiress of Robert Horsley.
- Hon. Rev. George Beresford (1776–1842), who married Susannah Gorges in 1798.
- Hon. Rev. William Beresford (1780–1830), who married Lady Anna Bennet, daughter of the 4th Earl of Tankerville, in 1804.
- Hon. Catherine Eleanor Beresford (d. 1837), who married Rev. William Armstrong in 1789.
- Hon. Araminta Anne Beresford (d. 1816), who married the Very Rev. Arthur John Preston in 1794.
- Hon. Harriet Beresford (d. 1834), who married Thomas Henry Bermingham Daly Sewell in 1796.
- Hon. Frances Beresford (d. 1864), who married Col. Thomas Burrowes in 1797.
- Hon. Louisa de la Poer Beresford (d. 1851), who married Thomas Hope in 1806. After his death in 1831, she married her first cousin William Beresford, 1st Viscount Beresford in 1832.

Lord Decies died in September 1819, aged 76, and was succeeded in the barony by his eldest surviving son John; his eldest son Marcus had died in 1803.

=== Descendants ===
Through his third son, he was a grandfather of British Army officer Marcus Beresford (1800–1876), who was also an MP for Northallerton and Berwick-upon-Tweed.

Through his youngest daughter Louisa, he was a grandfather of British MP and patron of the arts, Henry Thomas Hope (1808–1862), whose daughter Henrietta married Henry Pelham-Clinton, 6th Duke of Newcastle, and British MP Alexander Beresford Hope (1820–1887), who married Lady Mildred Gascoyne-Cecil (a daughter of James Gascoyne-Cecil, 2nd Marquess of Salisbury).

== Bibliography ==
- Kidd, Charles; Williamson, David (eds.). Debrett's Peerage and Baronetage (1990 ed.). New York: St Martin's Press.
- Leigh Rayment's Peerage Pages
- "William Beresford, 1st Baron Decies". Thepeerage.com.
- Venn, J. A., ed. (1940). Alumni Cantabrigienses. London: Cambridge University Press.

Church of Ireland titles
Preceded by James Hawkins	Bishop of Dromore; 1780–1782	Succeeded by Thomas Percy
Preceded by John Hotham	Bishop of Ossory; 1782–1794	Succeeded by Thomas O'Beirne
Preceded by Joseph Bourke	Archbishop of Tuam; 1794–1819	Succeeded by Power Le Poer Trench
Peerage of Ireland
New title	Baron Decies; 1812–1819	Succeeded by John Horsley-Beresford
