= John Beresford, 5th Baron Decies =

Anglo-Irish army officer (1866–1944)

The Right Honourable The Lord Decies PC
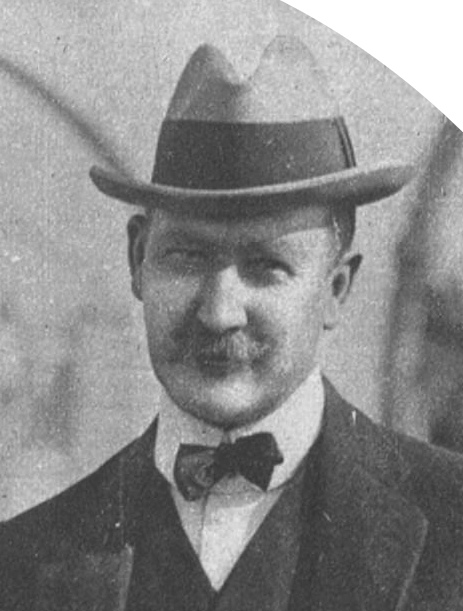
- Lord Decies in 1919

Representative peer for Ireland
- In office 1912–1944
- Preceded by: The Lord Crofton
- Succeeded by: Office lapsed

Personal details
- Born: John Graham Hope Horsley de la Poer Beresford; 5 December 1866 Newcastle upon Tyne
- Died: 31 January 1944 (aged 77) Ascot, Berkshire
- Spouses: Helen Vivien Gould (m. 1911; died 1931) Elizabeth Wharton Drexel (m. 1936)
- Children: 3
- Parent(s): William Horsley-Beresford, 3rd Baron Decies; Catherine Anne Dent
- Education: Eton College

Medal record

Men's polo

Representing Mixed team

Olympic Games
Gold medal – first place	1900 Paris	Team competition

John Graham Hope Horsley de la Poer Beresford, 5th Baron Decies PC (5 December 1866 – 31 January 1944), styled The Hon. John Beresford until 1910, was an Anglo-Irish army officer, civil servant, and polo player in the 1900 Summer Olympics.

== Early life ==
Beresford was born on 5 December 1866 at Newcastle upon Tyne. He was the second son of William Horsley-Beresford, 3rd Baron Decies, by Catherine Anne Dent, daughter of Commander William Dent. He was educated at Eton before joining the army in 1887.

== Career ==
Beresford joined the 7th Hussars as a second lieutenant in February 1887, was promoted to Lieutenant on 10 April 1889, and to Captain on 7 October 1896. He saw military service mainly in Africa, first during the Second Matabele War in 1896 and later during the Second Boer War. In January 1900 he was seconded to the Staff, and appointed an Aide-de-camp to the Duke of Connaught, Commander-in-Chief of Ireland. In early February 1902, he was appointed in command of the 37th Battalion, Imperial Yeomanry, with the temporary rank of lieutenant-colonel, and the following May left Aldershot with his battalion for service in South Africa. The battalion arrived after hostilities ended in early June, and left for home again on the SS Avondale Castle in late December 1902, following which he relinquished his command in February 1903 and returned to his regular battalion. From 1903 to 1904 he served in Somaliland. After retiring from the Regular Army, he became commanding officer of the South Irish Horse (Special Reserve) on 20 January 1912.

In 1910 he succeeded his elder brother in the barony. This was an Irish peerage and did not entitle him to an automatic seat in the House of Lords. However, in 1912 he was elected as an Irish representative peer and was able to take a seat in the upper chamber of Parliament. From 1916 to 1919 he was Chief Press Censor for Ireland.

Time magazine on 5 May 1930 reported his stance on British taxation:

"The time may have come," said Lord Decies ominously, "when our wealthy men should seriously consider whether they must send their money out of this country." As Director of the British Income Taxpayers' Association, he vowed that he would suggest to them that "the time may have come. ..."

=== Polo ===
Beresford was an Irish polo player in the 1900 Summer Olympics. He was part of the Foxhunters Hurlingham polo team which won the gold medal.

In 1908, he played in the first international polo match between England and Argentina at the Hurlingham Club in Hurlingham, Buenos Aires alongside Alexander Godley.

== Personal life ==
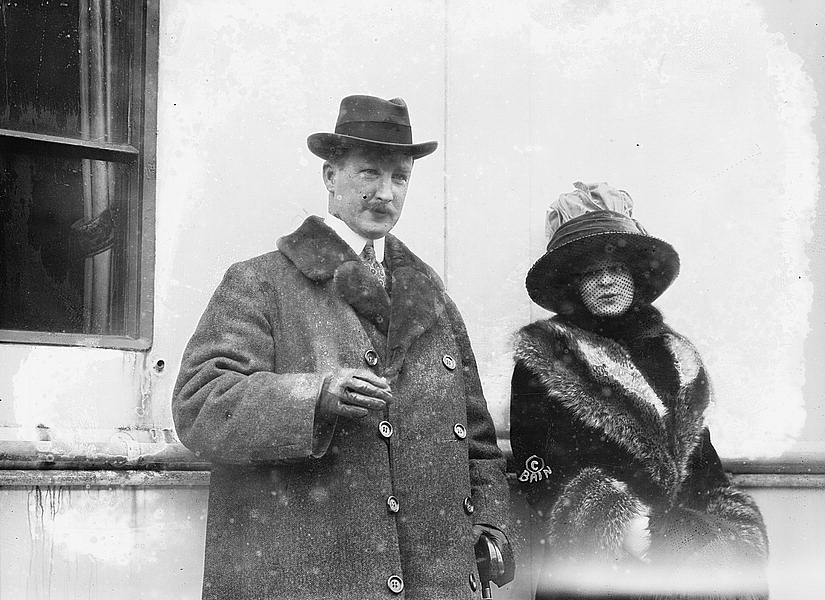
Lord Decies and his first wife, Helen, in 1911

Lord Decies married Helen Vivien Gould, a daughter of American railroad executive George Jay Gould I and actress Edith Kingdon, on 7 February 1911. They had three children:

- Hon. Eileen Vivien de la Poer Beresford (1912–1975) who married Major Robert Alfred O'Brian.
- Hon. Catherine Moya de la Poer Beresford (1913–1967), who married Patrick Herbert Bellew in 1936; they divorced in 1946.
- Arthur George Marcus Douglas de la Poer Beresford, 6th Baron Decies (1915–1992).

Lady Decies died on 3 February 1931, and following her death he married Elizabeth Wharton Drexel, the daughter of Joseph William Drexel, on 25 May 1936. Elizabeth had previously been married to Harry Lehr and John Vinton Dahlgren. Lord Decies filed suit for divorce in 1942, which Lady Decies contested.

Asked how to say his name, Lord Decies told The Literary Digest: "With ci as in conscience it is dee-shees, and Beresford is berysford."

Lord Decies died on 31 January 1944 at his Ascot home. Lady Decies died at the Hotel Shelton in London on 13 June 1944.

Political offices
Preceded by The Lord Crofton	Representative peer for Ireland; 1912–1944	Succeeded by office lapsed
Peerage of Ireland
Preceded by William Marcus de la Poer Beresford	Baron Decies; 1910–1944	Succeeded by Arthur George Marcus Douglas de la Poer Beresford
