= Bolam, Northumberland =

Village in Northumberland, England

Coordinates: 55.136°N 1.852°W

Bolam
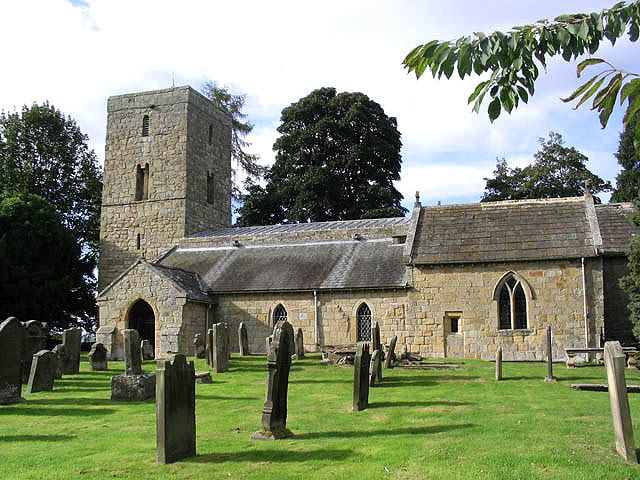
- St Andrew's parish church

- Location within Northumberland
- OS grid reference: NZ095825
- Civil parish: Belsay
- Unitary authority: Northumberland
- Ceremonial county: Northumberland
- Region: North East
- Country: England
- Sovereign state: United Kingdom
- Post town: Morpeth
- Postcode district: NE61
- Dialling code: 01661
- Police: Northumbria
- Fire: Northumberland
- Ambulance: North East
- UK Parliament: Hexham
- Website: Belsay Parish Council

Bolam is a village in the civil parish of Belsay in the county of Northumberland, England. The village is about 20 miles (32 km) north-west of Newcastle upon Tyne, near Bolam West Houses.

== History ==
The Church of England parish church of St Andrew has a late Saxon west tower and is a Grade I listed building.

In 1305, Bolam had a market, a fair, a castle and about 200 houses around a village green

Shortflatt Tower, about 1.5 miles (2.4 km) south-west of the village, is a late 15th or early 16th century pele tower, with a 17th-century house attached, and is also Grade I listed.

Bolam is the burial place of Robert de Reymes, a wealthy Suffolk merchant, who in 1296 began the building of Aydon Castle, near Corbridge.

In 1951 the civil parish had a population of 60. On 1 April 1955 the parish was abolished and merged with Belsay.

== Landmarks ==
Bolam Lake Country Park is next to the village.

Three archaeological sites are nearby: Huckhoe Settlement, an iron Age and Romano-British defended settlement; Slate Hill Settlement, an Iron Age defended settlement; and The Poind and his Man, a Neolithic site.

== Sources ==
- Allsopp, Bruce; Clark, Ursula (1969). Historic Architecture of Northumberland. Newcastle upon Tyne: Oriel Press. ISBN 0 85362 062 8.
