= Sir Tristram Beresford, 1st Baronet =

Irish soldier and politician (died 1673)

Sir Tristram Beresford, 1st Baronet (died 15 January 1673) was an Anglo-Irish soldier and politician. He was the ancestor of the Marquesses of Waterford, the Barons Decies and the Beresford baronets, of William Beresford, 1st Viscount Beresford and Charles Beresford, 1st Baron Beresford.

== Early life ==
He was the eldest son of Tristram Beresford, who had originated from Kent and settled in Ireland, and his wife Susannah Brooke.

== Career ==
Beresford became manager of the Corporation of London's Londonderry Plantation and entered the Irish House of Commons in 1634 as the member for County Londonderry. He then represented the counties of Londonderry, Donegal and Tyrone from 1656 until 1658 in the Second Protectorate Parliament at Westminster. After the Restoration of 1660 he finally stood successfully for Londonderry in the Irish Parliament of 1661, holding the seat for the next five years. He was knighted in 1664 and was created a Baronet, of Coleraine in the County of Londonderry, on 5 May of the following year.

== Personal life ==
He married firstly Anne Rowley, oldest daughter of John Rowley of Castleroe, County Londonderry, the first Mayor of Derry, and Mary Gage, and had by her a son and two daughters. After her death Beresford married Sarah Sackville, whose parents names are uncertain. By his second wife he had another three sons and three daughters.

Beresford died on 18 January 1673 and was buried in Coleraine five days later. He was succeeded in the baronetcy by his oldest son Randal.

Baronetage of Ireland
New creation	Baronet (of Coleraine); 1665–1673	Succeeded by Randal Beresford
