= Newnham Priory =

Priory in Bedford, England

- Location within Bedfordshire Location within the United Kingdom

Monastery information
- Order: Augustinian
- Established: c. 1166
- Controlled churches: 14

People
- Founder: Simon de Beauchamp
- Prior: William, first prior (app. 1166); John Burne, last prior (occurs 1540)

Site
- Location: Newnham, Bedford, Bedfordshire
- Country: England
- Coordinates: 52.14076°N 0.44512°W

Newnham Priory was a priory in Newnham, Bedford, Bedfordshire, England.

== History ==
=== Foundation ===
The Augustinian priory of Newnham was not actually built until some time after the accession of Henry II, but it may fairly claim to be the most ancient religious foundation in Bedfordshire, in so far as it still held the church of St. Paul's and succeeded to the endowments of the secular canons there. It is implied in the Domesday Book that these latter were in Bedford before the Conquest; and Leland records the tradition that they lived in houses 'round about the Church.' How long they had been there, and whether they were in any way descended from the original monastery of Bedford, named in 971 in the Anglo-Saxon Chronicle, it is difficult now to discover: all we know is that they were living at the Conquest as secular canons, and had property at Biddenham and Bedford. Their patron at this time must have been Hugh de Beauchamp, who first held the barony of Bedford; a little later Payn de Beauchamp, son of Hugh, and his sister Ellen are both named as benefactors.

However the foundation of the priory of Newnham was the work of Simon de Beauchamp, son of Payn, about 1166. Tradition ascribes the change to the scandal caused by the affair of Philip de Broi, one of the canons, whose name has become famous in connection with the quarrel between Thomas Becket and Henry II. This man was accused of homicide, and cleared himself by oath; but the evidence was so much against him that Simon Fitz Peter, the king's justiciar, summoned him to a new trial. On receiving the summons, Philip broke out into such angry words and insults against the justiciar that the king considered his own authority slighted in the person of his delegate; and the archbishop, fearing that a very severe punishment would follow, interposed and passed sentence upon the offender in his own court. This sentence—the loss of his prebend, and further some penance for two years only—was considered by the king as a glaring instance of the failure of the ecclesiastical courts in dealing with serious crimes; it contributed something towards the estrangement between him and the archbishop, and also made it advisable for the canons to change their place of residence.

This story has quite good authority, but it has probably no causal connection with the foundation of Newnham Priory. The change from secular to regular canons was going on in many religious houses at this time; the scandal of Philip de Broi can only at the most have hastened an event already inevitable. All that Simon de Beauchamp says is that prudent and religious men had often counselled him to turn the gifts and endowments of his ancestors to a use more productive of reverence to God and honour to true religion, and that he was at last convinced of the wisdom of their advice. He names the king, Henry II, Pope Alexander III, Blessed Thomas the Martyr and Bishop Robert of Lincoln as having given their consent.

The transference of all the endowments of the secular canons to William, first prior of Newnham, was solemnly made in the church of St. Paul in the presence of many witnesses. The old canons were six in number: Nicholas archdeacon of Bedford, was one of them. They probably kept some portion of their prebends for the term of their lives; perhaps being presented to or left in possession of churches in the gift of the house. The priory was specially rich in churches: fourteen are named in the first charter of Simon de Beauchamp, and eleven of these were still the property of the house in 1535. Simon's endowment was a generous one; his mother and other benefactors added to it, but his own title to the name of founder is unquestionable.

=== External history ===
During the first century of their existence the canons of Newnham had a good deal to endure. They had first to suffer from the violence of Falkes de Breauté, who with the consent and approval of King John actually pulled down the greater part of the church of St. Paul to strengthen the fortifications of Bedford Castle; he was probably an oppressive neighbour all the time he lived there, until the capture of the castle in 1223 by Henry III. The losses of the canons were partly made good to them by the gift of the church of Tinden, and by a present of stones from the dismantled castle.

It was in the same year (Easter term 1223) that the priory was involved in a very interesting suit for the church of Aspley Guise. There were three claimants in the field, namely Fawkes de Bréauté and the priors of Dunstable and of Newnham. The last parson, Nicholas, has been presented by Roger de Salford, who held a knight's fee of Simon de Beauchamp in 1166. This Roger had then given the advowson to the church of Dunstable, his charter being confirmed by Simon de Beauchamp and by Robert Bishop of Lincoln. The prior of Newnham pleaded that Guy de St. Walery and Aubreye his wife had given the church to St. Paul's, Bedford, their gift being confirmed by Simon de Beauchamp and Bishop Hugh. It was proved that Roger had only held Aspley as baillee until he was assigned land to the value of £10 elsewhere (which he afterwards received in Stotfold), and that Guy de St. Walery had recovered Aspley against him by fine. Therefore, his gift was invalid, and Newnham was assigned the church under St. Walery's gift.

But new troubles soon arose through the tyrannical behaviour of William de Beauchamp, son of the founder; who, encouraged by his wife Ida, proved himself quite as much an enemy to the religious of the neighbourhood as Fawkes de Bréauté had been. The first difficulty was connected with the church of Wootton, and other property of the priory; but it was at the election of a prior that William's conduct at last brought him under episcopal censure. The charter of Simon had provided that the convent should have the right of free election, only asking his consent as patron: William wished to do the part of both bishop and patron. There was some unpleasantness over an election in 1247; but in 1254 William came in person to the priory with his wife, and compelled the new prior, Stephen, to come outside the gate to him to receive the temporalities; then, taking him by the hand, he led him into the church, and installed him in his place in choir. This, however, was too much for the bishop: he at once visited the priory and made William apologise for his invasion of the liberties of the church. It is possible that the great charter of Newnham, in which William confirmed all the gifts of his father and others, including the licence for free election, belongs to this time. The next of the Beauchamps, another William, made some reparation for the misdeeds of his father.

When the barony of Bedford passed to the Mowbrays the advowson of the priory went with it. An attempt was made in 1347, at the death of John of Astwick, to prove that it was held of the king in capite; but the jury then called proved conclusively that it was held always of the barony of Bedford, and that Sir John Mowbray was at that time the patron. Thomas Mowbray, Earl Marshal, confirmed the charter of William de Beauchamp. The foundation charter, charter of transference to Newnham and others were confirmed by Henry II. Edward I, Edward II, Edward III and Richard II; the last royal charter was that of Henry IV. dated 15 February 1408–9.

=== Internal history ===
Of the internal history of the priory we know very little. It seems to have had a good reputation at all times. Hervey, the prior in 1228 (previously prior of Osney), was commissioned in that year, with Richard de Morins of Dunstable, to visit all the houses of their order throughout the dioceses of Lincoln and Coventry; two priors resigned in consequence. In Grossetête's unsparing visitations of 1235 and 1249 no charge was laid against this house; and no other visitation is recorded until that of Bishop Burghersh some time before 1322. The prior at that time, John of Astwick, was very unpopular, and anxious in consequence to resign; but the bishop thought it sufficient to urge the brethren to be more exact in their obedience. Bishop Buckingham sent an order in 1387 that 'peace should be established between the priories of Newnham and Caldwell;' it would be interesting to know what was the matter in dispute, as there was usually so much goodwill between the various houses of Austin canons in this county. A year later a brother was received back, who had become an apostate through discontent and was now repentant. At the visitation of Bishop Grey the discipline of the house was still good; all that the bishop enjoined was that the sub-prior should do the work of the prior, now grown old and feeble. Later, when Cardinal Wolsey undertook to reform the whole Augustinian order, it seems that Newnham was still amongst the more satisfactory houses. At the great general chapter summoned at Reading in June 1518 (the first after the lapse of more than a century) the prior of Newnham was chosen as one of the definitors, and made visitor for two counties.

The prior, John Ashwell, with fourteen canons and two lay brothers, signed an acknowledgement of the royal supremacy in 1535. It is probable that these seventeen were but a small proportion of the original number. Nothing is known of the circumstances of the surrender of the house, except that it was made by a prior who had not been long in office, and took place on 2 January 1540–1. A pension of £60 was granted to the prior, John Burne, and pensions of other sums to fifteen canons besides.

=== Endowments ===
The original endowment of the priory by Simon de Beauchamp comprised the tithes of fourteen churches—St. Paul's Bedford, Renhold, Ravensden, Great Barford, Willington, Cardington, Southill, Hatley, Wootton, Stagsden, Lower Gravenhurst, Aspley, Salford, Goldington; portions of land in many places which had belonged to the old canons; the tithes of all his markets, assarts and woods; the castle mill and another with some lands and water attached; the free use of all waters belonging to the castle, as far as Fenlake, for fishing, navigation and breeding swans; and the right to pasture a certain number of cattle with his own free of cost. These gifts are rehearsed with much detail and some additions in the Great Charter of William de Beauchamp. At the time of the Taxatio of Pope Nicholas IV the income of the priory appears as £164 10s. 8d., of which £92 6s. 8d. is made up of spiritualities. The largest items amongst the temporalities are lands, etc., at Goldington, Salpho, Stotfold and Sharnbrook; and these are found in the Feudal aids as portions of knights' fees.

In 1302 the prior of Newnham held half a knight's fee in Sharnbrook, several fractions in Goldington, and half a knight's fee in Salpho. In 1316 half a fee in Goldington, a quarter in Salpho, one seventh in Biddenham, one quarter in Southill. In 1346 half a fee in Cotes and half a fee in Sharnbrook. In 1428 the same as in 1346 with the addition of half a knight's fee in Salpho, and a quarter in Blunham and Moggerhanger.

A comparison of the Valor and the Taxatio shows however that the property of the priory was almost the same in extent at both dates, varying very little in the course of history. It was all within the county of Bedford. Not one of the churches of the original endowment was quite lost, though three were only paying small pensions in 1535. Besides divers parcels of land the prior held the manors of Stotfold and Cardington. The total valuation in 1535 was £284 12s. 11¾d.; in 1541 the ministers' accounts give only a total of £200 17s. 8¾d.

== Priors of Newnham ==
The priors of Newnham were:

- William, first prior, appointed 1166
- Ralph, occurs 1198 and 1205
- Eustace, occurs 1214, died 1225
- Harvey, elected 1225, died or resigned 1238
- Walter, elected 1238, died 1247
- Walter of Chawston, elected 1247
- Stephen, elected 1254, died 1264
- William le Fraunceys, elected 1264, died 1271
- William le Ros, elected 1271, died 1272
- Michael of Goldington, elected 1272, died 1283
- John of Bedford, elected 1283, resigned 1300
- Adam of Sherborne, elected 1300, resigned 1300
- William of Biddenham, elected 1300, died 1307
- William of Thorp, elected 1307, resigned 1315
- John of Astwick, elected 1315, resigned 1347
- John of Amersham, elected 1347, resigned 1348
- Henry of Woodford, elected 1348, died 1349
- William of Woodford, elected 1349
- Nicholas Baldock, elected 1362, died 1369
- John of Biddenham, elected 1369, died 1395
- William of Woughton, elected 1395
- John Bromham, occurs 1437 and 1441
- John, occurs 1477 and 1490
- Henry of Newnham, occurs 1493
- John Ashwell, occurs 1535
- John Burne, occurs 1540

== Common seal ==
The conventual seal was large and elaborate. It represents St. Paul seated on a throne, under a trefoiled canopy, with sword in his right hand; an angel above on either side, and groups of votaries under arches to the right and left, with the moon above one group and the sun above the other. Legend: SIGILL' PRIORIS ET CONVENTUS SBĪ PAULI DE NEWEHAM.

Counter-seal: three niches. In the middle St. Paul kneeling with an executioner behind him; above his head PAULV and possibly a hand of blessing. St. Luke and St. Titus on the left and right, with their names above them. Legend: MUCRO . FUROR . SAULI . FUIT . ENS[IS . PAS]SIO . PAULI.

There is a seal of William of Woughton, prior 1395, pointed oval, representing St. Paul seated in a canopied niche, pinnacled and crocketted, holding a sword in the right hand and a book in the left, between two shields, one with a lion and the other a cross paty; and a prior below, half length, with hands folded in prayer. Legend: S. FRATRIS WILTĪ DE WOKETONE PRIORIS DE NEWED.

The seal of Henry de Newnham (1493) is the same. Legend: s. F'RIS HENRIC' NEWNAM PRIORIS DE NEWEHAM.

== See also ==
- List of monastic houses in Bedfordshire

== Notes ==
- This article is based on The Priory of Newnham, in The Victoria History of the County of Bedford: Volume 1, 1904
