= David Flitwick =

David Flitwick may refer to:

- David Flitwick (died 1353)
- David Flitwick (died 1296)
