= Pulloxhill Grange =

Priory in Bedfordshire, England

- Interactive map of Pulloxhill Grange
- 51.994315°N 0.453444°W
- Type: Priory
- Location: Pulloxhill, Bedfordshire, England

Listed Building – Grade II
- Designated: 23 January 1961
- Reference no.: 1138009

Pulloxhill Grange was a priory in Bedfordshire, England. It is a Grade II listed building.

In 1535, Dunstable Priory received from Woburn Abbey 5s. for land it held in Pulloxhill. In 1291, the value of the abbey's estates in Pulloxhill was £7 2s. 5d.

In 1330, the abbey claimed sac and soc in Pulloxhill.

In 1547, after the Dissolution of the monasteries, Pulloxhill Grange, was granted to Sir William Pagett.

== See also ==
- List of monastic houses in Bedfordshire
