= Melchbourne Preceptory =

Defunct priory in Bedfordshire, England

- Location within Bedfordshire Location within the United Kingdom

Monastery information
- Order: Knights Hospitallers
- Established: 12th century
- Disestablished: c. 1550

Architecture
- Functional status: Demolished

Site
- Location: Melchbourne, Bedfordshire
- Country: England
- Coordinates: 52.271256°N 0.492454°W

Melchbourne Preceptory was a priory in Melchbourne, Bedfordshire, England. It was established in the 12th century and disestablished around 1550.

== History ==
The preceptory of Melchbourne was founded in the reign of Henry II as the result of gifts by Alice de Clare, widow of Aubrey de Vere II, following the killing of the latter by a London mob in 1141. Other benefactors, including Roger de Clare, Earl of Hertford, Hugh de Beauchamp of Eaton, and William, Archbishop of York, added gifts of land and churches. Alice de Clare was the daughter of Richard de Clare, and Alice (or Adeliza) de Clermont. A general chapter was held at this preceptory in 1242, under the presidency of Brother Terricus de Nussa, prior of the hospital in England; and there were numerous "Commanderies" (equivalent to Annual General Meetings) held at the Melchbourne Preceptory up to the end of the 15th Century. Two Grand Priors of the Knights of Saint John of Jerusalem (Knights Hospitallers) were direct descendants of Aubrey de Vere II and Alice de Clare. The last Grand Prior of England, Sir William Weston, had a house built for him in 1528/29, the cellars of which survive under the present Melchbourne House, dating from about 1612.

The last remains of the Preceptory were bulldozed away in 1944 to make way for a baseball ground for serving US 8th Air Force personnel. On two occasions the Hospitallers of Bedfordshire came into collision with the canons of Dunstable Priory, on account of one of the customs of their order. They were allowed by a special privilege of the pope to grant Christian burial to all those who had given alms to their fraternity, whatever the manner of their death. So in 1274, when the canons of Dunstable refused to bury a suicide, the Hospitallers impleaded them, and they had to pay a fine for the sake of peace. Again in 1282, when one of the servants of John Duraunt, a merchant of Dunstable, committed suicide by jumping into a well, and his body in consequence was flung into a ditch outside the town, the Hospitallers found him and buried him in their cemetery.

The Hospitallers, like other religious, received boarders into their houses from time to time. In 1527 a certain William Browne received a grant of board and lodging in the preceptory of Melchbourne, from the prior of the hospital. References to this house are very few and far between: except in a few notices of leases, it is not mentioned in the large chartularies of the order.

The date of the dissolution of the preceptory is not known. It was refounded for a very short time in 1557 by Mary I of England, and again made a part of the endowment of the order.

The preceptory received at its foundation the manor and church of Melchbourne, and the churches of Dean, Riseley, Souldrop, Eaton Socon, with Hargrave (Northants), and Eakring, Ossington and Winkbourn (Notts), as well as parcels of land and wood in Riseley, Souldrop, Blakesley (Northants), Ossington and Winkbourn (Notts). The prior of the hospital held in Bedfordshire in 1302 one knight's fee and a half in Clifton, and one hide in Pulloxhill; in 1316 the vill of Melchbourne, half a fee in Podington, one fee in Clifton, and small portions in Souldrop, Sharnbrook and Sandy; in 1346 Melchbourne, half a fee in Ickwell, Clifton and Harrold, and one quarter in Souldrop, Steppingley and Sharnbrook, with a smaller portion in Stanford; in 1428 the vill of Melchbourne, half a fee in Sharnbrook, Harrold, Ickwell and Clifton, and a quarter in Souldrop. At the dissolution the property of the preceptory was worth £241 9s. 10½d., including the manors of Melchbourne, Ickwell, Eaton, Langford and Blakesley, and rectories of Melchbourne, Eaton, Riseley, Langford, Blakesley, and lands called the Temple in Sharnbrook.

In 1278 to 1279, the prior claimed frankpledge in Souldrop Manor, but after the Dissolution of the Monasteries, it was given to Thomas Cobbe of Sharnbrook, (before 1573).

== Location ==
About its location, the 1904 Victoria History of the County of Bedford: Volume 3 says:

There was at one time in Melchbourne a preceptory of the Knights of Jerusalem. Its site can still be traced to the south of the Cottage, and it is thus described by Leland, writing in the 16th century:— 'Here is a right fair place of square stone standing much upon pillared vaults of stone, and there be goodly gardens orchards and ponds and a parke thereby.' The Knights Hospitallers had the right to hold a weekly market on Friday, and an annual fair on the vigil, feast and morrow of St. Mary Magdalene. The site of the old market cross is at the junction of the lane from the village with the road to Knotting.

The Victoria History of the County of Bedford had, as of June 2023, mistaken the donor of land and buildings to the Knights Hospitallers as Alice de Clermont, when in fact it was her daughter Alice de Clare. This error was corrected in "Melchbourne - A History", 2010; and in Bedford Borough Council: "Melchbourne Priory", June 2023.

== See also ==
- List of monastic houses in Bedfordshire

== Notes ==
- This article is based on The Priory of Caldwell, in The Victoria History of the County of Bedford: Volume 1, 1904
- Melchbourne Church
