= Dunstable Friary =

Dominican friary in Bedfordshire, England

- Location within Bedfordshire Location within the United Kingdom
- Interactive map of Dunstable Friary

Monastery information
- Order: Dominican

People
- Important associated figures: Black Friars

Architecture
- Status: In ruins
- Groundbreaking: 13th century

Site
- Location: Dunstable, Bedfordshire
- Country: England
- Coordinates: 51.8841°N 0.5204°W

Dunstable Friary was a Dominican friary in Dunstable, Bedfordshire, England. It was located to the west of Watling Street, between the present-day High Street South and the road that is called Friary Field.

The "Black Friars" came to Dunstable in 1259. The Augustine canons of Dunstable Priory, who themselves were facing economic hardship at the time, were not welcoming towards the Dominicans. The prioress of Markyate, though her own house was not a wealthy one, helped the friars with a dole of loaves until their church should be finished; a kindness ill-repaid, for they insisted on the continuance of the gift after the immediate necessity was passed, and when the nuns were almost as poor as themselves.

The grounds were surrendered in 1539.

Parts of the site were excavated in the 1920s. From 1965 to 1967, the Manshead Archaeological Society carried out excavations of the monastic buildings, during which the Dunstable Swan Jewel was discovered. Parts of the church were excavated by the Department of the Environment in 1972 and by Bedfordshire County Council in 1988.

== See also ==
- List of monastic houses in Bedfordshire
