= Flitwick Castle =

Motte-and-bailey castle in Central Bedfordshire, UK

- Flitwick, Bedfordshire, England
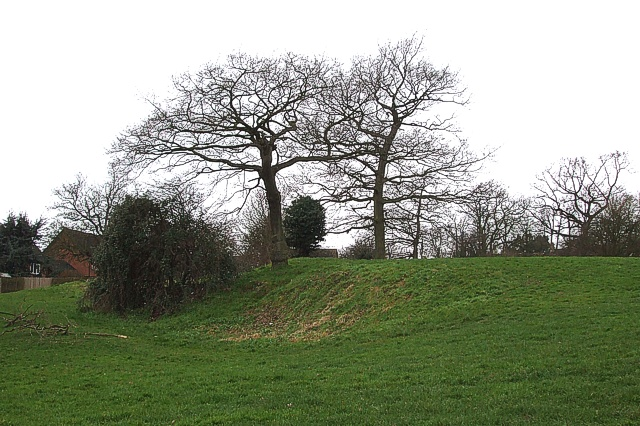
- Flitwick Castle earthworks, 2007

Site information
- Type: Castle
- Condition: Earthworks

Location
- Shown within Bedfordshire
- Coordinates: 51.99752°N 0.50490°W
- Grid reference: grid reference TL02723428

Flitwick Castle was an 11th-century castle located in the town of Flitwick, in the county of Bedfordshire, England. It now exists only as ruins, reduced to little but an earth mound.

It was a small, timber Motte-and-bailey castle, surrounded by a moat. The castle was mentioned in the Domesday Book, in 1086, as being under the ownership of William Lovet, a Norman. Lovet had displaced Alwin, who had been the Saxon owner of Flitwick prior to the Norman Conquest.

The earthwork remains of the castle are on what is now a public green space known as Temple Field or Mount Hill. The ditches have been filled in and the mound is now about 7 m (20 ft) high. The name Temple Field takes its name from the nearby church. The site is a Scheduled Monument.

== See also ==
- Castles in Great Britain and Ireland
- List of castles in England
