= List of monastic houses in Bedfordshire =

Locations of monastic houses in Bedfordshire
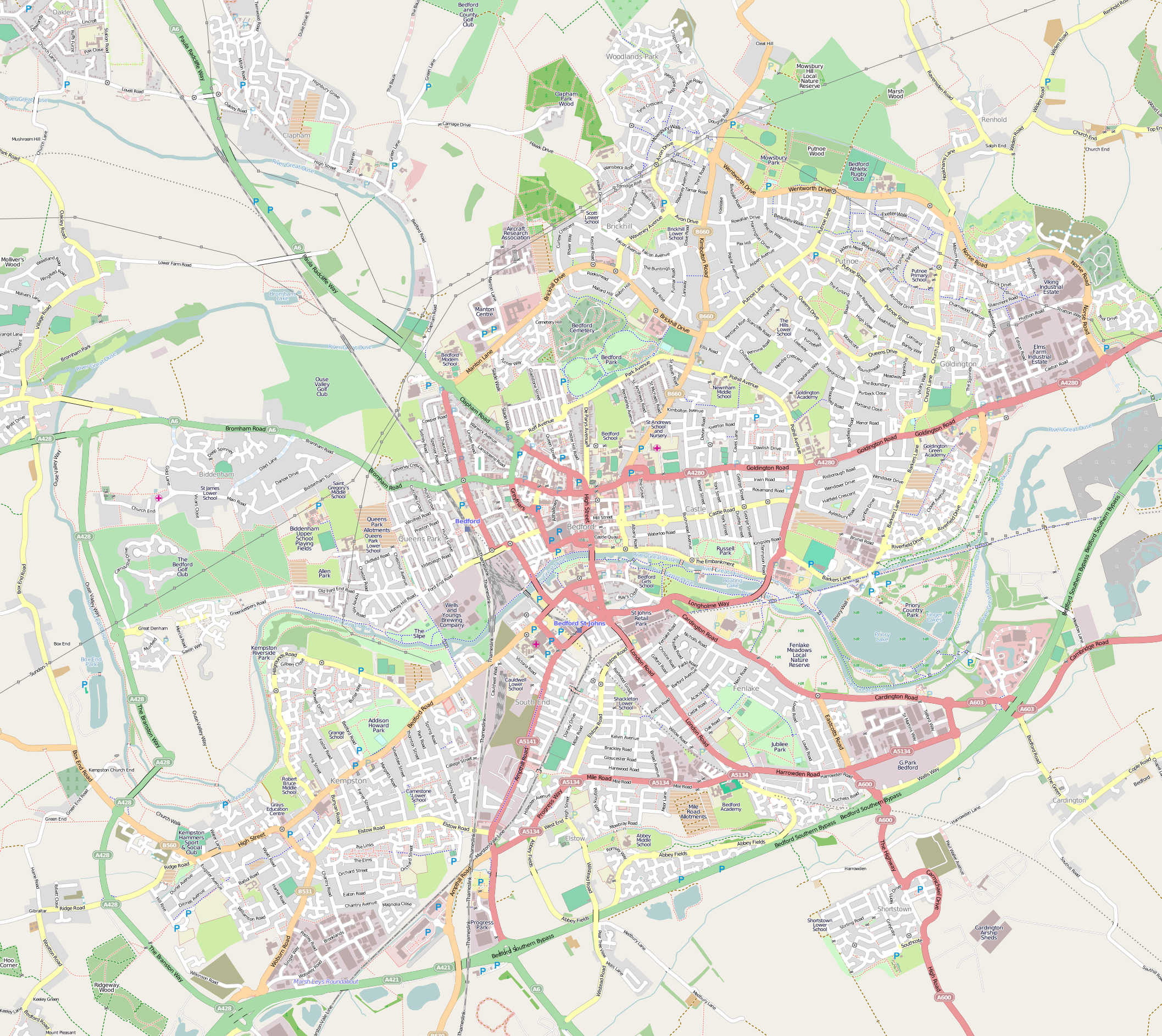
Locations of monastic houses in Bedford

The following is a list of the monastic houses in Bedfordshire, England.

Alien houses are included, as are smaller establishments such as cells and notable monastic granges (particularly those with resident monks), and also camerae of the military orders of monks (Knights Templars and Knights Hospitaller). The numerous monastic hospitals per se are not included here unless at some time the foundation had, or was purported to have the status or function of an abbey, priory, friary or preceptor/commandery.

The name of the county is given where there is reference to an establishment in another county. Where the county has changed since the foundation's dissolution the modern county is given in parentheses, and in instances where the referenced foundation ceased to exist before the unification of England, the kingdom is given, followed by the modern county in parentheses.

Alien houses are included, as are smaller establishments such as cells and notable monastic granges (particularly those with resident monks), and also camerae of the military orders of monks (Knights Templar and Knights Hospitaller). Monastic hospitals are included where they had the status or function of an abbey, priory, or preceptor/commandery.

Abbreviations and key

Status of remains
Symbol	Status
None	Ruins
*	Current monastic function
^{+}	Current non-monastic ecclesiastic function (including remains incorporated into later structure)
^	Current non-ecclesiastic function (including remains incorporated into later structure) or redundant intact structure
^{$}	Remains limited to earthworks etc.
^{#}	No identifiable trace of the monastic foundation remains
^{~}	Exact site of monastic foundation unknown
^{≈}	Identification ambiguous or confused

Locations with names in italics indicate possible duplication (misidentification with another location) or non-existent foundations (either erroneous reference or proposed foundation never implemented) or ecclesiastical establishments with a monastic name but lacking actual monastic connection.

Trusteeship
EH	English Heritage
LT	Landmark Trust
NT	National Trust

Foundation	Image	Communities and provenance	Formal name or dedication and alternative names	References and location
Beadlow Priory ^{$}		Benedictine monks — from Milbrook dependent on St Albans, Hertfordshire founded 1140/6 by Henry d'Albini; abandoned 1435, reverted to the Crown, the buildings falling into decay thereafter	Saint Mary Magdalen ____________________; Beaulieu Priory	^{&} 52°02′01″N 0°23′23″W
Bedford Greyfriars ^{#}		Franciscan Friars Minor, Conventual (under the custody of Oxford); founded 1238 by Mabilea de Plateshull; dissolved c.1539; granted to John Gostwyke	Saint Francis	52°08′20″N 0°28′29″W
Bedford Abbey ^{#}		Benedictine monks founded before 971; ceased to exist decades before 1066 (possibly destroyed in raids by the Danes 1010);		52°07′46″N 0°28′03″W
Bedford Priory ^{+}		secular canons collegiate founded before 1066; Augustinian Canons Regular founded c.1165-6 by Simon Beauchamp; transferred to new site at Newnham c.1080; current parish church of St Paul built on site from 14th century		52°08′08″N 0°28′03″W
Bushmead Priory ^		Augustinian Canons Regular founded 1195 by Hugh Beauchamp; dissolved 1536; granted to Sir William Gascoign; refectory incorporated into mansion built on site; (EH)	The Priory Church of Saint Mary, Bushmead ____________________; Bissemede Priory	^{,} 52°14′01″N 0°22′03″W
Caldwell Priory ^{#}		Augustinian Canons Regular — Holy Sepulchre founded c.1154 (1153) (early in the reign of Henry II, or during that of Stephen) by Simon Basket (Note: Caldwell Priory — founder Simon Basket: Dugdale, Monasticon Anglicanum p.382) (Barescote?), Alderman of Bedford, or a member of the Barescote family (Note: Caldwell Priory — foundation in the reign of Henry II or Stephen, founder unknown: Victoria County History: A History of the County of Bedford: Volume 1 p.382), or between 1199 and 1216 (during the reign of John): land granted by Robert of Houghton, confirmed by Henry III, or between 1199 and 1216 (during the reign of John): land granted by Robert of Houghton, confirmed by Henry III (Note: Caldwell Priory — grant of land by Robert, son of William de Houton and confirmation by Henry III: Dugdale, Monasticon Anglicanum Vol2, p.158 and Cobbett, List of Abbeys, Priories, Nunneries, etc. p.41); Augustinian Canons Regular before c.1280; dissolved 1536; granted to Thomas Leigh c.1562	The Priory Church of Saint John the Baptist at Caldwell ____________________; Cauldwell Priory	52°07′46″N 0°28′36″W
Chicksands Priory ^		Gilbertine Canons and Canonesses — double house founded c. 1150 (1147) by Pain de Beauchamp and his wife, Rose (Roese/Roais) (Note: Chicksands Priory — foundation c.1150: Victoria County History: A History of the County of Bedford: Volume 1 and Dugdale, Monasticon Anglicanum) or c.1154 (Note: Chicksands Priory — foundation c.1154: Knowles, Religious Houses of Medieval England (1940), however Henry Murdac, Archbishop of York (who died 1153) witnessed the first charter); dissolved 1538; granted to London grocer Richard Snow; cloisters incorporated into private house; Crown Property 1936; in grounds of Military base to 1995; restored by MOD 1997–8	Saint Mary ____________________; Chicksand Priory	52°02′27″N 0°21′59″W
Dunstable Blackfriars ^{#}		Dominican Friars (under the Visitation of Cambridge) founded 1259 at the invitation of King Henry III and his consort; dissolved before 8 May 1539		51°52′59″N 0°31′17″W
Dunstable Priory ^{+}		Augustinian Canons Regular founded 1131 (or before 1125?) by Henry I; dissolved 1540; granted to Sir Leonard Chamberlayne nave of church now in parochial use	The Priory Church of Saint Peter, Dunstable ____________________; Dunstaple Priory	51°53′10″N 0°31′04″W
Elstow Abbey ^{+}		Benedictine nuns founded 1078 by Judith, niece of William the Conqueror; dissolved 1539; granted to Sir Humphrey Radcliff c.1553; nave now in use as parish church	The Abbey Church of Saint Mary and Saint Helena, Elstow	52°06′54″N 0°28′10″W
Grovebury Priory ^{#}, Leighton Buzzard		Fontévrault Benedictine monks and nuns, double house alien house: cell dependent on Fontévrault manor granted after 1164 by Henry II; founded after 1189; conventual house possibly never properly established, becoming a chapel with resident chaplains and manor with rental tenants; occasional royal residence; dissolved 1414; farmhouse built on site	La Grave Priory; Leighton Buzzard Priory; Grovesbury Priory	51°54′14″N 0°39′35″W
Hardwick Preceptory ^{#}		Knights Hospitaller founded before(?) 1279 dissolved before(?) 1489		52°05′05″N 0°29′53″W
Harrold Priory ^{#}		Augustinian Canonesses — Arroasian under protection and guidance of (possibly lay) brothers (see immediately below) alien house: daughter house of Arrouaise, Normandy founded 1138 by Sampson le Forte; ceded to Great Missenden, Buckinghamshire 1177; Augustinian Canonesses became denizen: independent from 1188; dissolved 1536; granted to William Lord Parr site occupied by farmhouse and a mansion named 'Harrold Hall', built 1608–1610	The Priory Church of the Blessed Virgin Mary and Saint Peter, Harrold ____________________; Harwood Priory	52°11′58″N 0°36′20″W
Harrold Priory Cell ^{~}		Augustinian Canons Regular — Arroasian (or possibly lay-brothers (Note: Harrold Priory Cell — Victoria County History: A History of the County of Bedford: Volume 1 asserts canons, whilst communications and references from J. C. Dickinson say they were lay brothers rather than canons)) attached to the nunnery (see immediately above) founded c.1136-8; dissolved before 1181		
Leighton Buzzard Cell ^{#}		Cistercian monks cell or grange? dependent on Woburn; founded before 1159		51°54′57″N 0°39′46″W
Markyate Priory	See List of monastic houses in Hertfordshire			
Melchbourne Preceptory		Knights Hospitaller founded before 1176 by Lady Alice de Claremonte, Countess of Pembroke; dissolved 1486; held by the prior of England from 1489, de facto losing its status as a preceptory; granted to John, Earl of Bedford 1550/1; restored to the Knights by Queen Mary	Melchbourne Priory; Melchburn Preceptory; Mechelburn Preceptory	52°16′17″N 0°29′33″W
Millbrook Priory ^{#}		Benedictine monks priory cell dependent on St Albans, Hertfordshire; founded 1097-1119: church granted to St Albans by Nigel de Waste; transferred to (/merged with) Beadlow 1143; dissolved 1140–6	Saint Michael ____________________; Millbrook Cell	52°02′10″N 0°31′26″W
Newnham Priory ^{#}		Augustinian Canons Regular — from Bedford Priory (collegiate church of St Paul) (community founded at Bedford c.1165) transferred here c.1180; dissolved 1540; granted to Urian Brereton 1540/1	Saint Paul ____________________; Newenham Priory; Newenham by Bedford Priory	52°08′27″N 0°26′42″W (approx)
Pulloxhill Grange		Augustinian Canons Regular grange of Dunstable; dissolved; granted to Sir William Pagett 1547		51°59′40″N 0°27′12″W
Ruxox Cell		Augustinian Canons Regular cell/chapel for retired brothers from Dunstable; founded before 1189; dissolved after 1290	chapel dedicated to St Nicholas ____________________; Rokesac	52°00′45″N 0°28′32″W
Turvey Abbey *		Benedictine nuns extant; adjacent to Benedictine monastery	The Priory of Our Lady of Peace	52°09′42″N 0°37′06″W
Turvey monastery *		Benedictine monks founded 1980; extant; adjacent to Benedictine Abbey	The Monastery of Christ our Saviour	52°09′41″N 0°37′09″W
Warden Abbey ^{#}		Cistercian monks founded 1136 by Walter Espec; dissolved (surrendered by the abbot and monks) 4 December 1538; Elizabethan house built on site (of which exist only remnants) renovated 1974; (LT)	The Abbey Church of the Blessed Virgin Mary, Old Warden ____________________; St Mary de Sartis Abbey; Old Warden Abbey; Wardon Abbey	52°04′54″N 0°22′00″W
Woburn Abbey ^{#}		Cistercian monks daughter house of Fountains, Yorkshire founded 28 May 1145 by Hugh de Bolebec; dissolved 1538; granted to John Lord Russell 1547/8 site now occupied by a mansion, estate and safari park	The Abbey Church of the Blessed Virgin Mary, Woburn Abbey	51°58′58″N 0°35′43″W

== See also ==
- List of monastic houses in England

== Bibliography ==
- Binns, Alison (1989) Studies in the History of Medieval Religion 1: Dedications of Monastic Houses in England and Wales 1066–1216, Boydell
- Cobbett, William (1868) List of Abbeys, Priories, Nunneries, Hospitals, And Other Religious Foundations in England and Wales and in Ireland, Confiscated, Seized On, or Alienated by the Protestant "Reformation" Sovereigns and Parliaments
- Knowles, David & Hadcock, R. Neville (1971) Medieval Religious Houses England & Wales. Longman
- Morris, Richard (1979) Cathedrals and Abbeys of England and Wales, J. M. Dent & Sons Ltd.
- Thorold, Henry (1986) Collins Guide to Cathedrals, Abbeys and Priories of England and Wales, Collins
- Thorold, Henry (1993) Collins Guide to the Ruined Abbeys of England, Wales and Scotland, Collins
- Wright, Geoffrey N., (2004) Discovering Abbeys and Priories, Shire Publications Ltd.
- English Cathedrals and Abbeys, Illustrated, Odhams Press Ltd.
- Map of Monastic Britain, South Sheet, Ordnance Survey, 2nd edition, 1954
