= Greyfriars, Bedford =

Coordinates: 52.1388484°N 0.4748422°W

Greyfriars was a monastic house in Bedford, England. The house of the Grey Friars (or Franciscan friars) was founded either by Mabilea de Plateshull (Lady Mabel de Pattishall) (according to Leland) or John St. John (according to Valor Ecclesiasticus) during the reign of King Edward II. Their church was dedicated on 3 November 1295, well before Edward II's reign, though the original foundation may have been as early as 1238. The date of the arrival of the Franciscans in the town is not known. The friary was enlarged in 1310 on land donated by the townspeople and the nuns of Harrold Priory.

The revenue of the friary was valued at £3 13s. 2d (according to Valor Ecclesiasticus, or £5 per year according to William Cobbett) at the time of the Dissolution of the Monasteries. The friars formally acknowledged the supremacy of the King on 14 May 1534, and the deed of surrender was dated 3 October 1538, signed by the warden, the vice-warden and ten friars. In 1539 the property was granted to John Gostwyke.

== Burials ==
- John de Mowbray, 3rd Baron Mowbray
- Mabel de Grandison, wife of John de Pateshull

== See also ==
- List of monastic houses in Bedfordshire
