= Church of St Peter & St Paul, Flitwick =

Church in Flitwick, Bedfordshire, England

Coordinates: 51.9970°N 0.5022°W

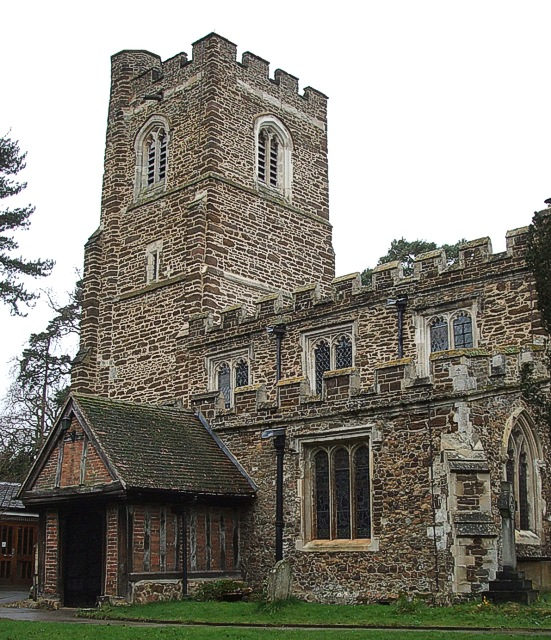
Tower and porch

The Church of St Peter & St Paul is the Church of England parish church in Flitwick, Bedfordshire, England. It became a Grade I listed building on 23 January 1961.

== History ==
It is likely that a wooden church and then a Saxon stone once stood on the same site. The current church was built in the 12th century and in the 14th century the south aisle was added. The nave clerestory and timber-framed porch were added in either the late 15th or early 16th century. The monks of the Ruxox Cell acted as priest for the church until the Dissolution of the Monasteries when the abbot of Dunstable Priory surrendered to the king.

Rebuilding in 1835 included the dismantling and reassembly of the Norman doorway in the north wall of the nave. During the second half of the 19th century further restoration was undertaken including a new roof on the chancel.

The chapter house was added in 1983.

The parish and benefice of Flitwick is within the Diocese of St Albans.

== Architecture ==
The ironstone building has ashlar dressings and clay tile roofs. It consists of the chancel, nave with north and south aisles, south porch, and vestry on the north side. The three-stage west tower is supported by buttresses and has an embattled parapet. The tower has a ring of seven bells, five of which date from the seventeenth century.

The font is Norman and has a circular fluted bowl. The pulpit is part of what was originally a three-decker.

The memorials in the church include one to the men of Flitwick who died in World War I and World War II.

== See also ==
- Grade I listed buildings in Bedfordshire
