= Caldwell Priory =

Priory of Canons of the Holy Sepulcher

Coordinates: 52.12944°N 0.47649°W

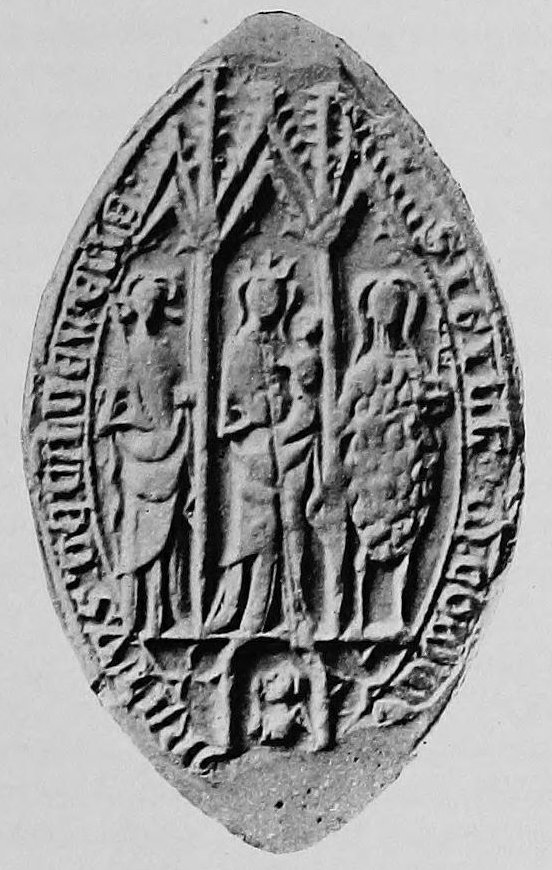
- Seal of the Priory of Caldwell
- Interactive map of Caldwell Priory

Monastery information
- Order: Canons of the Holy Sepulchre, Augustinians
- Established: 1154
- Disestablished: 1536

Site
- Location: Bedford, Bedfordshire, England

Caldwell Priory was a priory of Canons of the Holy Sepulchre in Bedfordshire, England, from c. 1154 to 1536. It was situated in the south-west of Bedford on the south bank of the River Great Ouse.

== History ==
=== Origins ===
The origin of the priory of Caldwell is somewhat obscure. Its earliest charters of endowment are of the reign of Henry II, but undated; but as a prior of Caldwell witnessed a charter granted by Robert de Brus, 2nd Lord of Annandale to Harrold during the lifetime of Malcolm IV of Scotland (1153–65), it may be concluded that this house, like so many others in Bedfordshire, was founded early in the reign of Henry II or perhaps in that of Stephen. The founder's name is unknown. The Close Roll of 13 Edward III speaks only of 'the ancestors of Simon Barescote of Bedford'; Leland, by naming Simon Barescote in one place, and in another assigning the foundation to the Beauchamps or the Beaumonts, shows that there were several contradictory traditions in existence in his time. The priory belonged at first to the Canons of the Holy Sepulchre and was dedicated to St. John Baptist, but after the thirteenth century it probably ceased to be in any way distinguished from the other Augustinian houses. The Canons of the Holy Sepulchre differed from other Augustinians only in name and the scarlet badge on their cloaks; they likely followed the same rule, as on two occasions, canons of Dunstable Priory were invited to be priors of Caldwell, while it was still called by the name of the Holy Cross.

Four churches in Bedfordshire – Bromham, Roxton, Sandy and Oakley with the chapel of Clapham – belonged to Caldwell at the beginning of the thirteenth century; Marsworth and Broughton in Buckinghamshire, and Arnesby in Leicestershire before 1291; Tolleshunt Major in Essex at a later date. Its temporal possessions lay for the most part within the county of Bedford, and were never very extensive; in 1291, they were worth less than £50.

At the siege of Bedford Castle in 1224, the canons assisted the king by providing him with materials for mangonels and received in return a share of the stones from the dismantled walls. At this time, as well as later, they seem to have been on friendly terms with the canons of Dunstable. It was by the advice of the prior of Dunstable, amongst others, that Prior Eudo of Caldwell resigned and fled to the Cistercians of Merivale, before the visitation of Bishop Grossetête; and the sub-prior of Dunstable took his place. The reason why he was afraid of the visitation is not stated, only that he was 'accused by many'; he had only been prior for five years, and during his term of office had been sent by the pope to settle a dispute as far away as Yorkshire.

In 1287, there seems to have been some uncertainty about the advowson of the priory, and the election of John of Yprès was hurried to prevent any claim being made.

In the year 1339, at the death of Prior Roger of Wellington (or Wymington) the king's escheator seized the lands of the priory; partly on the ground of a rumour that in the time of Henry III the advowson had been taken into the king's hand, and partly because the prior held two carucates of land and a rent of 100s. Within Bedford town, and held in fee farm of the king. The canons however appealed to the king himself, who thereupon wrote to the escheator to molest them no further, saying that he had heard from the present prior that Simon de Barescote, whose ancestors founded the priory, gave the advowson to Roger the Marshal, and he to William le Latimer; and that thus it had descended to Robert de Ufford and his wife who then held it.

=== Finances ===
The original endowment of the priory cannot be exactly stated, as the foundation charter is not in existence. Robert of Houghton granted to the canons the site of the priory in 1272; and in 1336 they held lands and tenements in Bedford, Bromham, Milton, Colesden, Roxton, Chalverston, Sandy, Sutton, Potton, Thurleigh, Holwell, Felmersham and Shelton. The churches held by the priory in 1291 were Oakley with Clapham, Roxton, Bromham, Sandy, with Marsworth and Broughton in Buckinghamshire and Arnesby in Leicestershire. In 1535, they still remained in its gift, except Broughton and Sandy; Tolleshunt Major in Essex was added. In 1302, the prior of Caldwell held half a knight's fee in Chawston and small portions in Milton Ernest and Eaton; in 1346, the same half-fee; and until 1346, he held also one quarter of a knight's fee in Edlesborough in Buckinghamshire. The first report of the Crown bailiff gives a total of £134 15s. 8½d., including the demesne lands of the priory, the manor of Shelton and divers parcels of land in the counties of Bedford, Warwick, Northampton, Leicester, and the rectories of Clapham, Oakley, Roxton-cum-Colesden, Bromham, Marsworth, Arnesby and Tolleshunt Major.

The churches belonging to the priory were not very wealthy, and sometimes they proved a source of expense rather than of revenue. The chapel of Clapham in their county, and the church of Marsworth in Buckinghamshire, must have cost the canons a good deal of money. A part of the tithes from both of these had been granted to Osney Abbey at its foundation, amounting to a pension of 12 marks; and from the first, the canons of Caldwell seem to have made efforts to escape this payment. In 1279 they had to be ordered to pay it 'on pain of excommunication'; but in the beginning of the fourteenth century Hugh de Beauchamp, who was prior at the time, began a long series of suits with Osney on the same subject. He was seemingly unsuccessful, for this pension was still reckoned among the liabilities of the priory in 1535. It was probably the pressure of poverty at this particular time that stirred the prior to make these efforts; he was then rebuilding the conventual church, and only a few years before Bishop Dalderby had granted a licence to the canons to beg alms for this purpose, as they were so poor. Several chantries were granted at about the same time.

The priory did not grow any richer as time went on. In 1318 the canons parted with the advowson of Broughton church to the dean and chapter of Lincoln; and in 1525 with that of Sandy to Bishop Longland and his brother. The bishop wrote of it in the same year as 'a very poor place,' and said that instead of the £100 which the king had asked for in his letter, he had only instructed the prior to contribute £20 towards the loan which was being collected from all the religious houses.

=== Visitations ===
The visitation of Bishop Grossetête in 1249, when Prior Eudo fled to the Cistercians, has been already alluded to. Bishop Buckingham visited the house in 1387 and reminded the canons, according to the custom of a visitation, of the duties of obedience, silence, assistance in choir, and proper administration of the goods of the monastery. He laid special stress on the necessity of instructing the younger canons in song and in grammar, that they might be fit to perform the divine office. They were forbidden under pain of imprisonment and excommunication to enter taverns in Bedford, or to visit the monastery of Elstow.

Bishop Repingdon repeated these injunctions not to go to Bedford, or to the abbey of Elstow on any pretext whatever; and one of the canons was forbidden to go outside the cloister at all. The canons generally were not to drink anywhere but in the prior's presence, which seems to imply some laxity in this respect.

When Bishop Grey visited the priory he found John Wymington, the brother whom Bishop Repingdon had ordered to keep within the cloister, holding the office of sub-prior; he had now to be deposed. There is nothing special in the injunctions of this time which might point to laxity; the bishop only said that the canons were not to go to Bedford, that hunting dogs were not to be kept in the monastery, and that the common seal was to be kept under lock and key. And it seems that Bishop Longland accused the house of no worse fault than poverty.

=== Dissolution ===
The prior, Thomas Dey, with six canons and two lay brothers, subscribed to the Royal Supremacy in 1535; and as the house had an income of only £109 8s. 5d. clear, it was surrendered under the Dissolution of the Lesser Monasteries Act in 1536.

=== After the dissolution ===
After the dissolution, the 306-acre (1.24 km^{2}) site and buildings were leased out, until being sold in 1563 for £404. The priory buildings appear to have lasted into the nineteenth century, but were replaced sometime between 1818 and 1857 by a new house. That house was demolished some time between 1926 and 1967. The site was then used for some years by an iron and steel company, and in contemporary times is a mix of housing and brownfield land.

== Priors of Caldwell ==
- Osbert, occurs 1178 and 1186
- Hugh, occurs 1200–1
- Alexander, elected 1212, died 1229
- William, elected 1229, died 1244
- Eudo, elected 1244, resigned 1249
- Walter of Caddington, elected 1249, resigned 1272
- Matthew of Bedford, elected 1272, resigned 1287
- John of Yprès, elected 1287, resigned 1313
- John de Lacu, elected 1303, died 1318
- Hugh de Beauchamp, elected 1318, resigned 1326
- Roger of Wymington, elected 1326, occurs 1332
- Robert of Lufwyk, resigned 1338
- William of Souldrop, elected 1338, resigned 1348
- Richard of Hardwick, elected 1348, died 1349
- Ralph of Derby, elected 1349, died 1375
- Thomas de Stratford, elected 1375, died 1396
- Ralph Portreeve, elected 1396, resigned 1397
- Thomas Pollard, elected 1397, died or resigned 1420
- Thomas Bole, elected 1420, occurs 1425
- John Ampthill, occurs 1437
- John Bedford, resigned 1479
- Richard Derby, elected 1479
- Thomas Cople, elected 1492, resigned 1509
- Robert Hanslape, elected 1509, resigned 1525
- John Biggleswade, elected 1525, died 1531
- Thomas Dey, elected 1531

== Common seal ==
The common seal of the priory represented the Blessed Virgin Mary crowned, and standing with the holy Child in her arms; on the right St. John the Baptist, on the left St. John the Evangelist; the prior kneeling below.

== See also ==
- List of monastic houses in Bedfordshire

== Notes ==
- This article is based on The Priory of Caldwell, in The Victoria History of the County of Bedford: Volume 1, 1904
