= Harrold Priory =

Disestablished English priory

Coordinates: 52.19945°N 0.60547°W

Monastery information
- Other names: Harwood Priory
- Order: Augustinian
- Established: 1138
- Disestablished: 1536
- Mother house: Arrouaise Abbey
- Controlled churches: The Priory Church of the Blessed Virgin Mary and Saint Peter, Harrold

Site
- Location: Harrold, Borough of Bedford, Bedfordshire, England
- Country: United Kingdom
- Visible remains: none

Harrold Priory was a priory in Harrold, Bedfordshire, England. It was established in 1138 and disestablished in 1536.

== History ==
The priory of Harrold was probably founded on land which was then a part of the honour of Huntingdon, and held by Sampson le Fort of the Scottish kings. The site of the priory with the churches of St. Peter, Harrold, and Brayfield (Northants) was originally granted to Gervase, abbot of St. Nicholas of Arrouaise, that he might send there some nuns of his order: they were at first governed by a prior, with a few canons, to protect or guide the sisters 'according to the institutions of St. Nicholas of Arrouaise.' The priory has some distinguished names amongst its earlier benefactors. Sampson le Fort's charter was probably confirmed first by David I of Scotland and his son Henry, Earl of Huntingdon, and certainly afterwards by Malcolm IV, William the Lion, Simon, Earl of Northampton, and Robert Bruce; while Baldwin des Ardres, Count of Guisnes, granted to the nuns the church of Stevington before 1153, and the name of Roger de Quincy, constable of Scotland, appears later.

Before the year 1181 however the prior and canons had ceased to exist, and the nuns were making efforts to free themselves from immediate subjection to the abbot of Arrouaise; and after appeals from both parties to Pope Alexander III the matter was finally referred to the arbitration of Hugh of Lincoln. Robert of Bedford, the precentor of the cathedral, was sent to treat with the abbot of Missenden, who was acting as proctor to the abbot of Arrouaise; and the result of his negotiations was that Gervase set the nuns free for ever from subjection to the parent abbey, and yielded to them the two churches of Harrold and Brayfield, with all the other gifts of Sampson le Fort, on condition that they paid half a mark yearly to the abbot of Missenden. Thenceforward until the dissolution the convent was ruled by a prioress, having sometimes a warden or master, like other small houses of nuns, and at one time a few lay brothers. Of the number of the nuns there is no indication until the very end, when there were only six at the outside. Nor is it easy to discover whether in giving up their direct connection with the abbey of Arrouaise, they ceased at once to observe the Arrouasian rule and to wear the habit of that order; or whether, as seems more likely, the change was later. At the dissolution they were reckoned as ordinary Austin canonesses. The house has very little history of any kind. The chartulary in the British Museum, which contains an abstract of the charters in the possession of the priory in the reign of Henry V, shows various small grants of lands and tenements in Bedfordshire, and a few suits concerning churches. The latest item of importance is an account of the impropriation of the church of Shakerstone in 1416. Early in the thirteenth century the advowson of the priory was probably held by Ralf Morin of Harrold and his son John, and in 1279 certainly by Sir John de Grey. The name of Sir Gerard Braybrook occurs frequently in some later charters. The last patron of all was Lord Mordaunt of Turvey, one of whose ancestors had witnessed a foundation charter of the priory. The house was probably never very rich, though no exact statement of its income can be made earlier than the dissolution.

During the time of Bishop Sutton, in 1298, a nun of Harrold was found guilty of a breach of her vow of chastity; and in 1311 Bishop Dalderby issued a commission for the visitation and correction of this house amongst others. No account of this visitation is preserved, nor are any others recorded; only in 1369 Bishop Gynwell appointed Dame Katherine of Tutbury (afterwards prioress) to administer the revenues of the priory during vacancy, and to reform excesses. It may be that during her term of office the house was well governed, and had a better reputation; but this is of course mere conjecture. The name of this prioress and her successor, Emma Drakelowe, are found in many of the charters relating to tenements and leases in the chartulary. Nothing further is known of the state of the priory, internal or external, until it was visited by Richard Layton in 1535, with other houses in Bedfordshire. If the accusations contained in his letter to Thomas Cromwell were true, the priory had certainly ceased to be in any real sense a religious house. He declared that he found there a prioress and four or five nuns, of whom one had 'two fair children' and another 'one child and no more'; and also describes how Lord Mordaunt had induced the prioress and her 'foolish young flock' to break open the coffer containing the charters of the priory, and to seal a writing in Latin of which they did not understand a word, but were told it was merely the lease of an impropriate benefice. 'All say they durst not say him nay,' he adds; 'and the prioress saith plainly that she would never consent thereto.'

In the case of Chicksand, which is charged with similar misdoings in the same letter, the very form and content of the accusation challenge criticism at once. But if the charges laid against Harrold are denied, it can only be on the simple ground that Layton is a discredited witness. There is no actual evidence for or against his statements. But unhappily there is nothing at all improbable in the story of Lord Mordaunt and the charters. The patron of a house so small and so poor would be in a position to take a very high hand with the little convent, especially as one or two of the nuns would very likely be members of his own family. However this may be, the house was certainly dissolved under the Suppression of Religious Houses Act 1535, and a pension of £7 assigned to the prioress, Elinor Warren.

The priory was endowed by Sampson le Fort with the churches of St. Peter, Harrold, and Brayfield, Northants, with their appurtenances, and a few acres of land besides. The church of Stevington was added soon after, and that of Shakerstone (Leicester) in the fifteenth century. No statement can be made as to the value of its lands in the thirteenth century, as it is not mentioned at all in the Taxatio of Pope Nicholas, nor in the Feudal Aids. The total income of the priory in 1535 was £40 18s. 2d.; the first valuation after the dissolution, in 1536, amounted to £57 10s., including the four rectories mentioned above, with small parcel of land, rents and tenements in the counties of Bedford, Huntingdon and Buckingham.

Harrold Hall was built on the site by Francis Farrar between 1608 and 1610.

== Prioresses of Harrold ==
The prioresses of Harrold were:

- Agnes died 1245
- Basile de la Legh, elected 1245, occurs 1252
- Juliane
- Amice, occurs 1264 and 1268
- Margery of Hereford, resigned 1304
- Cecily de Cantia, elected 1304
- Petronilla of Radwell, elected 1335, resigned 1354
- Christine Murdak, elected 1354, resigned 1357
- Maud de Tichemersh, elected 1357, occurs 1364
- Katherine of Tutbury, elected 1369, occurs 1384
- Emma Drakelowe, occurs 1405 and 1413
- Elizabeth Chiltern, resigned 1470
- Margaret Pycard, elected 1470
- Helen Crabbe, died 1501
- Eleanor Pygot, elected 1501, died 1509
- Agnes Gascoigne, elected 1509
- Elinor Warren, surrendered 1536

== Common seal ==
:The seal of the priory represented St. Peter, standing, in mitre and chasuble, two keys in the right hand and a crosier in the left. The legend is very indistinct, only the last two words being legible: . . . PETRI CATENAS.

== See also ==
- List of monastic houses in Bedfordshire

== Notes ==
- This article is based on The Priory of Harrold, in The Victoria History of the County of Bedford: Volume 1, 1904
