= Adam Croft =

British writer

- Born: Dunstable, United Kingdom
- Writing career
- Genres: Crime, thriller, mystery
- Notable works: Knight & Culverhouse, Kempston Hardwick mysteries

Adam Croft is an English crime fiction writer. He is a self-published author and is an advocate of independent publishing.

== Work ==
=== Writing ===
Croft has written more than 20 books, including the Knight & Culverhouse, crime thrillers and Kempston Hardwick mysteries. He appeared on the USA Today bestseller list twice, with the Kempston Hardwick box set and his 2015 psychological thriller Her Last Tomorrow. Her Last Tomorrow has sold around 150,000 units so far in the UK, around 500,000 including international sales, and was on track to sell more than £1M worth of books in 2017. He has also had several plays published with Lazy Bee Scripts.

An advocate of self-publishing, Croft has spoken out about what he sees as the negative sides of traditional publishing. In 2012, he denounced crime novelist Sue Grafton for calling self-published authors "lazy".

He was awarded an Honorary Doctorate of Arts by the University of Bedfordshire in March 2018 "in recognition of his outstanding services to literature".

In 2020, he announced he was launching a new crime series set in Rutland.

== Personal life ==
Adam Croft lives in Flitwick, Bedfordshire.

== Bibliography ==
Knight & Culverhouse

- Too Close for Comfort (2011)
- Guilty as Sin (2011)
- Jack Be Nimble (2015)
- Rough Justice (2015)
- In Too Deep (2016)
- In the Name of the Father (2016)
- With A Vengeance (2017)
- Dead & Buried (2018)
- In Plain Sight (2019)
- Snakes & Ladders (2021)

Rutland crime series

- What Lies Beneath (2020)
- On Borrowed Time (2020)
- In Cold Blood (28 May 2021)
- Kiss of Death (2022)
- Moment of Truth (2022)
- No Way Out (2024)

Kempston Hardwick Mysteries

- Exit Stage Left (2011)
- The Westerlea House Mystery (2013)
- Death Under the Sun (2014)
- The Thirteenth Room (2015)
- The Wrong Man (2019)

Psychological thrillers

- Her Last Tomorrow (2015)
- Only the Truth (2017)
- In Her Image (2017)
- Tell Me I'm Wrong (2018)
- The Perfect Lie (2019)
- Closer To You (2020)

Sam Barker

- Absolution (2019)
- Betrayal (2020)

Short stories

- Gone (2016)
- Love You To Death (2017)
- The Harder They Fall (2017)

Plays

- Sleeping Dogs (2014)
- Curtain Up! (2015)
- Home, Sweet Home (2015)
