= Millbrook Priory =

Former priory in Bedfordshire, England

- Location within Bedfordshire Location within the United Kingdom

Monastery information
- Established: 1097
- Disestablished: 1143

Site
- Location: Bedfordshire
- Country: England
- Coordinates: 52.03598°N 0.523911°W

Millbrook Priory was a priory in Bedfordshire, England. It was established in 1097 and disestablished in 1143.

The little Priory of Beaulieu at Moddry, owned land at Millbrook, where originally a small cell had been founded by Nigel de Wast, as a cell of St. Albans, but when Beaulieu was founded, as a cell of St. Albans, the two cells, Beaulieu and Millbrook, were amalgamated.

== See also ==
- List of monastic houses in Bedfordshire
