= Elstow Abbey =

Abbey in Elstow, Bedfordshire, England

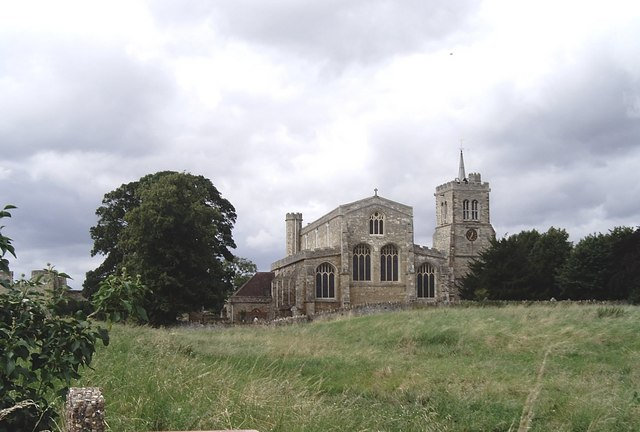
- Interactive map of Elstow Abbey

Monastery information
- Full name: The Abbey Church of St Mary and St Helena, Elstow
- Order: Benedictine
- Established: c.1075
- Disestablished: 1539

People
- Founders: Judith, niece of William the Conqueror

Architecture
- Status: Parish church
- Heritage designation: Grade I listed building

Site
- Location: Elstow, Bedfordshire, England
- Coordinates: 52.11495°N 0.46935°W
- Visible remains: church
- Public access: yes

Elstow Abbey was a monastery for Benedictine nuns in Elstow, Bedfordshire, England. It was founded c.1075 by Judith, Countess of Huntingdon, a niece of William the Conqueror, and therefore is classed as a royal foundation. The current remain in a smaller extent and is now a parish church.

== History ==
The modern church dedicated to St Mary and St Helen used to extend eastwards for some considerable distance, and contained a central tower, chancel, and Lady chapel. The foundation stones still reportedly cause much trouble to the sexton, though he sometimes unearths beautiful tiles from the old chancel floor.

The monastery was known to have been involved in numerous lawsuits, with an array of monasteries including that of Dunstable Priory, Newhouse and St Albans Abbey, concerning the advowson of various parishes. The nuns often appear to have resorted to aggressive behaviour. There was further trouble in the 14th century when the nearby hospital of St Leonard needed to close and divert a footpath used by the abbey, for the purpose of building construction. The abbess objected and even following a lawsuit in which the abbey lost, they still prevented the work for a further two years until the hospital successfully sought intervention by the Crown, obtaining letters patent.

Further incidents followed:

In 1337 Elizabeth Morteyn, who was then abbess, claimed the 'third penny' from the town of Bedford, in virtue of an alleged grant from Malcolm IV, King of Scotland; the case was carried before Parliament, and the burgesses were successful in proving that Malcolm never had any lordship in the town.

There were numerous reports and complaints of unorthodox behaviour, with a visiting bishop commenting that there was 'too much wandering of the nuns out of the monastery.' Also, as many of the nuns and usually the abbess came from high ranking families, they had friends at court who often visited and even stayed in the monastery purely for social reasons. Some 'secular' women even seem to have been living in the monastery and eventually Bishop Gynwell ordered that none were to stay except those granted a special licence to do so. Even so, in 1379 Bishop Buckingham had to order the abbess to dismiss all secular persons from the monastery.

Various records of subsequent years show that little ever improved and if anything the monastery became increasingly secularised, with the nuns maintaining individual households, dining with friends and wearing secular clothing. Successive attempts at intervention seem to have been unsuccessful and probably ignored.

There used to be a separate Parish Church for the villagers, but this was destroyed about 1500, and the Abbey church was afterwards fitted up for public worship, and dedicated to the Holy Trinity.

== Dissolution and beyond ==
There were twenty-three nuns in residence besides the abbess, Elizabeth Boyvill, when the monastery was closed in 1539, all of whom were then pensioned off. The land then passed to Edmund Harvey.

Following the Dissolution of the Monasteries, the majority of the church nave was blocked off and retained for parish use. The remainder of the church was demolished after 1580. In 1616 Sir Thomas Hillersdon purchased the remaining monastic buildings and incorporated them into a new house, which itself later became a ruin. The church contains some 15th-century brasses, 17th-century and later tombs and furnishings. Another survivor of the monastery is a small vaulted building on the south side of the church, originally a parlour and now used as a vestry.

== Building ==
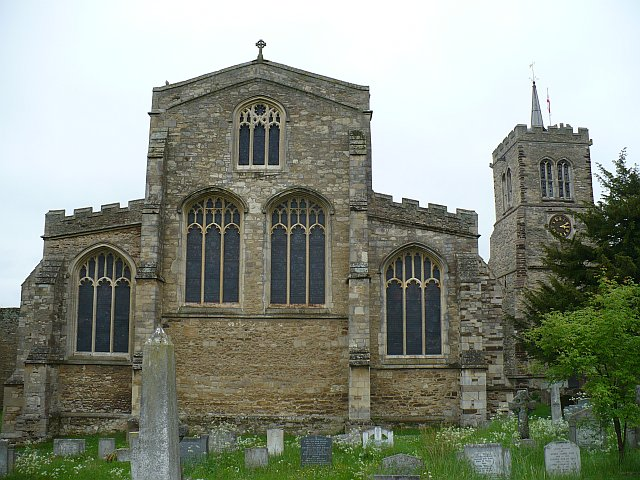

Three bays of the church are Norman, (about 1075); the two western bays are of Early English style, about 1225. In 1539, during the suppression, much was lost. By 1580, the east end had been completed, with a west window, and detached tower. A watercolour by Thomas Fisher (c.1815) shows a timber-framed north porch. From 1823 to 1828, restoration work was done. Around 1860, a vestry on the north side of the church was demolished.

From 1880 to 1882 restoration work was done, by architect Thomas Jobson Jackson. In 1883 and 1885, the John Bunyan stained glass windows by the firm of Camm Brothers were added in the east wall.

It became a listed building on 13 July 1964.

== List of rectors (and abbess) ==
- Roger de Weseham, 1222
- Haumon de Weseham, 1235 (chaplain)
- Alexander de Elnestowe, 1235
- John de Elnestowe, 1247 (subdeacon)
- Hamon
- John, 1259 (chaplain)
- Richard de Salested
- Richard Scot, 21 March 1273 (chaplain)
- M. Matthew de Dunstaple, 17 October 1275 (subdeacon)
- Robert de Welye, 23 September 1284 (clerk)
- Hugh de Suthluffenham, 25 May 1311 (chaplain)
- Thomas de Baumbergh, 26 September 1317 (acolyte)
- William Fincayl, 5 May 1318 (deacon)
- John de Felmersham, 1 August 1324 (acolyte)
- William de Tykhull, 5 May 1325
- M. Robert le Spicer, 24 June 1335
- D. Hugh de Estmarcham, 27 March 1336
- Adam de Brandon, 12 October 1339 (priest)
- Nicholas Holham, 7 December 1340 (priest)
- John Bachelor
- Robert de la Beche, 26 May 1342 (priest)
- Rose Waldegrave, fl. 1452
- John Kyng, 1526 (curate)
- Thomas Blocksley (curate)
- Robert Hundley, 1605 (M.A., curate)
- Robert Twisden, 1612
- Henry Bird, 1617 (vicar)
- John Bellay, 1623 (clerk)
- Andrew Cater, 165? (clerk)
- Christopher Hall, (Vicar)
- David Jerland (Vicar)
- D. Longhorne, 1668
- John Robinson, 1686 (curate)
- Joseph Hobbs, 1696
- John Towersey, 1707
- John Aubrey, 1715
- Robert Phipp
- John Smith, 31 October 1782 (clerk, curate)
- Thomas Cave, 25 April 1806 (clerk, then curate)
- George Hull Bowers, 5 June 1819 (clerk)
- John Wing, 1 May 1832 [clerk, to perpetual curacy, on resignation of G. H. Bowers];
- John Gaskin, 2 February 1849 (M.A.)
- John Henry Augustus Rudd, 29 July 1852 (B.A.)
- James Copner, 4 December 1867 (M.A. on resignation of J. H. A. Rudd)
- George Parker, April 1896
- Charles Frederick Bonney Hawkins, January 1905
- Stanley Victor Hartley, 1920
- Peter Goodwin Hartley, 1953
- Michael James Murfin Norton, 1976
- John Andrew Tibbs, 1983
- Richard William Huband, 1991
- Jeremy R. Crocker, 2003
- Paul Messam, 2016

== See also ==
- Abbeys and priories in England
- List of monastic houses in Bedfordshire
- List of English abbeys, priories and friaries serving as parish churches
- Grade I listed buildings in Bedfordshire

== Sources ==
- 'Houses of Benedictine nuns: The abbey of Elstow', A History of the County of Bedford: Volume 1 (1904), pp. 353–58.
- Anthony New. 'A Guide to the Abbeys of England And Wales', p166-68. Constable.
