= David Flitwick (died 1296) =

13th century English nobleman and member of Parliament

- Arms of de Flitwick:- "argent, 2 lions passant guardant sable"

M.P. for Bedfordshire
- In office 27 Nov 1295 – 1296
- Monarch: Edward I

Personal details
- Born: Flitwick, Bedfordshire
- Died: 1296 Invasion of Scotland?
- Spouse: Lucy
- Children: David Flitwick
- Parent(s): David Flitwick & Hyllaria

David Flitwick (died 1296), of Flitwick, Bedfordshire, was an English politician and soldier of the Anglo-Scots Wars.

== Career and Life ==
Flitwick was summoned to Parliament for the Bedfordshire constituency on 27 November 1295. He died during Edward I's Invasion of Scotland and Edward ordered Flitwick's lands to be seized whilst staying at Roxburgh on 3 June 1296. The Inquisition post mortem held found Flitwick to have been in possession of the manor of Flitwick and wardship of Skipton Castle.

== Family ==
Flitwick was succeeded by his son David Flitwick (1266–1311), who married Lora Gumbaud. The younger Flitwick was succeeded by David Flitwick.
