= Ruxox Cell =

Moated chapel in Bedfordshire, England

Coordinates: 52.012428°N 0.475647°W

Ruxox Cell (sometimes spelled Rokesac) was a moated chapel, or monastic cell, established in the twelfth century in the parish of Flitwick in Bedfordshire, England. Situated on the east side of the village of Ruxox, it was granted to the Augustinian priory of Dunstable by Philip de Sanvill, Lord of Flitwick, c. 1170. The grant was confirmed by William, Earl of Aumale (d. 1189), and his wife, Hawise (d. 1214), who was Countess of Aumale in her own right. It was dedicated to St. Nicholas by Robert de Chesney, bishop of Lincoln (d. 1166). Priors from Dunstable would sometimes retire to Roxux.

Only a few extant documents from the thirteenth century make reference to Ruxox: (a) an old deed in the cartulary of Dunstable, now in the British Library, which mentions Alexander, canon of Ruxox, and contains several grants to the chapel; and (b) the chronicle of Dunstable, which includes a reference to the prior at Ruxox under the year 1205, an account of two friars, Michael de Peck and John de Hallings, and others of the household of Ruxox under the year 1283; and a notice that two of the canons at Ruxox along with Stephen, parson of Flitwick, died and were buried at the site in 1290.

Archaeological excavation at the site has revealed foundations of a wall near the bank of the River Flit, which runs five feet below ground parallel to the river for a short distance before going off at a 45^{o} angle. It is composed of sandstone and other blocks, and partly pinned beneath it is a beam 10 ft. long and 2 ft. wide resting on underlying piles. Remains of Roman roads have been nearby, yet, even though Roman pottery has also been found along the wall, researchers consider the site to be more medieval than Roman primarily due to the re-use of a carved sandstone column base in the wall.

== See also ==
- List of monastic houses in Bedfordshire
