= Beadlow Priory =

Priory in Bedfordshire, England

- Interactive map of Beadlow Priory

Monastery information
- Other name: Beaulieu Priory
- Order: Benedictine
- Established: 1140-1146
- Disestablished: 1435
- Dedication: Mary Magdalene

Site
- Location: Beadlow, Bedfordshire, England
- Coordinates: 52.03391°N 0.39059°W

Beadlow Priory was a monastic foundation established between 1140 and 1146 by Robert D'Albini for a community of Benedictine monks.

== History ==
Around 1140 the lands of Beadlow Manor were granted to the priory at Millbrook in Hertfordshire, from where the community were moved upon the establishment of the new priory at Beadlow, Bedfordshire, England about 10 km south of Bedford. Initially referred to as Beaulieu Priory, it remained cell of the Abbey at St Albans.

Poverty made the community unsustainable and in 1428 the monks left the priory, which became absorbed into St Albans Abbey. In 1434 the ownership of the priory passed to the Crown, whilst the site was finally abandoned as a monastic settlement in 1435.

The decay of the buildings ensued after this time, and by 1908 there existed no intact above-ground remains.

From 1963 to 1965 archaeological excavations unearthed the foundations as well as artifacts dating to the 12th to 15th centuries.

The establishment was close to Chicksands Priory.

The Old Priory House, nearby, was not a part of the priory.

== Priors of Beadlow ==
- Walter de Standon, elected 1233;
- Roger, elected 1237;
- Roger de Thebrugg, elected 1281;
- John of Stopsley, elected 1285;
- John of Stagsden, transferred 1296;
- William de Parys, elected 1296;
- Peter de Maydenford, elected 1299;
- Gregory of Saint Albans, elected 1302;
- Richard of Northampton, elected 1305;
- William of Kirkby, elected 1310, transferred 1312;
- Richard of Hertford, elected 1312;
- Henry of Saint Neots, elected 1316;
- Adam of Newark, elected 1340;
- John of Caldwell, elected 1351;
- William of Winslow, elected 1374;
- John Warham, at least 1396 until at least 1401;
- Richard Smyth of Missenden, at least 1405 to 1428

== Burials ==
- Peter de Preaux

== See also ==
- Abbeys and priories in England
- List of monastic houses in Bedfordshire
