= David Flitwick (died 1353) =

14th-century English noble and member of Parliament

Sir David Flitwick KB
- Arms of de Flitwick:- "argent, 2 lions passant guardant sable"

M.P. for Bedfordshire
- In office 8 July 1313 – 1314
- Monarch: Edward II

Personal details
- Born: 1281 Flitwick, Bedfordshire
- Died: 1353 (aged 71–72)
- Children: Eleanor
- Parent(s): David Flitwick (1266–1311) & Lora Gumbaud/Gobaud

Sir David Flitwick KB (1281–1353), of Flitwick, Bedfordshire, was an English politician and soldier of the Anglo-Scots Wars who followed in the footsteps of his grandfather, also David Flitwick.

== Life ==
Flitwick joined Edward I of England in the invasion of Scotland and was made a Knight of the Bath at the Feast of the Swans alongside 266 other men including his brother-in-law William Marmion (a candidate to be the Knight of Norham Castle and inspiration for Walter Scott's poem "Marmion").

Flitwick was summoned to Parliament for the Bedfordshire constituency on 8 July 1313 and again on 23 September 1313.

The Inquisition post mortem held in 1353 found Flitwick to have been in possession of the manor of Flitwick in Bedfordshire and another in 1355 determined he also held Brendhall manor in Harlow, Essex and Ringstead (Ringstone?) and Leasingham manors in Lincolnshire and parcels of land at Anwick, Haconby and Killingholme.

== Family ==
Flitwick was succeeded by Eleanor. His sister, Lucy, married William Marmion.
