= Beadlow =

Hamlet in Bedfordshire, England

Coordinates: 52.031712°N 0.383543°W

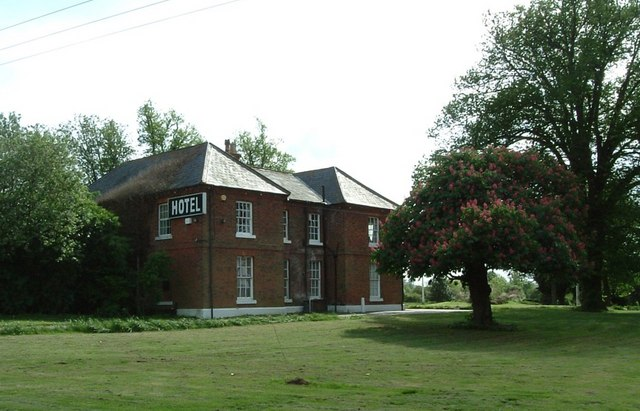
- Hotel

- Location within Bedfordshire
- Unitary authority: Central Bedfordshire
- Ceremonial county: Bedfordshire
- Region: East
- Country: England
- Sovereign state: United Kingdom
- Post town: SHEFFORD
- Postcode district: SG17
- Dialling code: 01525
- Police: Bedfordshire
- Fire: Bedfordshire
- Ambulance: East of England

Beadlow is a hamlet in the Central Bedfordshire district of Bedfordshire, England. At the 2011 Census, the population of the hamlet was included in the civil parish of Campton and Chicksands.

It is located around a mile and a half east of Clophill, of whose civil parish it forms a part, and around two and a half miles west of Shefford, in whose post town it lies. The River Flit flows through the hamlet.

== See also ==
- Beadlow Priory
