= Malcolm Wynn =

English cricketer

Malcolm Ernest Wynn (born 10 December 1948) is an English former cricketer. He played as a right-handed batsman and a right-arm medium-pace bowler for Bedfordshire County Cricket Club between 1968 and 1970. He was born in Flitwick, Bedfordshire.

Wynn played in 13 Minor Counties Championship matches and made a single List A cricket appearance against Buckinghamshire in the 1970 Gillette Cup, top-scoring for his team with 35 runs.

Wynn went on to play for Bedfordshire Over-50s and Over-60s teams in the Over-50s and Over-60s County Championship.
