= Thomas Bek (bishop of Lincoln) =

14th-century Bishop of Lincoln

- Bishop of Lincoln
- Elected: c. 1 March 1341
- Term ended: 2 February 1347
- Predecessor: Henry Burghersh
- Successor: John Gynwell

Orders
- Consecration: 7 July 1342

Personal details
- Born: 1282
- Died: 2 February 1347 (aged 64–65)
- Denomination: Catholic

Thomas Bek (also spelled Beck) (1282 – 2 February 1347) was the Bishop of Lincoln from 1341 until his death. He was a member of the same family as Antony Bek, Bishop of Durham, and Thomas Bek, Bishop of St David's.

Bek was elected on about 1 March 1341 and consecrated on 7 July 1342. He died on 2 February 1347.

== Citations ==
Catholic Church titles
Preceded by Henry Burghersh	Bishop of Lincoln; 1341–1347	Succeeded by John Gynwell
