= Bedford Abbey =

Monastery in Bedford, England

- Interactive map of Bedford Abbey

Monastery information
- Order: Benedictine/Augustinian
- Diocese: Diocese of Lincoln

Site
- Location: Bedford, Bedfordshire, England
- Coordinates: 52.1354°N 0.4674°W

Bedford Abbey was a short-lived Benedictine monastery, recorded in 10th-century England. Bedford Priory, perhaps representing the same institution two centuries later, was an Augustinian priory that within two decades of its foundation moved to nearby Newnham.

Bedford Abbey existed in the 10th-century, staffed with Benedictine monks when Oscytel, Archbishop of York, died in 971. The archbishop was buried in the abbey, after his body was taken there by its abbot, Thurcytel (who later moved to Crowland Abbey). Thurcytel is the only known abbot of the monastery. Its history after this is obscure, and may have evolved into St Paul's Church in Bedford, which became an Augustinian priory c. 1166.

Around 1180, the priory moved to Newnham (see Newnham Priory).
