= Henry Burghersh =

14th-century Bishop of Lincoln, Treasurer of England, and Chancellor of England

- Bishop of Lincoln
- In office: 27 May 1320
- Predecessor: Anthony Bek
- Successor: Thomas Bek

Orders
- Consecration: 20 July 1320

Personal details
- Born: 1292
- Died: 4 December 1340 (aged 47–48) Ghent
- Denomination: Catholic

Henry Burghersh (1292 – 4 December 1340), was Bishop of Lincoln (1320–1340) and served as Lord Chancellor of England (1328–1330). He was a younger son of Robert de Burghersh, 1st Baron Burghersh (died 1306), and a nephew of Bartholomew de Badlesmere, 1st Baron Badlesmere. He was educated in France.

On 27 May 1320 owing to Badlesmere's influence Pope John XXII appointed Burghersh bishop of Lincoln in spite of the fact that the chapter had already made an election to the vacant bishopric, and he was consecrated bishop on 20 July 1320. After the execution of Badlesmere in 1322 Burghersh's lands were seized by King Edward II, and the pope was urged to deprive him; about 1326, however, his possessions were restored, a proceeding which did not prevent him from joining Edward's wife, Queen Isabella, and taking part in the movement which led to the deposition and murder of the king.

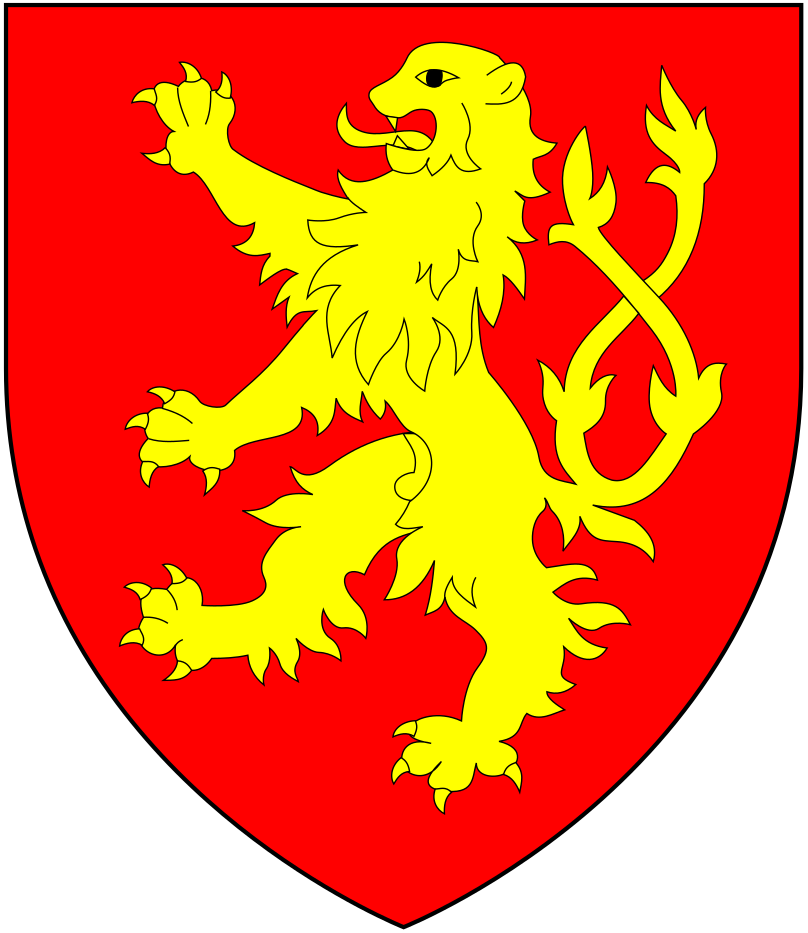
Arms of Burghersh: Gules, a lion rampant double queued or

Enjoying the favour of the new king, Edward III, the bishop was Lord Treasurer from 1327 to 1328 and then became chancellor of England in 1328; but he failed to secure the archbishopric of Canterbury which became vacant about the same time, and was deprived of his office of chancellor and imprisoned when Isabella lost her power in 1330. But he was soon released and again in a position of influence. He was treasurer of England from 1334 to 1337, and high in the favour and often in the company of Edward III; he was sent on several important errands, and entrusted with important commissions. He died at Ghent on 4 December 1340.

== Citations ==
Political offices
| Preceded by John Hotham | Lord Chancellor; 1328–1330 | Succeeded by John de Stratford |
| Preceded by Adam Orleton | Lord High Treasurer; 1327–1328 | Succeeded by Thomas Charlton |
| Preceded by Adam Orleton | Lord High Treasurer; 1334–1337 | Succeeded by William la Zouche |
Catholic Church titles
| Preceded by Anthony Bek | Bishop of Lincoln; 1320–1340 | Succeeded by Thomas Bek |
