= John Gynwell =

14th-century Bishop of Lincoln

- Bishop of Lincoln
- Appointed: 23 March 1347
- Term ended: 5 August 1362
- Predecessor: Thomas Bek
- Successor: John Bokyngham

Orders
- Consecration: 23 September 1347

Personal details
- Died: 5 August 1362
- Denomination: Catholic

John Gynwell (Note: Or John Gyndell or John Gyndwelle or John Sinwell) (died 1362) was a medieval Bishop of Lincoln. He was nominated on 23 March 1347 and consecrated on 23 September 1347. He was involved in controversy in 1357, when his servant Simon Warde was accused of violent affray with certain members of the Order of Hospitallers. A commission of inquiry was set up to look into the matter, but the matter ended inconclusively. He died on 5 August 1362.

== Citations ==
Catholic Church titles
Preceded by Thomas Bek	Bishop of Lincoln; 1347–1362	Succeeded by John Bokyngham
