= John Bokyngham =

14th-century Bishop of Lincoln

- Bishop of Lincoln
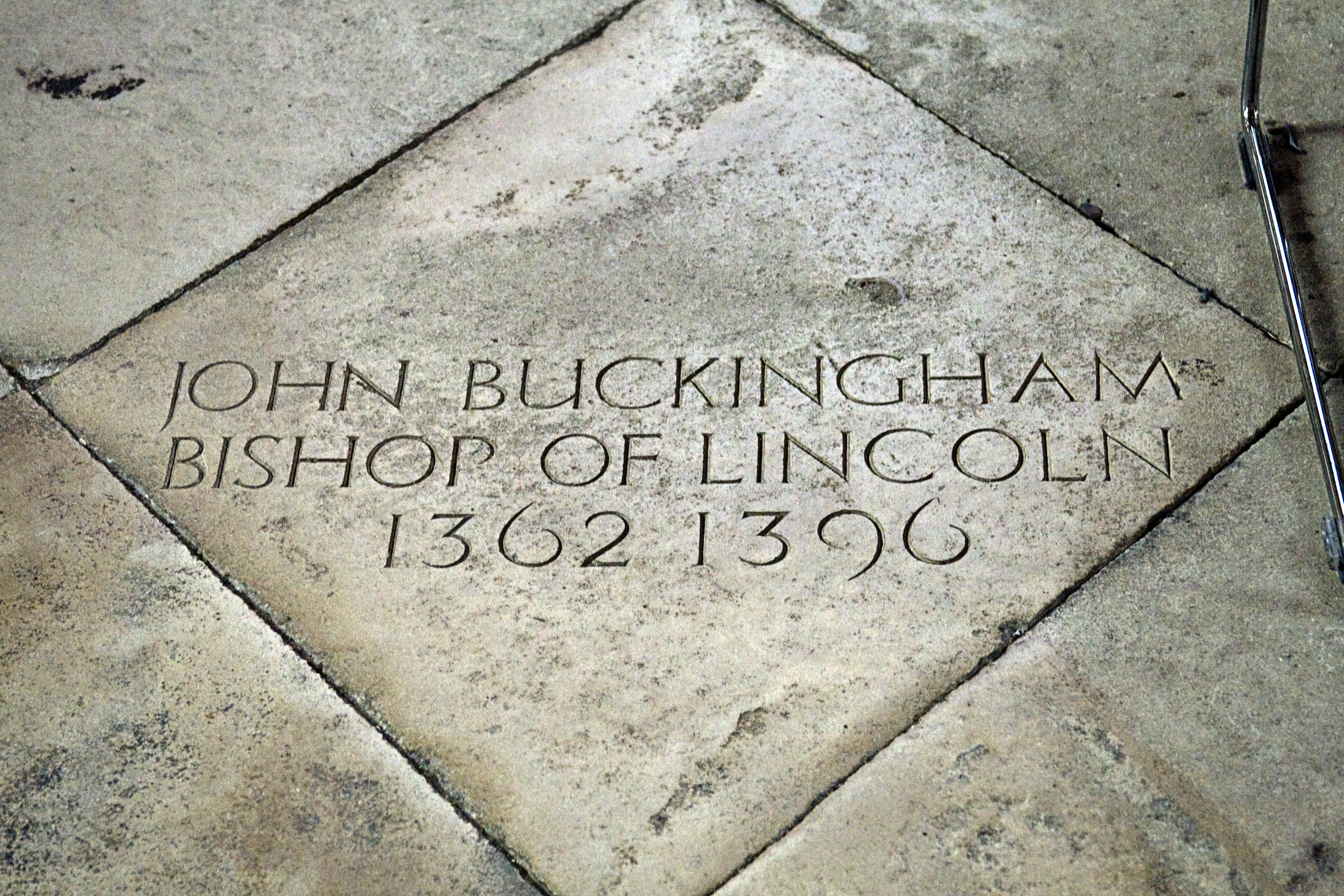
- Flagstone in Canterbury Cathedral memorializing Bokyngham
- Elected: between 20 August 1362 and 4 October 1362
- Term ended: resigned between March and June 1398
- Predecessor: John Gynwell
- Successor: Henry Beaufort

Orders
- Consecration: 25 June 1363

Personal details
- Died: 10 March 1398
- Denomination: Catholic

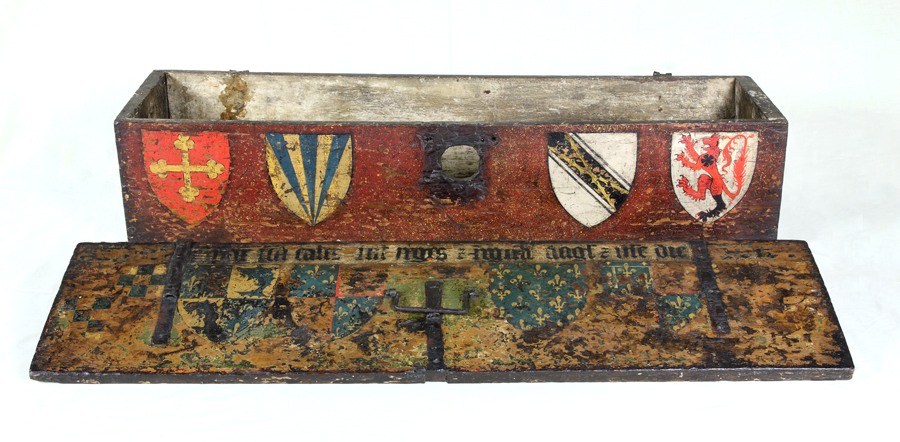
Far left: arms of John Bokyngham (Gules, a cross bottony or) on a chest made to hold the Treaty of Calais, signed in 1360 between Edward III of England and John II of France

John Bokyngham (or Buckingham; died 1398) was a medieval treasury official and Bishop of Lincoln.

== Administrative career ==
Bokyngham entered the treasury and was appointed Chamberlain of the Exchequer from 1347 until 1350, Keeper of the Great Wardrobe in 1350 until 1353, Keeper of the (Household) Wardrobe in 1353 until 1357, and a Baron of the Exchequer in 1357 until 1360.

Bokyngham was keeper of the seal of Thomas, regent in England from March to July 1360. He was then appointed Lord Privy Seal in 1360 and held that office until 1363.

== Ecclesiastical career ==
Bokyngham was collated Archdeacon of Nottingham in 1349 and then appointed Dean of Lichfield from 1350 to 1363. He also held the position of Archdeacon of Northampton from 1351 to 1363. He was elected bishop of Lincoln between 20 August 1362 and 4 October 1362 and was consecrated on 25 June 1363. He resigned the see between March and June 1398 and died on 10 March 1398.

Bokyngham's diocese, which included Oxford and Lutterworth, was the headquarters of the Lollard movement. The bishop attempted to stop Swynderby's preaching and managed to turn him out of the chapel of St John the Baptist. Swynderby was, however, upheld by the people. He used two great stones which lay outside the chapel as a pulpit, and declared that as long as he had the goodwill of the people he would 'preach in the king's highway in spite of the bishop's teeth.' In May 1382 Bokyngham attended the synod called the council of 'the earthquake,' held in London by Archbishop Courtenay, in which the propositions ascribed to the Wycliffite preachers were pronounced heretical.

While bishop, Bokyngham outlawed the veneration of a cross at Rippingale. However, the veneration continued and the advocates of the cult appealed to the papacy. In 1393 Agnes Palmer was living as an anchoress next to St Peter's Church in Northampton. She was summoned before Bokyngham on several charges of heresy and one of incontinence. She was said to be a leader of Lollard heretics. She was imprisoned by Bokyngham in Banbury after calling the Bishop an anti-Christ and only admitting that on the charge of incontinence she was innocent. The outcome is unclear.

== Citations ==
Political offices
Preceded by John Winwick	Lord Privy Seal; 1360–1363	Succeeded by William of Wykeham
Catholic Church titles
Preceded by John Gynwell	Bishop of Lincoln; 1362–1398	Succeeded by Henry Beaufort
