= Flitwick =

Town in Bedfordshire, England

Coordinates: 52.00384°N 0.49656°W

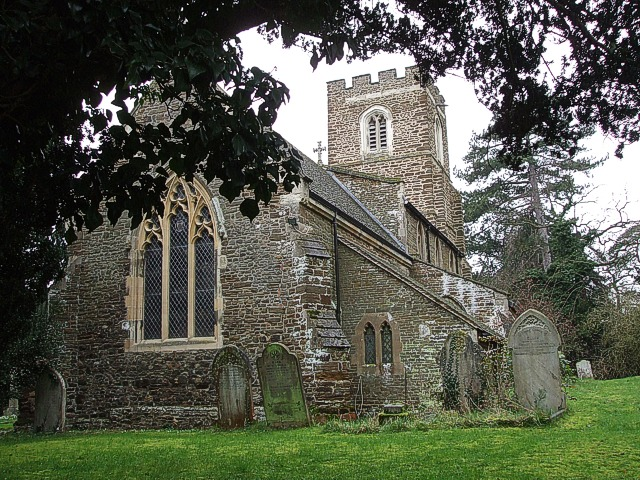
- Church of St Peter and St Paul

- Location within Bedfordshire
- Population: 13,663 (Parish, 2021)
- OS grid reference: TL033350
- Civil parish: Flitwick
- Unitary authority: Central Bedfordshire
- Ceremonial county: Bedfordshire
- Region: East
- Country: England
- Sovereign state: United Kingdom
- Post town: BEDFORD
- Postcode district: MK45
- Dialling code: 01525
- Police: Bedfordshire
- Fire: Bedfordshire
- Ambulance: East of England
- UK Parliament: Mid Bedfordshire

Flitwick (/ˈflɪtɪk/) is a town and civil parish in Central Bedfordshire, England. It is mentioned in the Domesday Book of 1086 as "a hamlet on the River Flitt". The spelling Flytwyk appears in 1381.

The nearby River Flit runs through Flitwick Moor, a nature reserve and a Site of Special Scientific Interest.

== Location ==
It is broadly equidistant between Bedford 10 mi (16 km) and Luton 10 mi (16 km). It shares many services with the neighbouring town of Ampthill, which lies just to the north. The boundary between the two towns is a watercourse called the Running Waters, which is now the route of the A507.

== Nearby settlements ==
Ampthill, Maulden, Clophill, Flitton, Greenfield, Steppingley, Pulloxhill, Westoning, Harlington, Barton le Clay, Tingrith, Eversholt, Millbrook

== Governance ==
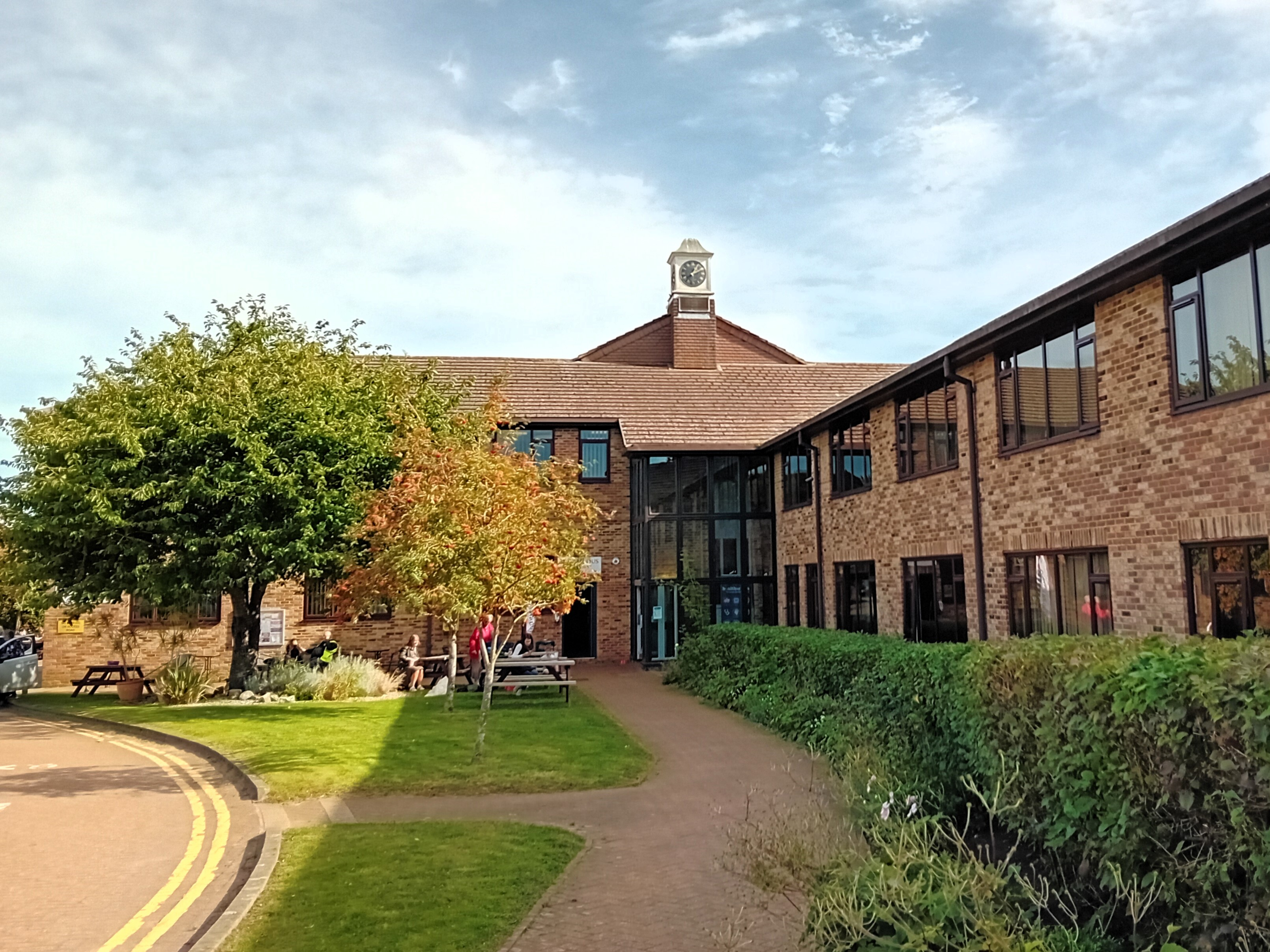
Rufus Centre

There are two tiers of local government covering Flitwick, at parish (town) and unitary authority level: Flitwick Town Council and Central Bedfordshire Council. The town council is based at the Rufus Centre on Steppingley Road, which was built in 1999.

== Shopping ==
Flitwick has seen a large expansion in its population in recent years, but its retail facilities have not kept up with this growth. The local council has drawn up plans to redevelop the town centre to improve its retail offering . At present, it has a Tesco, a Co-op, which provides a secondary food source to the community and many smaller shops and estate agents, many in close proximity to the railway station. There is an open-air market every Friday selling local produce, which is set up on the car park of the village hall. The open-air market has a variety of stalls such as fishmongers, baker, haberdashery, and fruit and vegetables.

The town also opened an Aldi in September 2023.

Flitwick market currently experiencing new stalls, including butcher and Thai food.

== Leisure ==
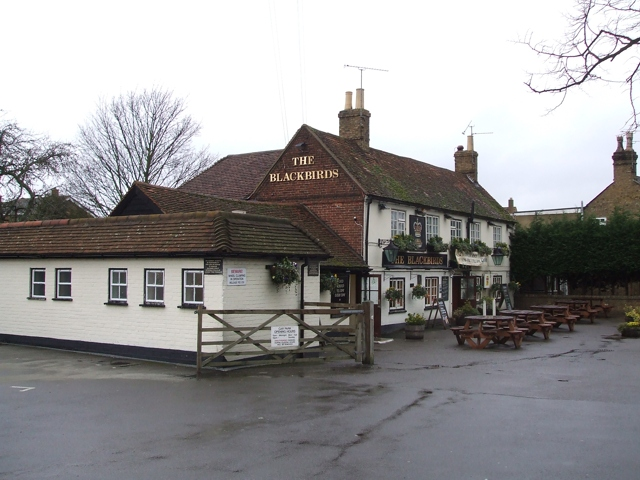
The Blackbirds public house

There is a sports centre with a 25-metre swimming pool with kids' pool attached. The leisure centre also has a gym, squash courts with leagues, and a gymnasium. A new leisure centre was built for opening in early March 2015. The previous leisure site was earmarked by Central Beds Council for downsizing and over-55s' assisted living accommodation.

Flitwick has four public houses: the Crown, the Swan, the Bumble Bee, and the Blackbirds. The Blackbirds is a 17th-century building with a large beer garden and children's play area. The pub formerly known as the Wheatsheaf re-opened as an Indian restaurant called the Indian Lodge. A membership-operated social club, The Flitwick Club, is situated on The High Street, opposite the Drivestyle yard.

Flitwick is also home to Flitwick Bowls Club, founded in 1923 and located on Kings Road, it is both a lawn bowls club and a social club offering a cheap bar and entertainments for its members all year round.

Flitwick hosts several free events including, The Flitwick car show in August, Halloween Trail, Krampus Run, Family Funday and new for 2026 Flitwick Fairy Festival

Center Parcs Woburn Forest opened in July 2014 on the outskirts of Flitwick at Warren Wood.

== Transport ==
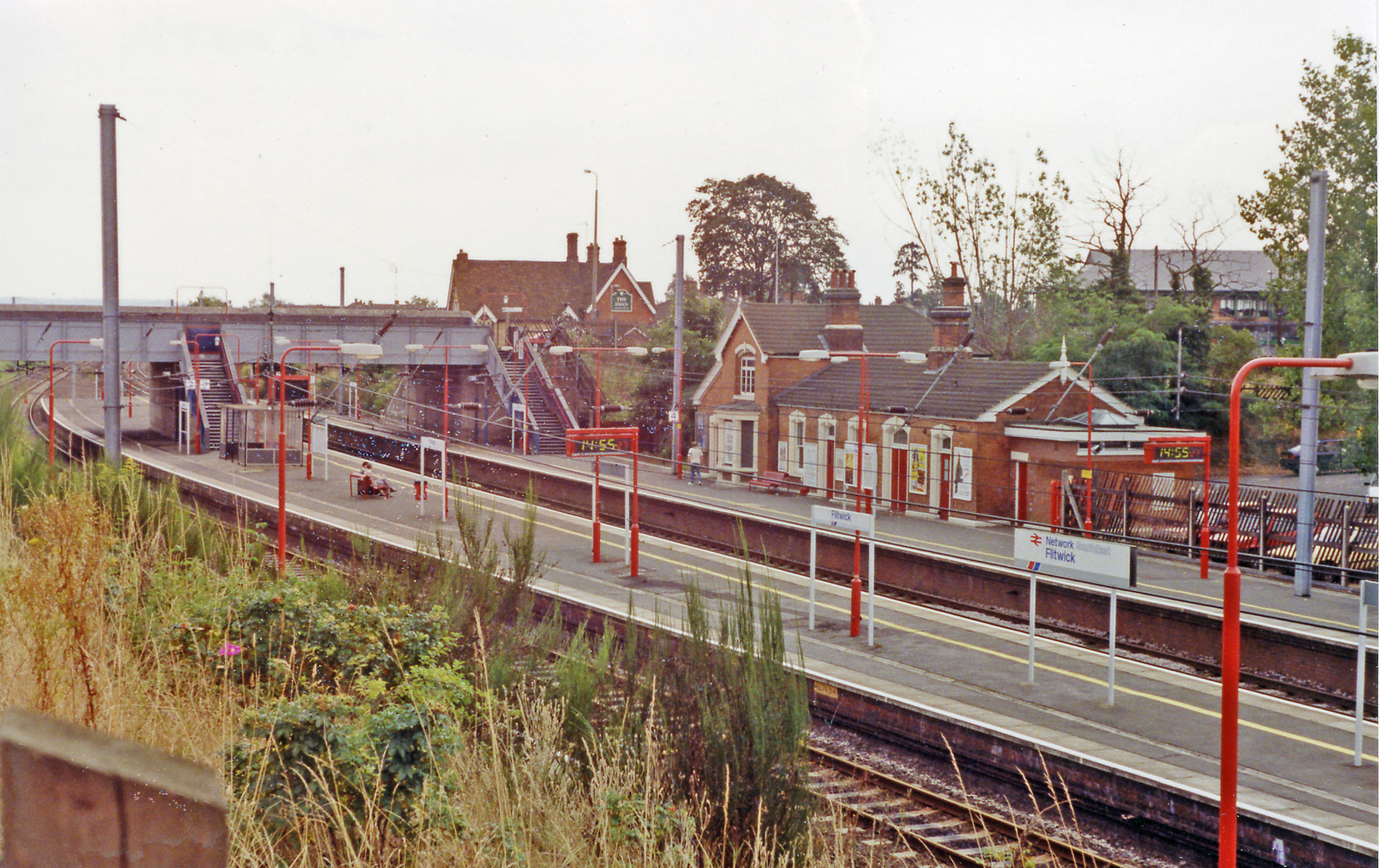
Flitwick Railway Station in 1991

=== Road ===
Flitwick is 4 miles (6 km) from junction 12 of the M1 motorway.

=== Bus ===
The main bus services are as follows:

42 (Grant Palmer) provides an hourly daytime service Mondays to Saturdays providing a connection to: Westoning, Harlington, Toddington, Ampthill, Houghton Conquest, and Bedford. Mondays to Saturdays – no Sunday service.

2 (Stagecoach) provides an hourly daytime service Mondays to Saturdays to Ampthill, Kempston and Bedford. Mondays to Saturdays – no Sunday service.

44 (Grant Palmer) Bedford via A6 to Bedford, Wilstead, Flitwick, Silsoe (Monday – Friday Only)

200 (Grant Palmer) provides a two hourly service to Ampthill, Shefford, Clifton and Biggleswade. Mondays to Fridays only.

34 (Grant Palmer) Milton Keynes

=== Rail ===
Flitwick has a station on the Thameslink line (First Capital Connect took over the franchise on 1 April 2006, taken over again on 14 September 2014 by Govia Thameslink Railway). Trains go north to Bedford and south to Luton, St Albans, London, Gatwick Airport, Three Bridges, East Grinstead, and Brighton making it a popular place to live for commuters.

== Schools ==
Flitwick has three lower schools (Kingsmoor, Templefield and Flitwick Lower School), a middle school (Woodland Middle School Academy). The old Flitwick School has been refurbished from its earlier state of neglect, and now serves as a further community centre, youth club and toddler group. Redborne Upper School is approximately 1 mile (1.6 km) away from Flitwick Railway Station, just on the Ampthill side of the Running Waters.

== Media ==
Local news and television programmes are provided by BBC East and ITV Anglia. Television signals are received from the nearby Sandy Heath TV transmitter. Local radio stations are BBC Three Counties Radio on 95.5 FM, Heart East on 96.9 FM, In2beats on 106.5 FM, and Bedford Radio, a community based radio station which broadcast online. The town is served by the local newspaper, Bedford Today (formerly Times & Citizen) and Flitwick Papers which is produced by the Flitwick Town Council and is distributed to every household in Flitwick.

== Sport ==
It has three football teams: Flitwick Town, who play in the Bedfordshire County League Premier Division, Flitwick Ladies, who play in the Bedfordshire & Hertfordshire Women's First Division and Flitwick Eagles. It is also home to Flitwick Cricket Club (The Otters) which has over 50 adult playing members and 160 Colts.

Flitwick also has a lawn bowls club, that was founded in 1923, and is located on Kings Road.

== Landmarks ==
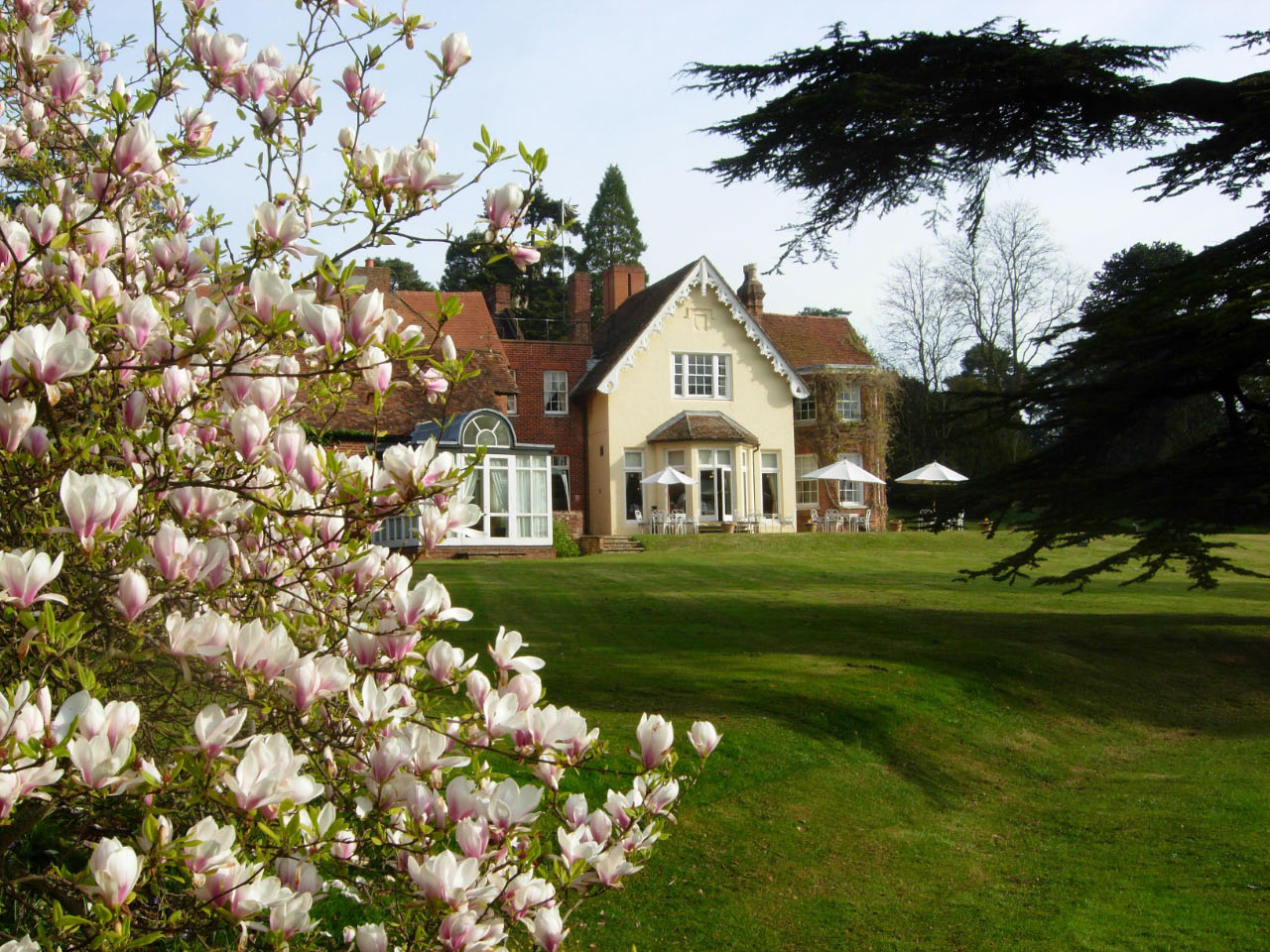
Flitwick Manor

Flitwick is known for its Flitwick Manor House, currently used as a hotel and restaurant.

There is also physical evidence of a Norman fortification, Flitwick Castle, locally known as "The Mount".

The medieval Church of St Peter & St Paul is the parish church, located in the town.

Land at Clay Hill, near Flitwick, serves as one of the UK's first subsidy-free solar farms, and is operated by Gridserve. It came online in 2017 and comprises 10MW of bifacial solar cells and 6MW of energy storage.

== Notable people ==
- Henry John Sylvester Stannard (12 July 1870 – 21 January 1951), British watercolour artist whose patrons included the British Royal Family.
- Michael Crowther, prominent American wildlife conservationist and founder of the Indianapolis Prize, grew up in Flitwick, living there from age 4 until age 17. He attended Flitwick Primary School and Bedford Modern School.
- Brian Stein, former Luton Town professional footballer, lives in Flitwick.
- Malcolm Wynn, former English cricketer, was born in the town
- Russell Howard, famed west country stand-up comedian lived in Flitwick for a few years when he attended Bedford Modern School.
- Adam Croft, Popular British Crime Fiction Author.
