= Dunstable Priory =

Coordinates: 51.8860°N 0.5176°W

The Priory Church, Dunstable
- The Priory Church of St. Peter, Dunstable
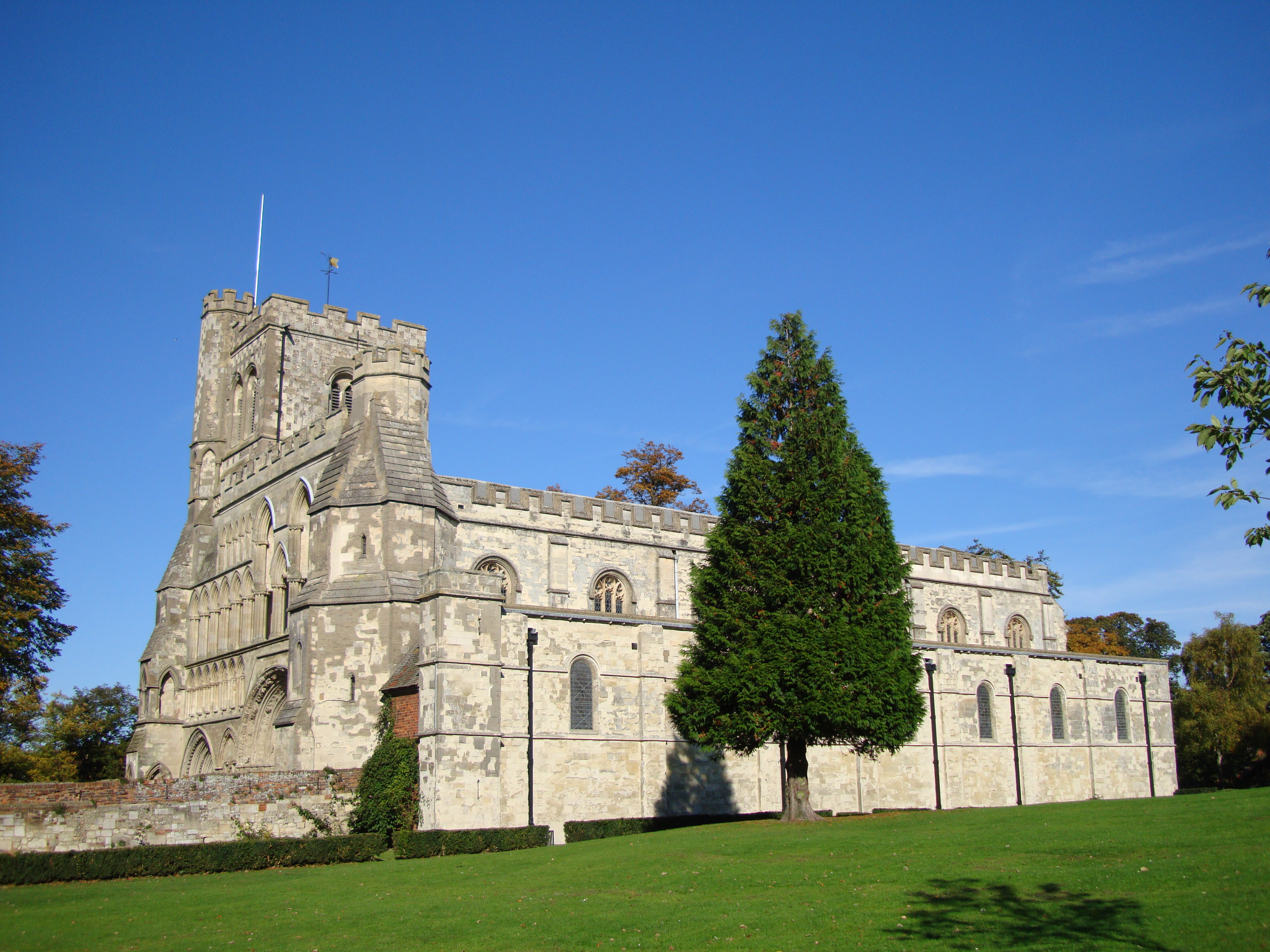
- The Priory Church, Dunstable
- Location: Church Street, Dunstable, LU5 4NA
- Country: England
- Denomination: Church of England
- Previous denomination: Roman Catholic
- Website: http://www.dunstableparish.org.uk/

History
- Founded: 1132
- Founder: King Henry I

Administration
- Diocese: St Albans
- Parish: Dunstable

The Priory Church of St Peter with its monastery (Dunstable Priory) was founded in 1132 by Henry I for Augustinian Canons in Dunstable, Bedfordshire, England. St Peter's today is only the nave of what remains of an originally much larger Augustinian priory church. The monastic buildings consisted of a dormitory for the monks, an infirmary, stables, workshops, bakehouse, brewhouse and buttery. There was also a hostel for pilgrims and travellers, the remains of which is known today as Priory House. Opposite the Priory was one of the royal palaces belonging to Henry I, known as Kingsbury.

The present church and Deanery form part of the Archdeaconry of Bedford, located within the Diocese of St Albans. It became a Grade I listed building on 25 October 1951.

== History ==
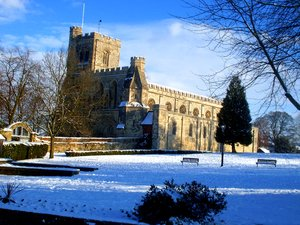
Dunstable Priory Church in winter

The Augustinian priory of Dunstable was founded by Henry I about the year 1132, and endowed by him at the same time with the lordship of the manor and town in which it stood. Tradition says that the same king was also the founder of the town and had caused the forest to be cleared away from the point where Watling Street and the Icknield Way crossed each other, on account of the robbers who infested the highway. He granted to the priory all such liberties and rights in the town of Dunstable as he held in his own demesne lands. He also endowed the Priory with the quarry at Totternhoe.

His charter was confirmed by Henry II; and before the reign of Richard I a great many of the churches of the neighborhood had also been granted to the priory by as many as thirteen different benefactors, besides the chapel of Ruxox, in the county of Bedford, with Cublington, North Marston and half Chesham, Buckinghamshire, and Higham Ferrers with half Pattishall, Northamptonshire. Several of these gifts were disputed before the century was out, but most of them were retained by the priory throughout its existence.

Dunstable priory was a daughter house of Holy Trinity Priory, which itself had been founded from St. Botolph's Priory in Colchester. Bernard, the first prior of the house, was closely associated with the introduction of Austin Canons into England. His brother Norman became prior first of St. Botolph's, and then of Holy Trinity. They had traveled to Chartres and Beauvais to learn the Rule of Saint Augustine, with a view to introducing it into England.

=== 13th century ===
At the beginning of the 13th century, in the year 1202, Richard de Morins, a canon of Merton, became prior of Dunstable. From 1210 he took over as Dunstable's chronicler. He was evidently a man of very varied interests and a considerable capacity for affairs. Before he had been prior a year he was dispatched on the king's business to Rome; and it was probably owing to his influence that the lordship of Houghton Regis, with other gifts, were confirmed to the priory in 1203.

During his term of office, in the year 1219, he secured the right of holding a court at Dunstable for all pleas of the Crown, and of sitting beside the justices itinerant at their visits to the town: a privilege which brought him into less happy relations with the townsmen and may have helped to hasten their revolt against his authority in 1228. He also successfully established the right of his house to the Harlington church in 1223. The priory was twice visited by Henry III. during the time of Richard de Morins: once after the siege of Bedford Castle, and again in the midst of the troubles connected with the burgesses, whom he attempted to pacify, at the prior's earnest request.

In spite of the losses under King John and the difficulties with the burgesses, the priory seems to have enjoyed greater prosperity at this time than at any later period of which we have a clear account. In 1213 the conventual church was dedicated by Bishop Hugh of Wells. The gift of the church of Bradbourne in the Peak, with its chapels and lands, provided maintenance for three canons, and formed a kind of cell to the priory. The death of Richard de Morins in 1242 was followed immediately by heavy losses. In 1243, 800 of the sheep belonging to the priory in the Peak district died, and a succession of bad seasons led to great scarcity. By 1255 the canons not only had no corn to sell but not enough for themselves; they had to buy all their food at great expense, for two years after this; so that the Friars Preachers, when they arrived in 1259, were even less welcome than they would have been at any ordinary time. When Simon of Eaton became prior in 1262, he found the house 400 marks in debt, and all the wool of the year already sold.

But in spite of the pressure of debt and poverty, which was not diminished during his term of office, the prior was as much interested as his predecessors had been in the course of public events. Like most of the clergy and religious of the period, he was in sympathy with Simon de Montfort, whom he looked upon as the champion of the Church; and in 1263, when the earl visited Dunstable, the prior went out to meet him, and admitted him to the fraternity of the house. In 1265 a council was held at Dunstable to consider the possibility of peace with the defeated barons, and the king and queen visited the house in the course of the year; but though Simon de Montfort had been there quite recently, and the sympathy of the prior with his cause could not have been altogether a secret one, no fine was imposed upon the priory on that account.

In 1274 a long and expensive suit was begun between the prior and convent of Dunstable and Eudo la Zouche, who had become lord of Houghton and Eaton Bray by his marriage with Millicent de Cantelow. Eudo refused to recognize the rights of the prior (established not only by charter but by long custom) to a gallows and prison in Houghton; he released one of his men from the prison and overthrew the gallows. Under the next prior, William le Breton, the gallows was restored; but Eudo still refused to recognize the prison as the prior's right, and presently erected a gallows of his own. The dispute went on for some years, and, after the death of Eudo, was continued by his wife Millicent until the year 1289, when it was finally decided in favor of the prior.

In 1286, the priory had to trim its trees and hedges along the King's Highway, pursuant to the Statute of Winchester to curb the activities of highwaymen. It was just at this time that the king was asking for subsidies for his Welsh war. By an accumulation of misfortune, in the same winter, the outer walls of the priory had collapsed in the wet weather, and their hayricks had been destroyed by fire; and the tithes due to the Hospitallers from North Marston church were in such long arrears that a new arrangement had to be made to pay them off. In 1295 the house at Bradbourne was so poor that all the wool produced there had to be granted to the support of the three brethren who served the church and chapels. The later pages of the annals are a long story of poverty and struggle to get clear of debt.

==== Clock ====
The Dunstable Priory clock was one of the oldest mechanical clocks in England, built in 1283. Accounts say it was installed above the rood screen. Its fate is unknown.

=== 14th to 16th century ===
Of the fourteenth century there are only a few scanty notices, the only events told at any length being those connected with the Peasants' Revolt in 1381, when the prior, Thomas Marshall, appears by his courage and moderation to have saved his own house from serious loss, and his burghers from punishment. Henry VI visited Dunstable in 1459, but there is no record of his relations with the priory; its history during the fifteenth century is not recorded in any way. But in the sixteenth century it was again connected with an important historical event, when on 23 May 1533, in the Lady Chapel of the conventual church at Dunstable, Archbishop Cranmer together with and the bishops of Winchester, London, Bath and Lincoln pronounced the marriage between Henry VIII and Catherine of Aragon to be null and void. The location arose as Catherine was then residing at nearby Ampthill, some 12 miles to the north. In 1535 the prior, Gervase Markham, with twelve canons, signed the acknowledgement of the Royal Supremacy, and on 20 January 1540–1, he surrendered his house to the king and received a pension of £60.

The smaller English religious houses had been dissolved by Act of Parliament in 1536, and the church and priory at Dunstable were closed down in January 1540. The prior and the twelve canons were granted pensions and given dispensations to serve as secular priests. The great church and the buildings of the priory were initially kept standing intact, since it was intended to create a see at Dunstable, with the priory church as its cathedral. However, the scheme for the creation of new bishoprics fell through after a few years and the beautiful church (with the exception of the parochial nave) shared the fate of the monastic buildings, being plundered of all that was valuable and left in ruin.

There were only thirteen monks besides the prior at the time of the dissolution; eleven canons and two lay brothers; in the early days there were probably more, though never a very large number. Between the years 1223 and 1275 only twenty-five admissions to the novitiate are recorded, and thirteen deaths; but the entries were perhaps not always made with equal care, and the entrance of lay brothers was not noticed at all. Besides the religious there were a number of other inmates of the priory; a 'new house for the carpenters and wheelwrights within the court' was built in 1250; there was accommodation also for the chaplains of the monastery, and for boarders who had bought corrodies, as well as pensioners in the almonry. The porter of the great gate was sometimes a secular, unlike the custom of Benedictine houses.

=== Visitations ===
There can be no doubt of the good order of the house during the time of Richard de Morins; he would scarcely have been chosen twice to visit other houses unless he had ruled his own with care and diligence. During his forty years of office canons of Dunstable were at least five times elected priors to other monasteries of the order—at Caldwell, St. Frideswide's, Ashby and Coldnorton. Bishop Grosseteste visited the house once in 1236, not so much to inquire into the daily life of the priory as to investigate its title to several appropriate churches; but he exacted an oath on this occasion from all the canons individually, and one of them fled to Woburn rather than submit to it.

The bishop came again while Geoffrey of Barton was prior. Henry de Bilenda, the cellarer, upon whom so much depended, was incapable or untrustworthy, and in 1249 fled to the Cistercians at Merivale, rather than render an account of his stewardship. In 1274 Bishop Gravesend sent a canon of Lincoln to visit Dunstable, who left his corrections in writing; and in Advent of the same year he made a personal visitation. In November 1279 Bishop Sutton came and discharged his office 'strictly and without respect of persons.' The sub-prior and certain others were removed from their charge and forbidden to hold office in future, and certain 'less useful members' of the household expelled; in May of the following year, he deposed the prior, William le Breton, from all pastoral care. It seems most likely that these depositions were on account of mismanagement rather than for any personal failings; the great necessity and heavy debts of the house called for stringent measures, and William le Breton had shown himself unable to meet the difficulty. Efforts were madeto curtail expenses and get in ready money for the payment of debts. There is no sign of any other grave faults having been committed, nor of anything like luxurious living. The new prior, according to the bishop's advice, set himself to limit the expenses of the whole house and assigned a fixed income to the kitchen for the future; the deposed prior had proper maintenance assigned to him at Ruxox. The canons seem to have borne no ill-will to Bishop Sutton for his corrections and were ready on his next visit to their church (which was made not officially but only in passing) to praise him for his excellent sermon. Other visitations of his are mentioned in 1284, 1287, 1288, and 1293; the last was only to confer orders. Archbishop Peckham came in 1284, but found all well ('as the bishop had been there quite late,' the chronicler naively remarks); and Archbishop Winchelsea in 1293. The only serious charge that could be laid to the door of the canons all through the thirteenth century was their inability to keep clear of debt, and the record shows that this was often quite as much their misfortune as their fault. There are many incidental remarks of the chroniclers which serve to show that the tone of the house was thoroughly religious and that the canons were faithful in keeping their rule. It will suffice to instance, early in the century, the generous treatment of the two young canons (one only a novice), who escaped by night through a window and went to join the Friars Minor at Oxford. They were indeed solemnly excommunicated and compelled to return; but after they had done their penance in the chapter house and had been absolved, they were allowed a year to consider the matter, and if after that time they preferred the stricter order, they were granted permission to depart; if not, they might remain at Dunstable. A good deal later than this, in 1283, the apologetic way in which the chronicler relates how the prior went out to dinner with John Durant is sufficient to show that the ordinary rules and customs of the order were not commonly broken.

During the fourteenth century, there were several visitations. There is no notice of any by Bishop Dalderby; but he commissioned the prior of Dunstable in 1315 to visit the nuns of St. Giles-in-the-Wood in his name. Bishop Burghersh in 1322 wrote to order the prior and convent to take back a brother who had been on a pilgrimage to the Holy Land, and asserted that he did so with the permission of his superior, and a little later the prior was cited for refusing to obey this injunction. In 1359 Bishop Gynwell, passing by the priory, noticed 'certain insolences and unlawful wanderings' of the canons, and wrote to reinforce the rule that none should go beyond the precincts of the monastery without reasonable cause, nor without the permission of the prior; and ordered further that such permission should not be too frequently given. He also reminded them of the rule that none should eat or drink outside the monastery, or talk with seculars without permission.

In 1379 Bishop Buckingham confirmed an important ordinance of Thomas Marshall, setting apart certain funds for the education of one of the canons at Oxford. The prior alludes to the poverty of his house, which was so great that were it not for the help of friends they would not be able to live decently and honestly, and religion would be diminished. Hitherto there had not been enough canons nor enough money to set apart one for special study; but the prior now wished to do so (partly out of the profits of a chantry established by his own family), 'seeing the advantage of learning and the necessity of preaching, the priory being a populous place where a great number of people come together.' All this certainly points to a satisfactory state of the priory under Thomas Marshall, and accords well with what we know of his character from other sources.

Bishop Grey's injunctions are the only notice that we have of the internal history of the priory during the fifteenth century; they do not indicate any special laxity, and only repeat the usual orders as to silence, singing of the divine office, the unlawfulness of eating and drinking after Compline, going to Dunstable or having visitors without permission. And so again at the very end, just before the dissolution, the silence of Bishop Longland, and the king's choice of the priory for the solemn announcement of his divorce from Catherine of Aragon, constitute indirect evidence in favor of the house. On the whole, the priory of Dunstable shows a very good record in the matter of discipline and order, with only a few lapses.

=== Endowments ===
The original endowment of the priory was, the lordship of the manor and town of Dunstable; to which was added under Henry II. the lordship of Houghton Regis, and under John, the king's house and gardens at Dunstable. The manors of Stoke and Catesby, and of Ballidon in the Peak, are mentioned in the annals as the property of the priory during the thirteenth century. In 1291 the tithes of St. Peter and St. Cuthbert, Bedford, Dunstable, Studham, Totternhoe, Chalgrave, Husborne Crawley, Segenhoe, Flitwick, Pulloxhill, Steppingley, Harlington, Higham Ferrers, Newbottle, Cublington, a moiety of Great Brickhill, Pattishall and Bradbourne belonged to Dunstable Priory, with pensions in other churches. The temporalities at this time were only valued at a little more than £50; the annals of the house state the total income in 1273 as £107. The knight's fees attributed to Dunstable in 1316 were half a fee in Husborne Crawley and Flitwick, and another half in Pulloxhill, with some small fractions besides; they are practically the same in 1346 and 1428.

The valuation of the whole property of the priory in 1535 amounted to £344 13s. 4d., the first report of the Crown bailiff to £266 17s. 6¾d., including the manors of Studham, Wadlow, Stokehammond, Gledley, Grimscote, Catesby and Shortgrave, and the rectories of Studham, Totternhoe, Pulloxhill, Harlington, Husborne Crawley, Flitwick, Segenhoe, Bradbourne, Newbottle, Pattishall and Weedon.

=== Priors of Dunstable ===
Priors of Dunstable were:

- Bernard.
- Cuthbert.
- Thomas, occurs 1185, resigned 1202
- Richard de Morins, elected 1202, died 1242
- Geoffrey of Barton, elected 1242, resigned 1262
- Simon of Eaton elected 1262, died 1274
- William le Breton, elected 1274, deposed 1280
- William de Wederhore, elected 1280, resigned 1302
- John of Cheddington, elected 1302, died 1341
- John of London, elected 1341, resigned 1348
- Roger of Gravenhurst, elected 1348, died 1351
- Thomas Marshall elected 1351, died 1413
- John Roxton, elected 1413, resigned 1473
- Thomas Gylys, elected 1473, resigned 1482
- Richard Charnock, elected 1482, resigned 1500
- John Wastell, elected 1500, died 1525
- Gervase Markham, elected 1525, surr. 1540

=== Common seal ===
The seal of the priory used in the fifteenth century (round and large) represents St. Peter seated, holding the keys in the left hand, and the right raised in benediction. Legend: SIGILLUM ECCLIE SC . . PET . . LE.

The seal of Prior William de Wederhore (affixed to a document dated 1286) is the same as above; the counter-seal has a king and a saint (very indistinct), each standing under a crocketted canopy, the prior kneeling in prayer below. Legend: . . . . ILLUM WILLELMI PRIORIS DE. .

== Architecture ==
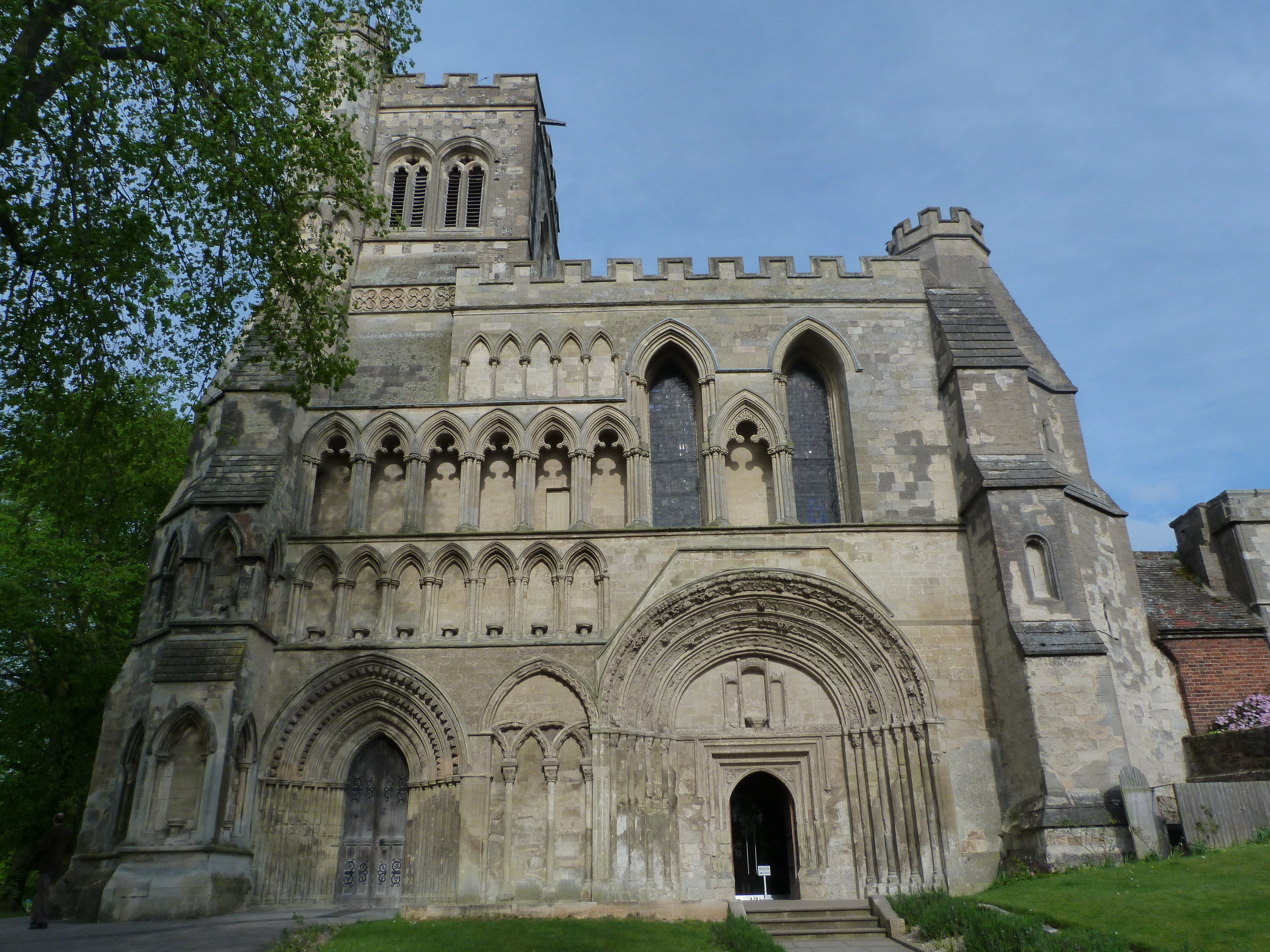
Dunstable priory facade

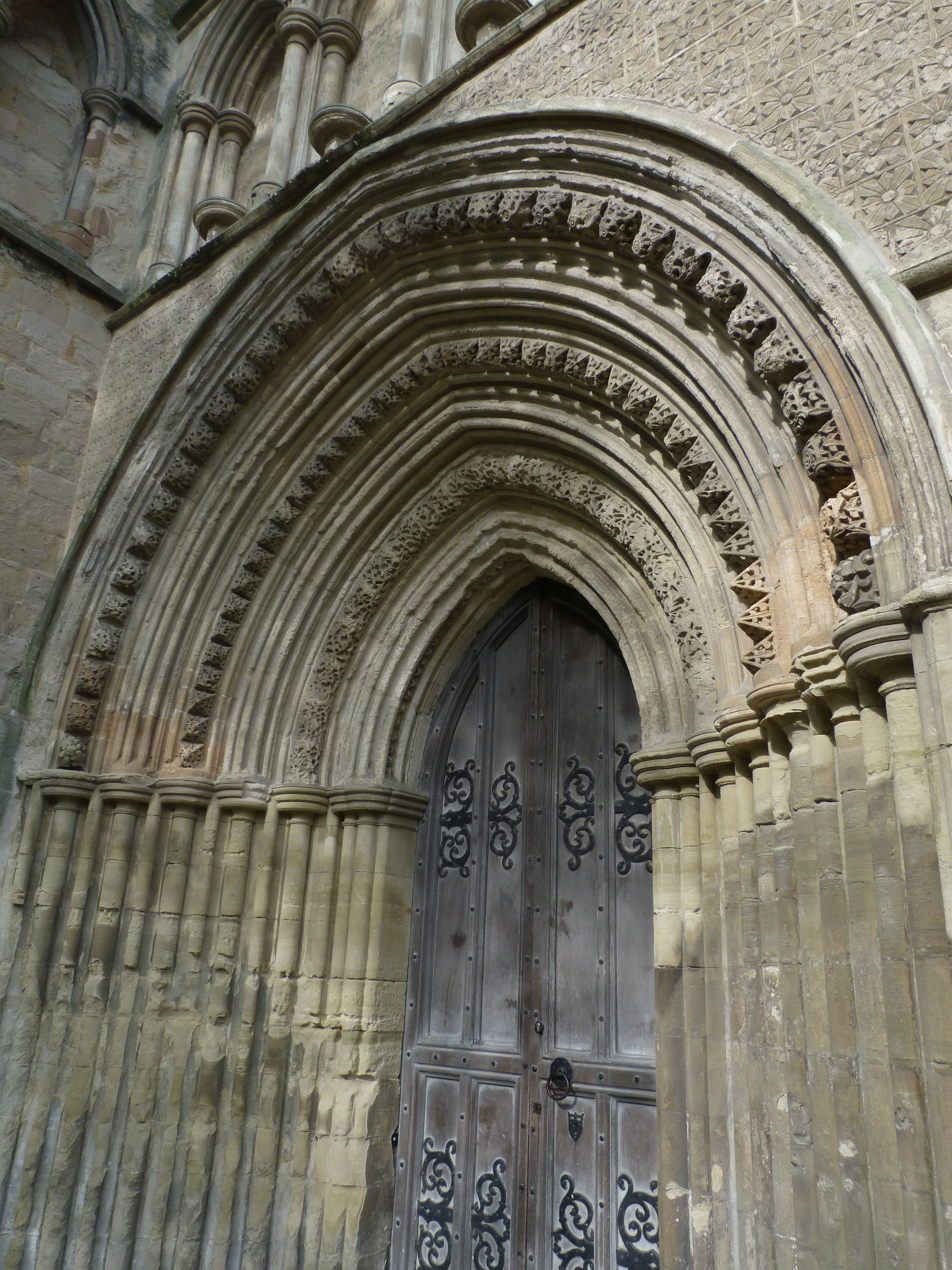
Small portal detail

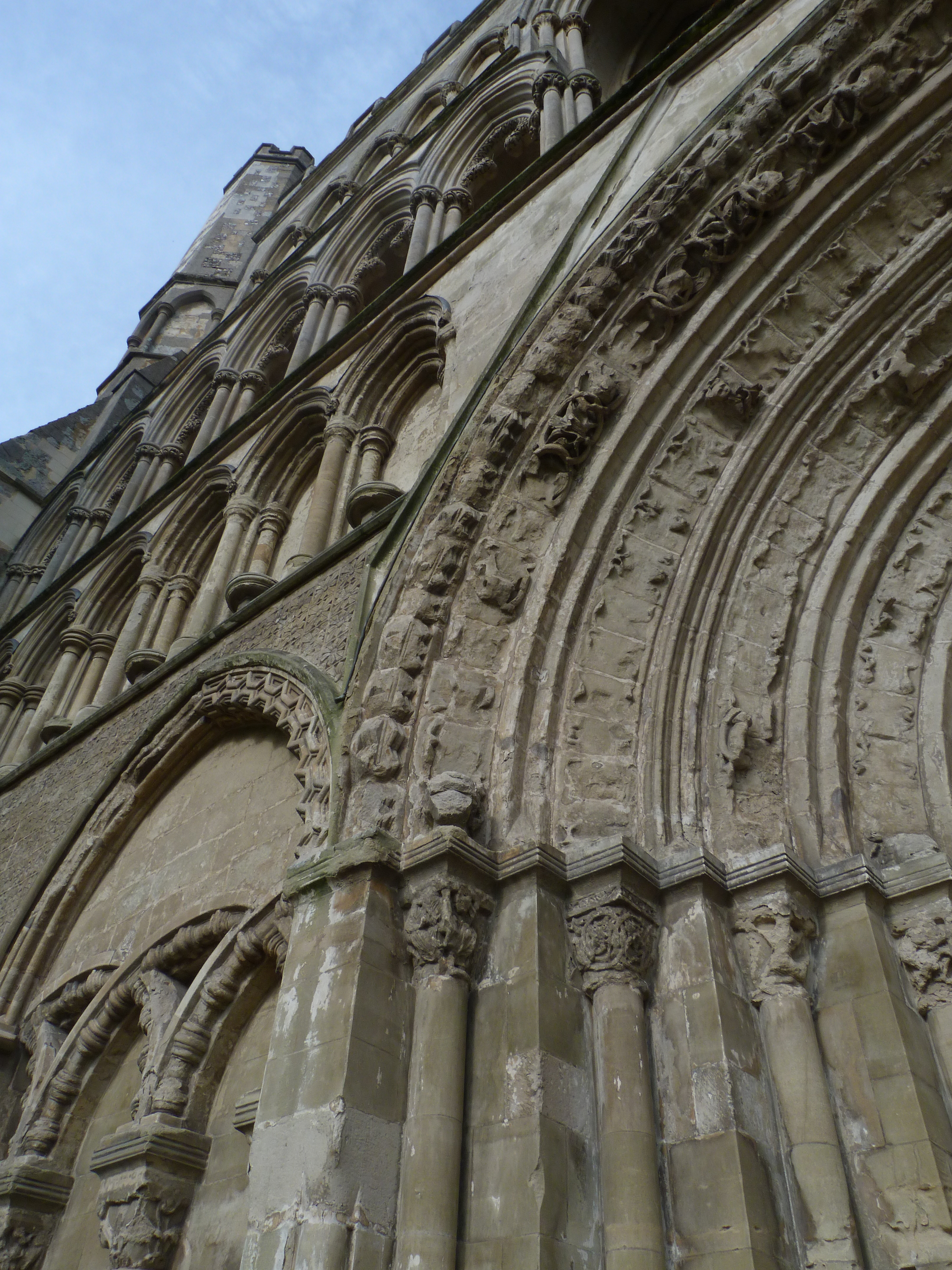
Main portal and facade detail

St Peter's is one of the best examples of Norman architecture in England. It was built in the form of a cross with a great tower at the crossing and with two smaller towers at the west end. It took 70 to 80 years before the church was complete. Ten years later a storm destroyed much of the front of the church. The damaged part was rebuilt in Early English style. The west front has a huge entrance consisting of four arches (1170–90) above a later 15th-century doorway. The entrance is decorated with diaper pattern and stiff-leaf moulding providing relief for a profusion of small arches. To the south west of the church is the 15th-century gateway, a reminder of the long-vanished priory. The old west doors still show the marks of shots fired during the English Civil War.

Inside the church, the highlight is the intricate 14th-century screen, with five open bays. The roof is a sympathetic restoration dating from 1871 of the Perpendicular original. There are several funerary monuments and floor brasses. Among the possessions of the church is the Fayrey Pall, a 15th-century embroidered cloth.

The wall at the east end of the church - which had been inserted between the nave and crossing when Dunstable Priory was dissolved in the 16th century - was rebuilt in 1962. Designed by the architect Felix James Lander, the work was carried out by posthumously his son Sean Lander. The design introduced two round-arched windows with Perpendicular tracery into the upper east wall of the chancel where none had existed before. These were filled with stained glass commissioned from the artist Christopher Webb. That to the north shows St John the Baptist, St Peter and St Martin of Tours across its three lights. In the window to the south, Webb depicted images of St Fremund, St James the Great, and St Nicholas.

All of the stained glass in the church dates to the 20th century. The oldest is a window in the south aisle was installed during the second half of the 1920s and shows the Madonna and Child, commissioned in memory of Charles and May Binns. It was designed by Archibald John Davies of the Bromsgrove Guild of Applied Arts. Aside from this and the two 1962 windows in the east chancel wall designed by Christopher Webb, all of the other stained glass in the church is the work of the artist John Hayward, who designed 11 windows across three separate commissions. The two windows in the west wall above the entrance portal were installed in 1972 and take as their subject the royal and ecclesiastical history of Dunstable Priory. In 1984 Hayward produced three windows for the Lady Chapel depicting the Annunciation, Visitation and Nativity. The six windows by Hayward in the nave were all installed in 1989. In the south aisle are three windows depicting scenes from the life of St Peter. In the north aisle are depictions of Baptism, the Eucharist and the Fayrey Pall.

== Burials ==
- Neil Loring

== Priory House ==
On the dissolution of the monasteries the Priory's guest house became a private house from 1545. One of the earliest owners was the important local Crawley family who used part of the building as an early hospital for the mentally ill. In 1743 the original stone vaulted hall was incorporated into a much larger house with the Georgian facade. The Town Council converted the building into a Heritage and Tourist Information Centre. Priory House is a Grade II listed building.

== See also ==
- List of monastic houses in Bedfordshire
- List of English abbeys, priories and friaries serving as parish churches
- Grade I listed buildings in Bedfordshire

== Notes ==
- This article incorporates text from The Priory of Dunstable, in The Victoria History of the County of Bedford: Volume 1, 1904.
