= Oriental Club =

Private members' club in London, England

Coordinates: 51.5154°N 0.1494°W

- Founded: 1824; 202 years ago
- Type: Private members' club
- Purpose: East India Company civil and military officers who served in the East
- Headquarters: Stratford House
- Location: London, England
- Website: orientalclub.org.uk

The Oriental Club in London is a private members' club that was established in 1824. Charles Graves described it in 1963 as fine in quality as White's but with the space of infinitely larger clubs. It is now located in Stratford House in Stratford Place, near Oxford Street and Bond Street. It has been rated as a prestigious club.

== Foundation ==
The Asiatic Journal and Monthly Miscellany reported in its April 1824, issue:

An Oriental Club has just been established in London, of which the Duke of Wellington is President, and upwards of forty individuals of rank and talent connected with our Eastern empire are appointed a Committee. The following is the Prospectus... The Oriental club will be established at a house in a convenient situation. The utmost economy shall be observed in the whole establishment, and the subscription for its foundation and support shall not exceed fifteen pounds entrance, and six pounds per annum. There will be a commodious reading room... A library will be gradually formed, chiefly of works on oriental subjects. The coffee room of the club will be established on the most economical principles, similar to those of the United Service and Union. There will be occasional house dinners. The qualifications for members of this club are, having been resident or employed in the public service of His Majesty, or the East-India Company, in any part of the East – belonging to the Royal Asiatic Society – being officially connected with our Eastern Governments at home or abroad... The British Empire in the East is now so extensive, and the persons connected with it so numerous, that the establishment of an institution where they may meet on a footing of social intercourse, seems particularly desirable. It is the chief object of the Oriental club to promote that intercourse...

The founders included the Duke of Wellington and General Sir John Malcolm, and in 1824 all the Presidencies and Provinces of British India were still controlled by the Honourable East India Company.

== History and membership ==
The early years of the club, from 1824 to 1858, are detailed in a book by Stephen Wheeler published in 1925, which contains a paragraph on each member of the club of that period.

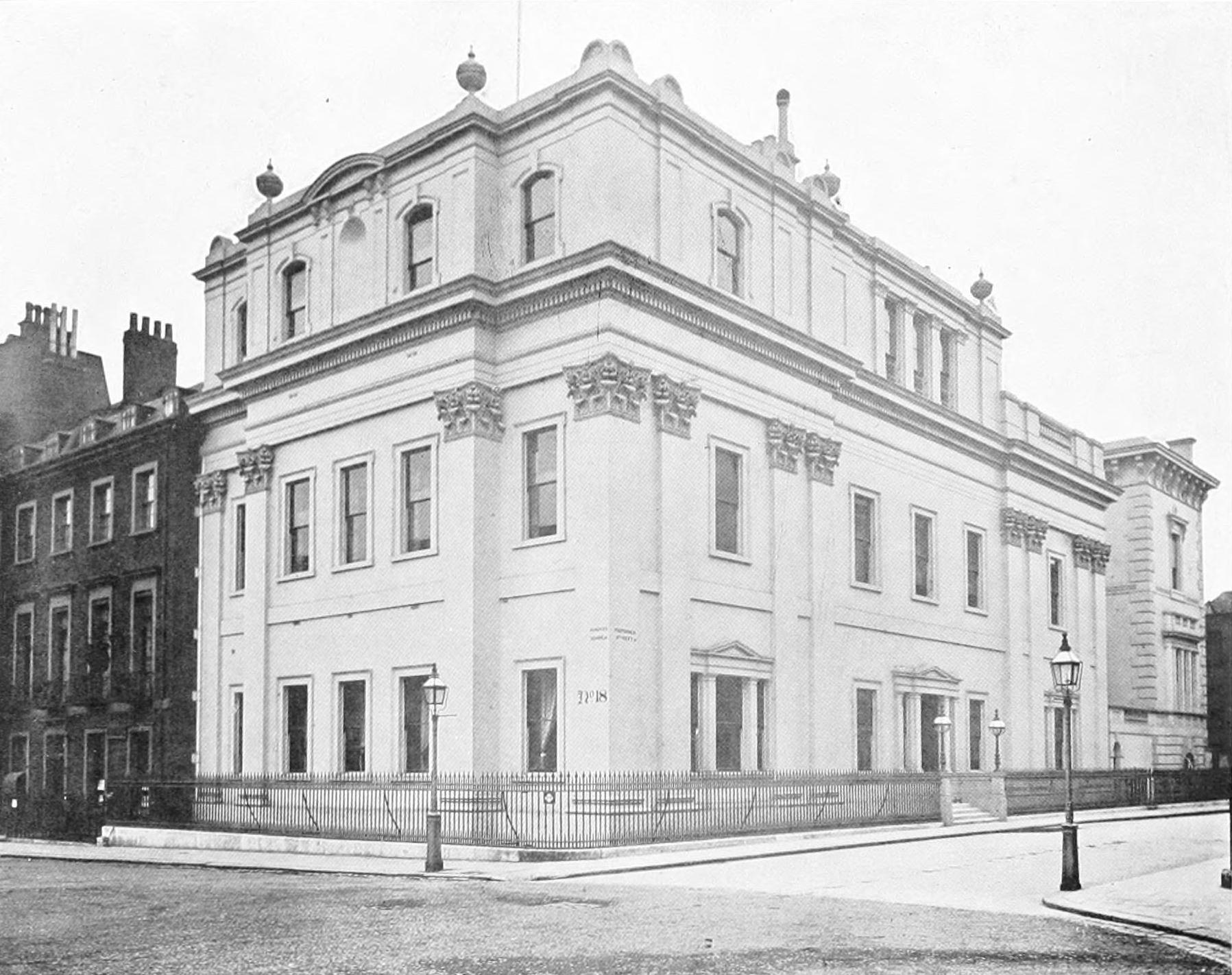
The clubhouse at 18 Hanover Square, designed in 1827 by Benjamin Dean Wyatt. The club sold the building in 1962.

James Grant said of the club in The Great Metropolis (1837):

The Oriental Club, corner of Hanover Square, consists of gentlemen who have resided some time in the East. A great majority of its members are persons who are living at home on fortunes they have amassed in India. India and Indian matters form the everlasting topics of their conversation. I have often thought it would be worth the while of some curious person to count the number of times the words Calcutta, Bombay and Madras are pronounced by the members in the course of a day. The admission money to the Oriental Club is twenty pounds, the annual subscription is eight pounds. The number of members is 550. The finances of the Oriental are in a flourishing state, the receipts last year amounted to 5,609l, while the expenditure was only 4,923l, thus leaving a balance in favour of the club of 685l... at this rate they will get more rapidly out of debt than clubs usually do... Nabobs are usually remarkable for the quantity of snuff they take; the account against the club for this article is so small that they must be sparing in the use of it; it only averages 17l. 10s. per annum. Possibly, however, most of the members are in the habit of carrying boxes of their own...

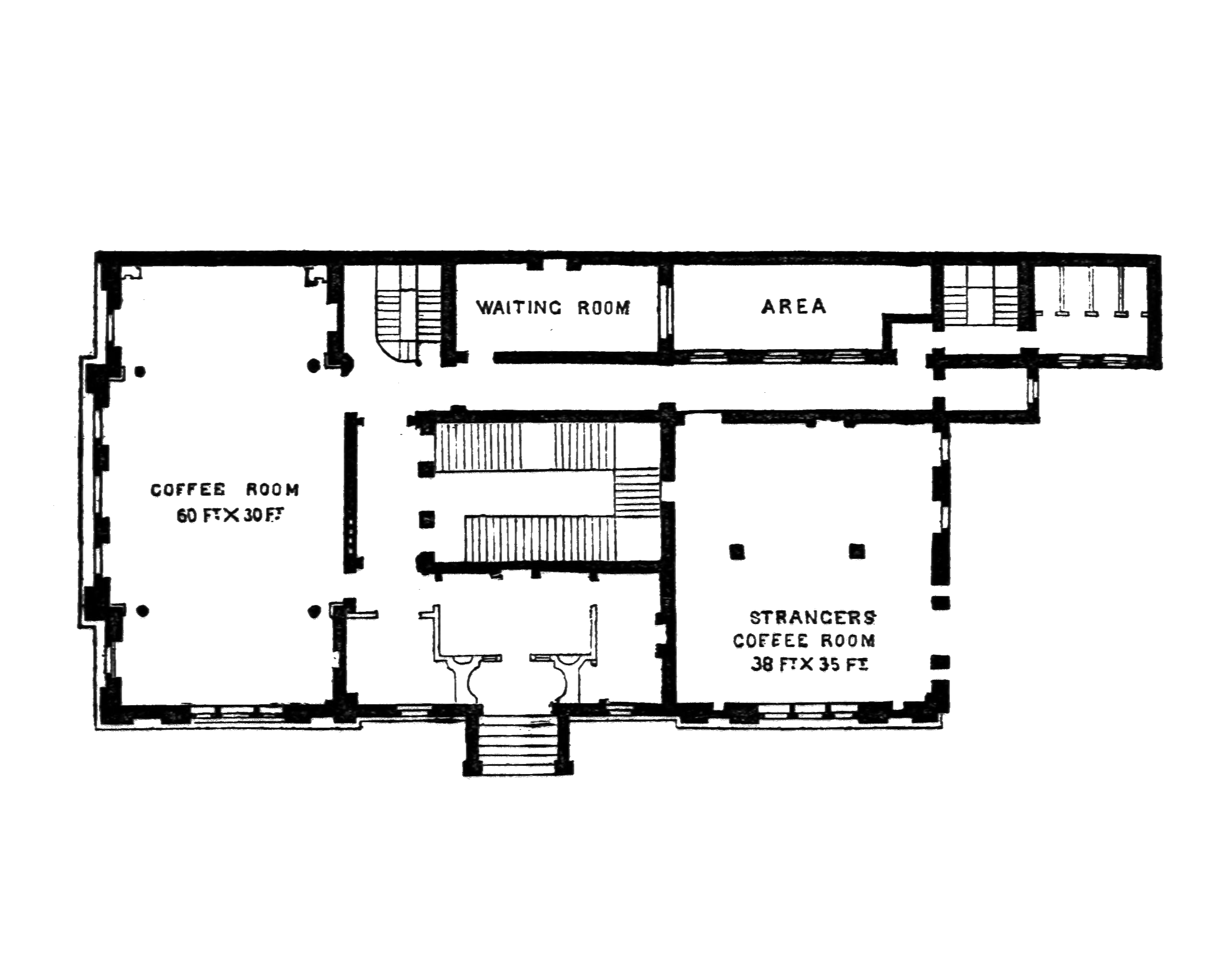
Floor plan of the Hanover Square clubhouse

The old Smoking Room is adorned with an elaborate ram's head snuff box complete with snuff rake and spoons, though most members have forgotten its original function.

On 29 July 1844, two heroes of the First Anglo-Afghan War, Sir William Nott and Sir Robert Sale, were elected as members of the club by the Committee as an "extraordinary tribute of respect and anticipating the unanimous sentiment of the Club".

On 12 January 1846, a special meeting at the club in Hanover Square presided over by George Eden, 1st Earl of Auckland, a former Governor-General of India, paid a public tribute to the dying Charles Metcalfe, 1st Baron Metcalfe, which Sir James Weir Hogg described as "a wreath upon his bier".

With the formation of the East India Club in 1849, the link with the Honourable East India Company began to decline.

In 1850, Peter Cunningham wrote in his Hand-Book of London:

ORIENTAL CLUB, 18, HANOVER SQUARE, founded 1824, by Sir John Malcolm, and is composed of noblemen and gentlemen who have travelled or resided in Asia, at St Helena, in Egypt, at the Cape of Good Hope, the Mauritius, or at Constantinople; or whose official situations connect them with the administration of our Eastern government abroad or at home. Entrance money, 20l.; annual subscription 8l. The Club possesses some good portraits of Clive, Stringer Lawrence, Sir Eyre Coote, Sir David Ochterloney, Sir G. Pollock, Sir W. Nott, Mountstuart Elphinstone, Henry Pottinger, Duke of Wellington, &c.

In 1861, the club's Chef de cuisine, Richard Terry, published his book Indian Cookery, stating that his recipes were "gathered, not only from my own knowledge of cookery, but from Native Cooks".

Charles Dickens Jr. reported in Dickens's Dictionary of London (1879):

Oriental Club is "composed of noblemen, M.P.'s, and gentlemen of the first distinction and character." The Committee elect by ballot, twelve are a quorum, and three black balls exclude. Entrance fee, £31; subscription, £8 8s

Dickens appears to have been quoting the club's own Rules and Regulations; that phrase appears there in 1889, when the total number of members was limited to eight hundred. When Lytton Strachey joined the club in 1922, at the age of forty-two, he wrote to Virginia Woolf

Do you know that I have joined the Oriental Club? One becomes 65, with an income of 5,000 a year, directly one enters it ... . Just the place for me, you see, in my present condition. I pass almost unnoticed with my glazed eyes and white hair, as I sink into a leather chair heavily, with a copy of The Field in hand. Excellent claret, too – one of the best cellars in London, by Jove!

Stephen Wheeler's 1925 book Annals of the Oriental Club, 1824–1858 also contains a list of the members of the club in the year 1924, with their years of election and their places of residence.

In 1927, R. A. Rye wrote of the club's library – "The library of the Oriental Club ... contains about 4,700 volumes, mostly on oriental subjects", while in 1928 Louis Napoleon Parker mentioned in his autobiography "... the bald and venerable heads of the members of the Oriental Club, perpetually reading The Morning Post.

In 1934, the novelist Alec Waugh wrote of

the colonial administrator's renunciation of the pomp of official dignities for the obscurity of a chair beside the fireplace in the Oriental Club.

Another writer recalling the club in the 1970s says:

Inside were a motley collection of ageing colonials, ex-Bankers, ex-directors of Commonwealth corporations, retired Tea estate owners from Coorg and Shillong and Darjeeling, the odd Maharajah in a Savile Row suit, and certainly a number of Asiatics entitled to be addressed as Your Excellencies.

== Club houses ==
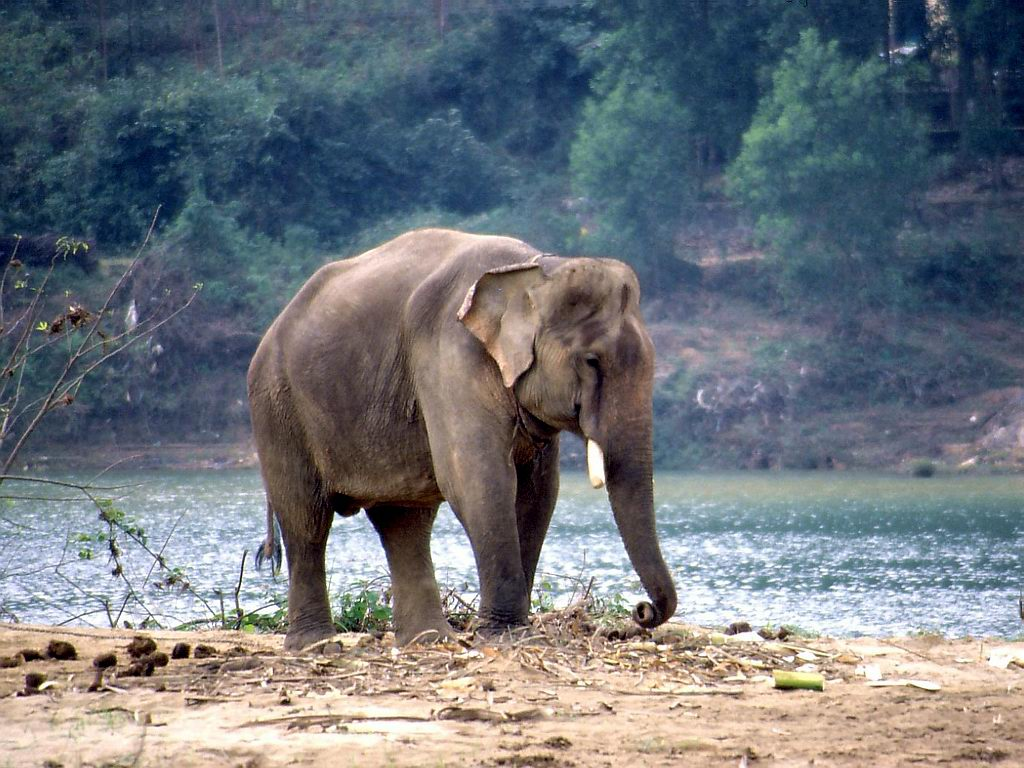
The Indian elephant is the symbol of the club.

In its monthly issue for June 1824, The Asiatic Journal reported that "The Oriental Club expect to open their house, No. 16, Lower Grosvenor Street, early in June. The Members, in the mean time, are requested to send their names to the Secretary as above, and to pay their admission fee and first year's subscription to the bankers, Messrs Martin, Call and Co., Bond Street."

The club's first purpose-built club house, in Hanover Square, was constructed in 1827–1828 and designed by Philip Wyatt and his brother Benjamin Dean Wyatt. The construction of additions to the Clubhouse that were designed by Decimus Burton, in 1853, was superintended, when eventually commenced, in 1871, by his nephew Henry Marley Burton.

Edward Walford, in his Old and New London (Volume 4, 1878) wrote of this building

At the north-west angle of the square, facing Tenterden Street, is the Oriental Club, founded about the year 1825... The building is constructed after the manner of club-houses in general, having only one tier of windows above the ground-floor. The interior received some fresh embellishment about the year 1850, some of the rooms and ceilings having been decorated in a superior style by Collman, and it contains some fine portraits of Indian and other celebrities, such as Lord Clive, Nott, Pottinger, Sir Eyre Coote, &c. This club is jocosely called by one of the critics of 'Michael Angelo Titmarsh' the "horizontal jungle" off Hanover Square.

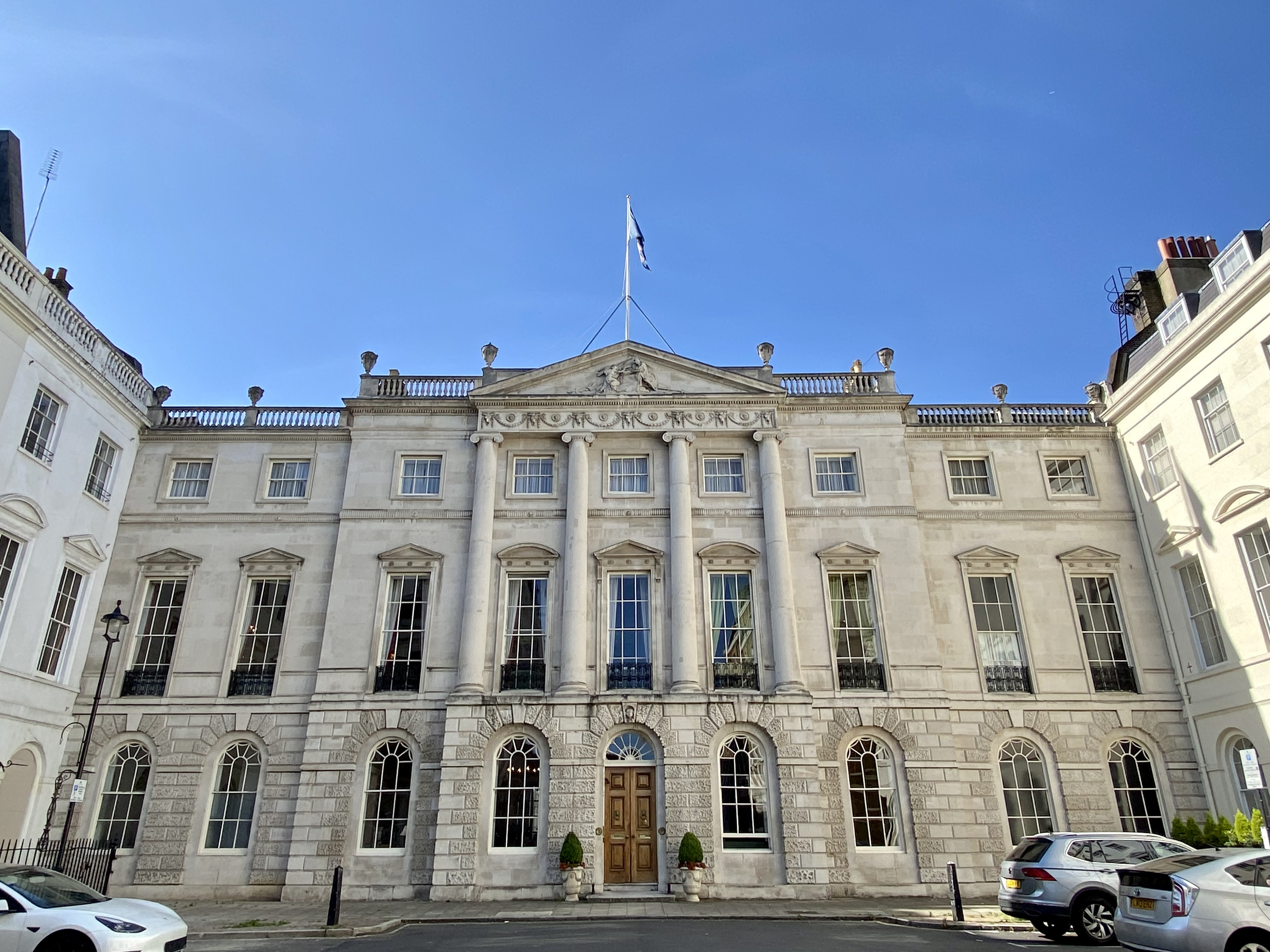
Stratford House, which has been the club's home since 1962

The club remained in Hanover Square until 1961. The club house there was in use for the last time on 30 November 1961. Early in 1962, the club moved into its present club house, Stratford House in Stratford Place, just off Oxford Street, London W1C, having bought the property for conversion in 1960.

The central range of Stratford House was designed by Robert Adam and was built between 1770 and 1776 for Edward Stratford, 2nd Earl of Aldborough, who paid £4,000 for the site. It had previously been the location of the Lord Mayor of London's Banqueting House, built in 1565. The house remained in the Stratford family until 1832. It belonged briefly to Grand Duke Nicholas Nikolaevich, a son of Tsar Nicholas I of Russia. The house was little altered until 1894, when its then owner, Murray Guthrie, added a second storey to the east and west wings and a colonnade in front. In 1903, a new owner, the Liberal politician Sir Edward Colebrook, later Lord Colebrooke, reconstructed the Library to an Adam design. In 1908, Lord Derby bought a lease and began more alterations, removing the colonnade and adding a third storey to both wings. He took out the original bifurcated staircase (replacing it with a less elegant single one), demolished the stables and built a Banqueting Hall with a grand ballroom above.

In 1960, the Club began to convert its new property. The ballroom was turned into two floors of new bedrooms, further lifts were added, and the banqueting hall was divided into a dining room and other rooms. The club now has a main drawing room, as well as others, a members' bar, a library and an ante-room, a billiards room, an internet suite and business room, and two (non)smoking rooms, as well as a dining room and 32 bedrooms.

Stratford House is a Grade I listed building.

The flag flying above the club house bears an Indian elephant, which is the badge of the club.

== Art collection ==
The club possesses a fine collection of paintings, including many early portraits of Britons in India such as Warren Hastings. The Bar is overlooked by a painting of Tipu Sultan, the Tiger of Mysore (1750–1799). There are portraits of the club's principal founders, the first Duke of Wellington (by H. W. Pickersgill) and Sir John Malcolm (by Samuel Lane). Other portraits include Lord Cornwallis (1738–1805), also by Samuel Lane, Sir Jamsetjee Jeejebhoy, 1st Baronet (1783–1859), by John Smart, Clive of India (1725–1774) by Nathaniel Dance-Holland, Major-General Stringer Lawrence by Sir Joshua Reynolds, Major General Sir Thomas Munro, 1st Baronet (1761–1827), by Ramsay Richard Reinagle, Edward Stratford, second Earl of Aldborough (died 1801) by Mather Brown, Mehemet Ali, Pasha of Egypt (c. 1769–1849) and General Sir William Nott, both by Thomas Brigstocke, Henry Petty-Fitzmaurice, 5th Marquess of Lansdowne (1845–1927) by Sydney P. Kenrick after John Singer Sargent, Lieutenant-General Sir Richard Strachey (1817–1908) by Lowes Dickinson (the bequest of his widow, Jane Maria Strachey), Charles Metcalfe, 1st Baron Metcalfe by F. R. Say, Thomas Snodgrass by an unknown artist, and a bust of the first Lord Lake.

In 2014 the Club came under criticism for refusing to admit a cellist with her baby.

== President of the club ==
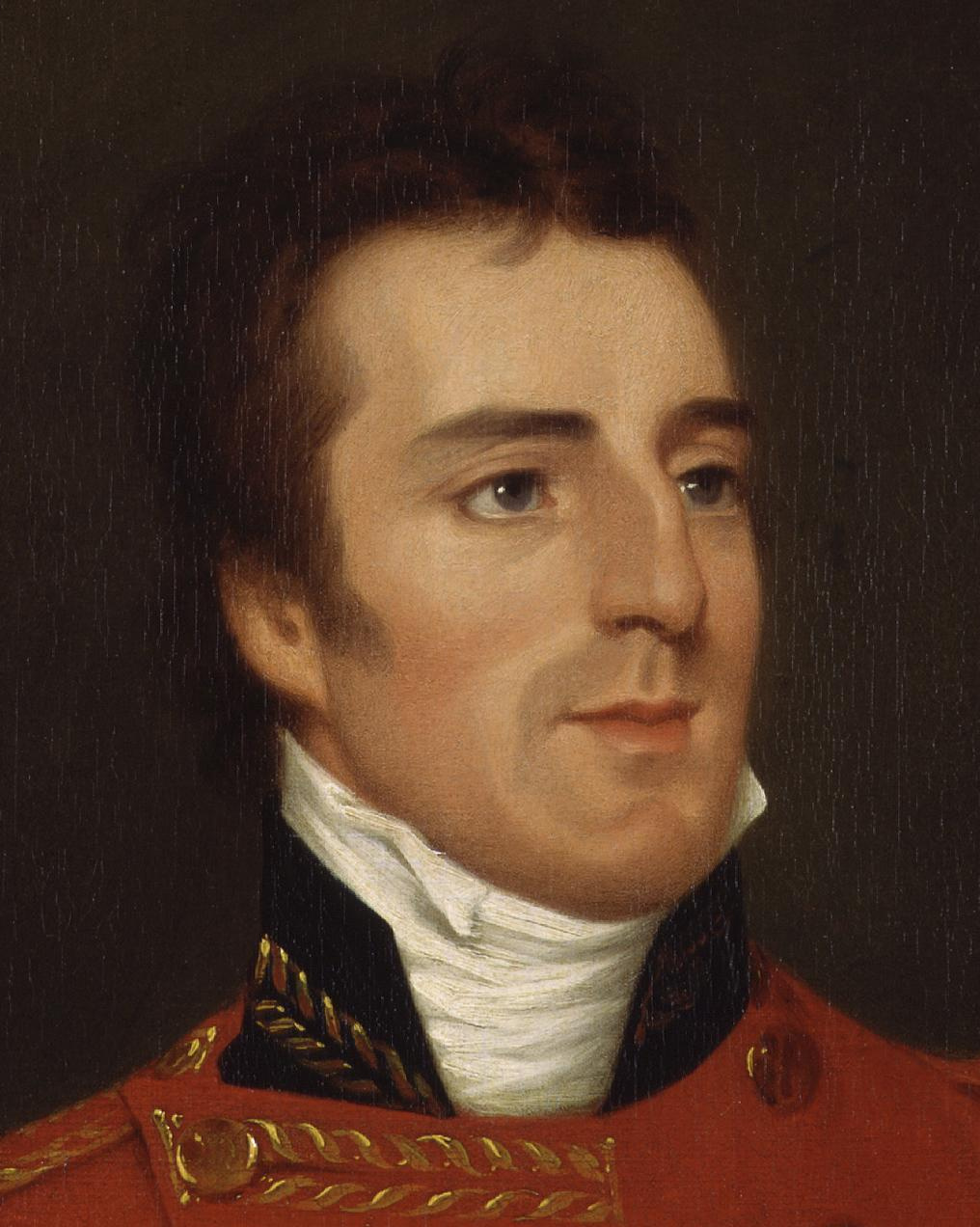
The Duke of Wellington, first and only President of the club

- 1824–1852: Arthur Wellesley, 1st Duke of Wellington (Honorary President)

After Wellington's death in 1852, no further presidents were appointed.

== Chairmen of the committee ==
- 1837: Sir Pulteney Malcolm GCB RN (brother of the founder, Sir John Malcolm)
- 1838: George William Cox
- 1839 and 1844-1845: Rt. Hon. Holt Mackenzie
- 1840: Field Marshal Sir George Pollock, 1st Baronet
- 1841: Sir Herbert Abingdon Draper Compton (Chief Justice of the Supreme Court of Bombay, Advocate-General of Madras and Calcutta)
- 1843: Sir Edward Colebrooke, 4th Baronet, MP
- 1846: G. W. Traill (namesake of Traill's Pass)
- 1853: Lestock Robert Reid (Governor of Bombay, 1846-1847)
- 1867-1868: Lieutenant-General Sir George St Patrick Lawrence
- 1872: Sir Cecil Beadon KCSI (Lieutenant-Governor of the Bengal Presidency 1862-1866)
- 1877-1878 and 1880: Major-General Christopher Palmer Rigby (British Consul in Zanzibar, 1858-1860)
- 1881: Sir George Francis Welsh Kellner KCMG CSI
- 1882: General Sir Henry Edward Landor Thuillier (Surveyor General of India, 1861-1878)
- 1883-1884, 1886-1888, 1891-1892: James Adair Crawford (Chief political resident of the Persian Gulf, acting Chief Commissioner of Balochistan)
- 1918: C. A. MacDonald
- 1931-1932, 1936, 1938-1940: Sir Henry Wheeler (Governor of Bihar and Orissa 1922-1927, member of the Council of India 1927-1937)
- 1932–1933: Sir Reginald Mant
- 1941: Sir Alfred Donald "Pickle" Pickford OBE
- 1951: Sir Charles Alexander Innes KCSI CIE (Governor of Burma, 1927–1932)
- 1956: Sir Arthur Morse KBE JP (Head of The Hongkong and Shanghai Banking Corporation)
- 1954 and 1958–1962: Sir Arthur Bruce
- 1966-1967: Geoffrey Stephen Bozman CIE CSI
- 1968: Sir Percival Joseph Griffiths KBE CIE

== Founding committee ==
The first club committee of 1824 included:

- Lord William Bentinck GCB (1774–1839)
- Charles Williams-Wynn MP (1775–1850)
- Field Marshal Sir Alured Clarke GCB (1744–1832)
- Field Marshal Sir George Nugent, Bt GCB (1757–1849)
- Vice-Admiral Sir Richard King, Bt (1774–1834)
- Vice-Admiral Sir Pulteney Malcolm KCB (1768–1838)
- Major General Sir John Malcolm GCB KLS (1769–1833)
- Sir George Staunton Bt, MP (1781–1859)
- Sir Charles Forbes, 1st Baronet MP
- Sir Thomas Hislop, 1st Baronet
- General Sir Miles Nightingall KCB, MP
- Major General Sir Patrick Ross GCMG KCH (1778–1850)
- Sir Robert Townsend Farquhar, 1st Baronet MP (1776-1830)
- Captain Sir Christopher Cole KCB, MP (1770-1836)
- Lieutenant General Malcolm Grant (1762-1831)
- Major General Robert Haldane, CB (d. 1826)
- Vice Admiral Robert Stuart Lambert (1771-1836)
- Major General Charles Rumley
- General Sir William Tuyll KCH (Baron de Tuyll) (d. 1864)
- Lieutenant Colonel William Charles Alston
- Colonel John Baillie of Leys MP (1772-1833)
- Alexander Boswell, Esq.

== Other notable members ==
- Lieutenant-General Sir Alexander Campbell, 1st Baronet, GCB (1760–1824)
- Sir Samuel Young, 1st Baronet (1766-1826), colonial administrator
- Major-General Sir Thomas Munro, 1st Baronet KCB (1761-1827), Scottish East India Company Army officer, governor of Madras Presidency
- Vice-Admiral Sir Henry Blackwood, 1st Baronet (1770–1832)
- Pownoll Pellew, 2nd Viscount Exmouth (1786–1833)
- Andrew Blayney, 11th Baron Blayney (1770-1834)
- Lieutenant General Sir John Colquhoun Grant KCB GCH (1772–1835), cavalry general
- Lieutenant General Sir Edward Barnes, GCB (1776-1838), Governor of Ceylon
- Henry Peachey, 3rd Baron Selsey (1787-1838), Royal Navy officer and peer
- Edward Clive, 1st Earl of Powis (1754-1839), Governor of Madras from 1798 to 1803
- Lord William Bentinck (1774-1839), first Governor-General of India from 1834 to 1835
- Omar/Omer Effendi (fl. 1830-1840s), Cambridge-educated Egyptian Ottoman diplomat, protégé of Muhammad Ali of Egypt and aide-de-camp to his son Ibrahim Pasha
- Neil Benjamin Edmonstone (1765-1841), civil servant in and director of the East India Company
- Lieutenant-General Sir Samuel Ford Whittingham (1772-1841), British and Spanish army officer during the Napoleonic Wars
- Sir Francis William Forbes (1784-1841), Chief Justice of Newfoundland, and the first Chief Justice of New South Wales
- Captain Sir Alexander Burnes FRS (1805-1841), Scottish military officer and diplomat associated with the Great Game and the exploration of Bukhara; murdered by a mob in Kabul in 1841
- General Sir Lionel Smith, 1st Baronet (1778-1842), Governor of Tobago (1833), Governor of Barbados (1833–1836), Governor of Jamaica (1836-1839), Governor of Mauritius (1840-1842)
- George FitzClarence, 1st Earl of Munster (1794–1842), son of King William IV
- Sir Francis Workman-Macnaghten, 1st Baronet (1763-1843), Anglo-Irish judge in India
- General Sir Archibald Campbell, 1st Baronet GCB (1769-1843), commander of British forces in the First Anglo-Burmese War
- Sir Hudson Lowe GCMG (1769–1844) (1769-1844), governor of Saint Helena from 1816 to 1821, jailor of Napoleon in exile
- Sir William Nott (1782–1845), distinguished soldier of the First Anglo-Afghan War, by special election
- Sir Robert Sale (1782–1845), distinguished soldier of the First Anglo-Afghan War, by special election
- Admiral Sir Philip Charles Durham, GCB (1763-1845), Royal Navy officer in the American War of Independence, French Revolutionary War, and Napoleonic Wars
- Sir James Rivett-Carnac, 1st Baronet (1784–1846), statesman and politician, Governor of the Bombay Presidency from 1838 to 1841
- Charles Metcalfe, 1st Baron Metcalfe (1785-1846), acting Governor-General of India, Governor of Jamaica and Governor General of the Province of Canada
- Dwarkanath Tagore (1794–1846), early Indian industrialist and grandfather of Rabindranath Tagore
- Lieutenant-general Sir John Doveton GCB, CBE (1768-1847), military officer in the Madras Army
- Lieutenant-General Sir Colin Campbell KCB (1776–1847), Governor of British Ceylon, 1841-1847
- Sir William Young, 1st Baronet (d. 1848), politician and landowner, owner of Bailieborough Castle
- George Eden, 1st Earl of Auckland (1784–1849), Governor-General of India 1835–1842
- Shahzada Muhammad Jamal-ud-din Sultan Sahib (Prince Jamh O Deen of Mysore (1795-1842), 12th son of Tipu Sultan, the "Tiger of Mysore", whose portrait hangs in the bar
- Lord George Bentinck (1802-1848), Conservative politician and racehorse owner
- General Sir Edward Paget GCB (1775-1849), Groom of the Bedchamber to George IV; Governor of Ceylon, 1822; Commander-in-Chief, India, 1823-1825
- Major-General Prince Waldemar of Prussia (1817-1849)
- Major-General Sir Ephraim Gerrish Stannus (1784-1850), military officer in the service of the East India Company
- Thomas Fletcher Waghorn (1800-1850), naval officer and explorer, pioneer of an overland route to India through Egypt
- Henry St George Tucker (1771–1851), financier and official of the East India Company
- James Ruddell-Todd (1783-1852), MP for Honiton
- Sir Thomas Metcalfe, 4th Baronet (1795-1853), brother of Lord Metcalfe, agent of the Governor General of India at the court of Mughal Emperor Bahadur Shah Zafar
- William Beresford, 1st Viscount Beresford (1768–1854)
- Lieutenant-General Sir Henry Pottinger, 1st Baronet, GCB, PC (1789-1856), Anglo-Irish soldier and colonial administrator, first Governor of Hong Kong
- Walter Henry Medhurst (1796-1857), Congregationalist missionary to China, early translator of the Bible into Chinese
- Sir Henry Strachey, 2nd Baronet (1772–1858)
- Sir James Law Lushington GCB (1779-1859), MP
- Mountstuart Elphinstone (1779–1859), Governor of Bombay and author
- Sir Jamsetjee Jeejebhoy, 1st Baronet (1783–1859), Indian-Parsi merchant and philanthropist
- William Butterworth Bayley (1782-1860), director and chairman of the British East India Company, acting Governor-General of India, 1828
- John Elphinstone, 13th Lord Elphinstone, 1st Baron Elphinstone, GCB, GCH, PC (1807-1860), Governor of Madras and Bombay, Privy Counsellor, and Scottish representative peer
- William Henry Carmichael-Smyth (1780-1861), military officer in the service of the East India Company, stepfather of William Makepeace Thackeray
- General Sir Robert Houstoun (1780-1862), military officer in the service of the East India Company
- Laurence Oliphant (1791-1862), 8th Laird of Condie and 30th Chief of Clan Oliphant, MP for Perth, 1832-1837
- Count Eduard von Oriola (1809-1862), Prussian Lieutenant-General
- Lieutenant-General Sir James Outram, 1st Baronet (1803-1863), significant figure in the Indian Rebellion of 1857
- Ahmed Nazım Bey (d. 1863), Ottoman Commissioner to the 1862 International Exhibition, eldest son of Mehmed Fuad Pasha, Grand Vizier of the Ottoman Empire
- Sir John Spencer Login (1809-1863), Scottish surgeon, guardian of fellow member Maharajah Duleep Singh and the Koh-i-Noor diamond
- Sa'id of Egypt (1822-1863), Khedive of Egypt
- Lieutenant-General William Monteith (1790-1864), soldier, diplomatist and historian associated with the East India Company
- George "Squire" Osbaldeston (1786-1866), Member of Parliament and sportsman
- General Sir George de Lacy Evans GCB (1787–1870), Irish officer in the British Army and Member of Parliament
- Sir Thomas Herbert Maddock (1792-1870), colonial administrator and MP
- John Wood (1812-1871), Scottish naval officer, cartographer, and explorer of Central Asia
- Shahzada Sir Ghulam Muhammad Sultan Sahib, KCSI (1795-1872), 14th son and successor of Tipu Sultan, the "Tiger of Mysore", whose portrait hangs in the bar
- Count Adolf Lauer von Münchhofen (1795-1874), Prussian Major-General
- Sir James Ranald Martin (1796-1874), military surgeon in Colonial India, early critic of deforestation
- Alexis-François Rio (1797-1874), French art historian
- Lieutenant-General Sir Archdale Wilson, 1st Baronet, GCB (1803-1874), Bengal Army and British Army artillery officer, veteran of the Second Sikh War and the Indian Rebellion of 1857, Colonel Commandant of the Royal Artillery
- Sir Edward Ryan PC FRS (1793-1875), lawyer, judge, reformer of the British Civil Service and patron of science. Chief Justice of Bengal, 1833–1843
- Sir John Gardner Wilkinson (1797–1875), traveller, writer and pioneer Egyptologist of the 19th century, "the Father of British Egyptology"
- General John Briggs (1785–1875), officer in the army of the East India Company, Persian scholar
- Sir James Hogg, 1st Baronet (1790-1876), Irish-born businessman, lawyer and politician and Chairman of the East India Company
- Julius von Mohl (1800-1876), German Orientalist
- Sir Thomas Henry (1807-1876), Anglo-Irish police magistrate, originator of the English law of extradition
- Mohan Lal Kashmiri (1812-1877), Indian traveler, diplomat, and author, player in the Great Game
- Alfred Burton (1802-1877), Mayor of Hastings, and son of the pre-eminent property developer James Burton. Alfred Burton was a long-standing member of the club, to which he donated numerous books and pictures, and to which his brother Decimus Burton and nephew Henry Marley Burton made architectural additions
- John Lawrence, 1st Baron Lawrence (1811-1879), Viceroy of India 1864-1869
- John Hutt (1795-1880), Governor of Western Australia 1839-1846
- Sir Theophilus John Metcalfe, 5th Baronet (1828-1883), civil servant of the East India Company in Bengal
- Mansur Ali Khan, last Nawab of Bengal (1830–1884)
- The Honourable Robert Grimston (1816-1884), amateur cricketer and a pioneer of electric telegraphy
- John Farley Leith QC, MP (1808-1887), barrister and Liberal politician
- Sir Robert Montgomery GCSI, KCB (1809-1887), Chief Commissioner of Oudh 1858-1859, Lieutenant Governor of Punjab 1859-1865
- Iqbal al-Daula Bahadur (1808–1888), pretender to the throne of Oudh, grandson of Saadat Ali Khan II, the sixth Nawab
- Field Marshal Robert Cornelis Napier, 1st Baron Napier of Magdala (1810-1890), veteran of campaigns in India and China, leader of the British Expedition to Abyssinia
- Major-General Sir Frederick Abbott, CB (1805-1892), British Indian Army officer and engineer of the East India Company
- Sir John Peter Grant, GCMG, KCB (1807-1893), Lieutenant-Governor of Bengal (1859–1862) and as Governor of Jamaica
- Maharaja Sir Duleep Singh, GCSI (1838-1893), youngest son of Ranjit Singh (the "Lion of Punjab"), last Maharaja of the Sikh Empire
- General Sir George Balfour KCB (1809-1894), British Army officer and Liberal MP 1872-1892
- Patrick Smollett (1804-1895), Conservative Party politician, MP for Dunbartonshire and Cambridge
- Edmund Drummond (1814-1895), Lieutenant-Governor of the North-Western Provinces, 1863-1868
- Thomas Powys, 4th Baron Lilford (1833-1896), peer and ornithologist
- William Tozer (1829–1899), colonial bishop
- St. George Jackson Mivart (1827-1900), biologist and critic of natural selection
- Field Marshal Sir Neville Bowles Chamberlain GCSI (1820-1902), Commander-in-chief of the Madras Army
- Sir Richard Temple, 1st Baronet (1826-1902), Governor of Bombay from 1877 to 1880, Conservative MP for Evesham
- Sir Donald Horne Macfarlane (1830-1904), Scottish East India merchant and MP
- Sir John Strachey GCSI CIE (1823-1907), Lieutenant-Governor of the North-Western Provinces, acting Governor-General in February 1872
- Lieutenant-General Sir Richard Strachey, GCSI FRS FRGS (1817–1908), colonial administrator, soldier, and scientist, President of the Royal Geographical Society
- Robert Needham Cust (1821-1909), British administrator, judge, and scholar in colonial India
- Sir George Sutherland Mackenzie KCMG (1844-1910) British businessman and explorer
- Henry George Keene CIE (1826-1915), civil servant, historian of medieval and modern India
- Sir William Chichele Plowden KCSI (1832-1915), member of the Imperial Legislative Council, Liberal MP
- Colonel Dugald McTavish Lumsden CB (1851-1915), Scottish-born British army officer, founder of Indian cavalry unit Lumsden's Horse in the Second Boer War
- Sir Henry Meredyth Chichele Plowden (1840-1920), India-born first-class cricketer, barrister and judge
- George Ernest Morrison (1862-1920), Australian journalist, book collector, and representative of the Republic of China during World War I
- Sir Edward Cooper, 1st Baronet (1848-1922), Lord Mayor of London 1919-1920
- Sir Allan Arthur (1857-1923), Scottish international rugby player, civil servant, and India merchant; Sheriff of Kolkata, 1890
- Sir Fielding Clarke (1851-1928), colonial barrister, civil servant and jurist. Chief Justice of Fiji, Hong Kong and Jamaica
- Sir Ludovic Charles Porter KCSI, KCIE, OBE (1869-1928), colonial administrator
- Sir Ernest Mason Satow, GCMG, PC (1843-1929), diplomat, scholar, and Japanologist
- Sir William Thomas Taylor, KCMG (1848-1931), Accountant General and Controller of Revenue of Ceylon, Colonial Secretary of Singapore, Resident-General for the Federated Malay States
- James Lyle Mackay, 1st Earl of Inchcape (1852–1932)
- Lytton Strachey (1880-1932), writer and critic, founding member of the Bloomsbury Group and author of Eminent Victorians
- Sir Francis Joseph Edward Spring KCIE FIMechE (1849-1933), Anglo-Irish civil engineer and member of the Imperial Legislative Council; pioneer of the Indian Railways
- Colonel Kumar Sri Sir Ranjitsinhji Vibhaji II (1872-1933), 12th Jam Sahib of Nawanagar and cricketer
- Sir Robert Warrand Carlyle KCSI CIE (1859-1934), medieval historian and India civil servant; Inspector-General of Bengal Police
- Sir Archibald Birkmyre, 1st Baronet (1875–1935), Scottish jute manufacturer and India merchant
- Sir Stanley Bois (1864-1938), businessman in Ceylon
- Sir John Prescott Hewett GCSI, KBE, CIE, GCSStJ (1854-1941), Lieutenant Governor of the United Provinces of Agra and Oudh and Conservative MP for Luton
- John Powys, 5th Baron Lilford (1863-1945), peer and cricketer
- Sir Edward Rosling (1863-1946), politician and tea planter in Ceylon
- Sir Percy Elly Bates, 4th Baronet (1879-1946), shipping magnate, Chairman of the Cunard Line
- Sir Gordon Gordon-Taylor CB KBE FRCS FACS (1878-1960), Surgeon Rear-Admiral in the Royal Navy
- Sir Robert Gordon Menzies (1894-1978), 12th Prime Minister of Australia, 1939-1941 and 1949-1966
- Sir Narayana Raghavan Pillai of Elenkath, KCIE, CBE, ICS (1898-1992) Former Governor of the Bank of India & Secretary of State; grandson of Nanoo Pillai of Elenkath, Diwan of Travancore
- Sir Alec Ogilvie (1913-1997), Calcutta businessman
- Sir Charles Philip Haddon-Cave KBE CMG (1925-1999), Chief Secretary of Hong Kong, 1971-1981
- Sir John Jardine Paterson (1920–2000), Calcutta businessman
- Austen Kark (1926–2002), managing director of the BBC World Service
- John Burton Buckley, 3rd Baron Wrenbury (1927-2014)
- Sir George Martin (1926-2016), producer of The Beatles
- Sir David Tang KBE (1954-2017), Hong Kong and London businessman
- William Charles Langdon Brown CBE (b. 1931-2024), banker and former Member of the Hong Kong Legislative Council
- Francis Grosvenor, 8th Earl of Wilton (b. 1934)
- Simon Mackay, Baron Tanlaw (b. 1934), businessman, horologist, grandson of Sir Charles Vyner Brooke, last White Rajah of Sarawak and his wife the Ranee Sylvia
- Sir Mark Tully (b. 1936-2026) former Chief of Bureau, BBC, New Delhi
- Evelyn Baring, 4th Earl of Cromer (b. 1946), of the Barings banking family
- Graeme George Shepherd, 3rd Baron Shepherd (b. 1949)
- Keiichi Hayashi (b. 1951), Representative of the Emperor of Japan
- Edward Stanley, 19th Earl of Derby (b. 1962)
- Peter Mackay, 4th Earl of Inchcape (b. 1943)
- Ravi Kumar, Pillai of Kandamath. Indian aristocrat
- Christopher Beazley MEP (b. 1952)
- Swapan Dasgupta (b. 1955) Indian MP and journalist
- Richard Harrington, Baron Harrington of Watford, MP (b. 1957), Minister of State for Refugees
- James Innes (b. 1975), British author

== Members in fiction ==
- Early in William Makepeace Thackeray's novel Vanity Fair (1848), Thackeray says of Joseph Sedley that "...he dined at fashionable taverns (for the Oriental Club was not as yet invented)." By the time of Sedley's return from India in 1827, "His very first point, of course, was to become a member of the Oriental Club, where he spent his mornings in the company of his brother Indians, where he dined, or whence he brought home men to dine."
- In Thackeray's The Newcomes (1855), Colonel Thomas Newcome and Binnie are members of the Oriental Club. Writing of Thackeray, Francis Evans Baily says "...the Anglo-Indian types in his novels, including Colonel Newcome, were drawn from members of the Oriental Club in Hanover Square".

== Bibliography ==
- Baillie, Alexander F., The Oriental Club and Hanover Square (London, Longman, Green, 1901, 290 pp, illustrated)
- Wheeler, Stephen (ed.), Annals of the Oriental Club, 1824–1858 (London, The Arden Press, 1925, xvi + 201 pp)
- Forrest, Denys Mostyn, The Oriental: Life Story of a West End Club (London, Batsford, 1968, 240 pp)
- Riches, Hugh A History of the Oriental Club (London, Oriental Club, 1998)
- Thévoz, Seth Alexander (2022). Behind Closed Doors: The Secret Life of London Private Members' Clubs. London: Robinson/Little, Brown. ISBN 978-1-47214-646-5.
- Thévoz, Seth Alexander (2025). London Clubland: A Companion for the Curious. London: Robinson/Little, Brown. ISBN 978-1472149985.

== See also ==
- List of London's gentlemen's clubs
