= HMS Ramillies (07) =

1917 Revenge-class battleship of the Royal Navy

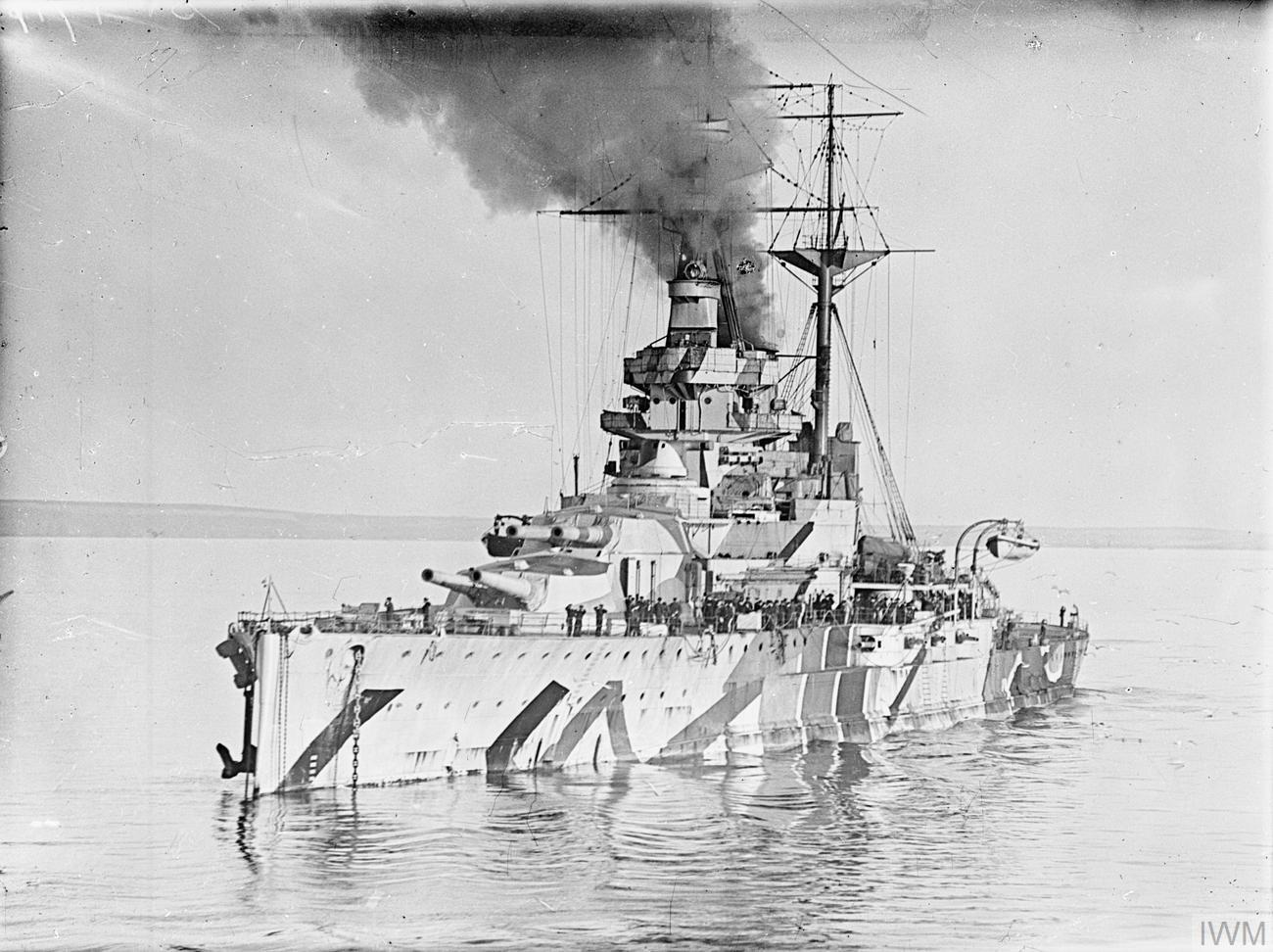
- Ramillies at anchor during the First World War, painted in dazzle camouflage

History

United Kingdom
- Name: Ramillies
- Namesake: Battle of Ramillies
- Builder: William Beardmore and Company, Dalmuir
- Laid down: 12 November 1913
- Launched: 12 September 1916
- Commissioned: 1 September 1917
- Identification: Pennant number: 07
- Nickname(s): Millie
- Fate: Sold for scrap, 2 February 1948

General characteristics (as built)
- Class & type: Revenge-class battleship
- Displacement: 27,790 long tons (28,236 t) (design); 31,130 long tons (31,630 t) (Deep load)
- Length: 620 ft 7 in (189.2 m)
- Beam: 101 ft 5.5 in (30.9 m)
- Draught: 33 ft 7 in (10.2 m) (Deep load)
- Installed power: 18 Babcock & Wilcox boilers; 40,000 shp (30,000 kW)
- Propulsion: 4 shafts; 4 steam turbines
- Speed: 21.5 knots (39.8 km/h; 24.7 mph)
- Range: 7,000 nmi (13,000 km; 8,100 mi) at 10 knots (18.5 km/h; 11.5 mph)
- Crew: 909
- Armament: 4 × twin 15 in (381 mm) guns; 14 × single 6 in (152 mm) guns; 2 × single 3 in (76 mm) AA guns; 4 × single 3-pdr (47 mm (1.9 in)) guns; 4 × 21 in (533 mm) torpedo tubes
- Armour: Waterline belt: 13 in (330 mm); Deck: 1–4 in (25–102 mm); Barbettes: 6–10 in (152–254 mm); Gun turrets: 11–13 in (279–330 mm); Conning tower: 3–11 in (76–279 mm); Bulkheads: 4–6 in (102–152 mm)

HMS Ramillies (pennant number: 07) was one of five Revenge-class battleships built for the Royal Navy during the First World War. They were developments of the Queen Elizabeth-class battleships, with reductions in size and speed to offset increases in the armour protection whilst retaining the same main battery of eight 15-inch (381 mm) guns. Completed in late 1917, Ramillies saw no combat during the war as both the British and the German fleets had adopted a more cautious strategy by this time owing to the increasing threat of naval mines and submarines.

Ramillies spent the 1920s and 1930s alternating between the Atlantic Fleet and the Mediterranean Fleet. Whilst serving in the Mediterranean and Black Seas in the early 1920s, the ship went to Turkey twice in response to crises arising from the Greco-Turkish War, including the Great Fire of Smyrna in 1922. She also saw limited involvement during the Allied intervention in the Russian Civil War. The ship's interwar career was otherwise uneventful. With the outbreak of the Second World War in September 1939, Ramillies was initially assigned to escort duties in the North Atlantic. In May 1940, she was transferred to the Mediterranean Fleet as war with Italy loomed. After the Italians entered the war in June, Ramillies bombarded Italian ports in North Africa, escorted convoys to Malta, and supported the Taranto raid in November.

The ship returned to Atlantic escort duties in 1941, during which time she prevented the two Scharnhorst-class battleships from attacking a convoy; she also joined the search for the battleship Bismarck. In late 1941, Ramillies was transferred to the Eastern Fleet as tensions with Japan rose; the following year, she was the flagship for the invasion of Madagascar. While moored there, she was torpedoed and badly damaged by Japanese midget submarines. The ship was updated for coastal bombardment duties in 1944, which she performed later that year during the Normandy landings in June and the invasion of southern France in August. In January 1945, the worn-out battleship was withdrawn from service and used as a barracks ship attached to the training establishment HMS Vernon. She was ultimately broken up in 1948.

== Design and description ==
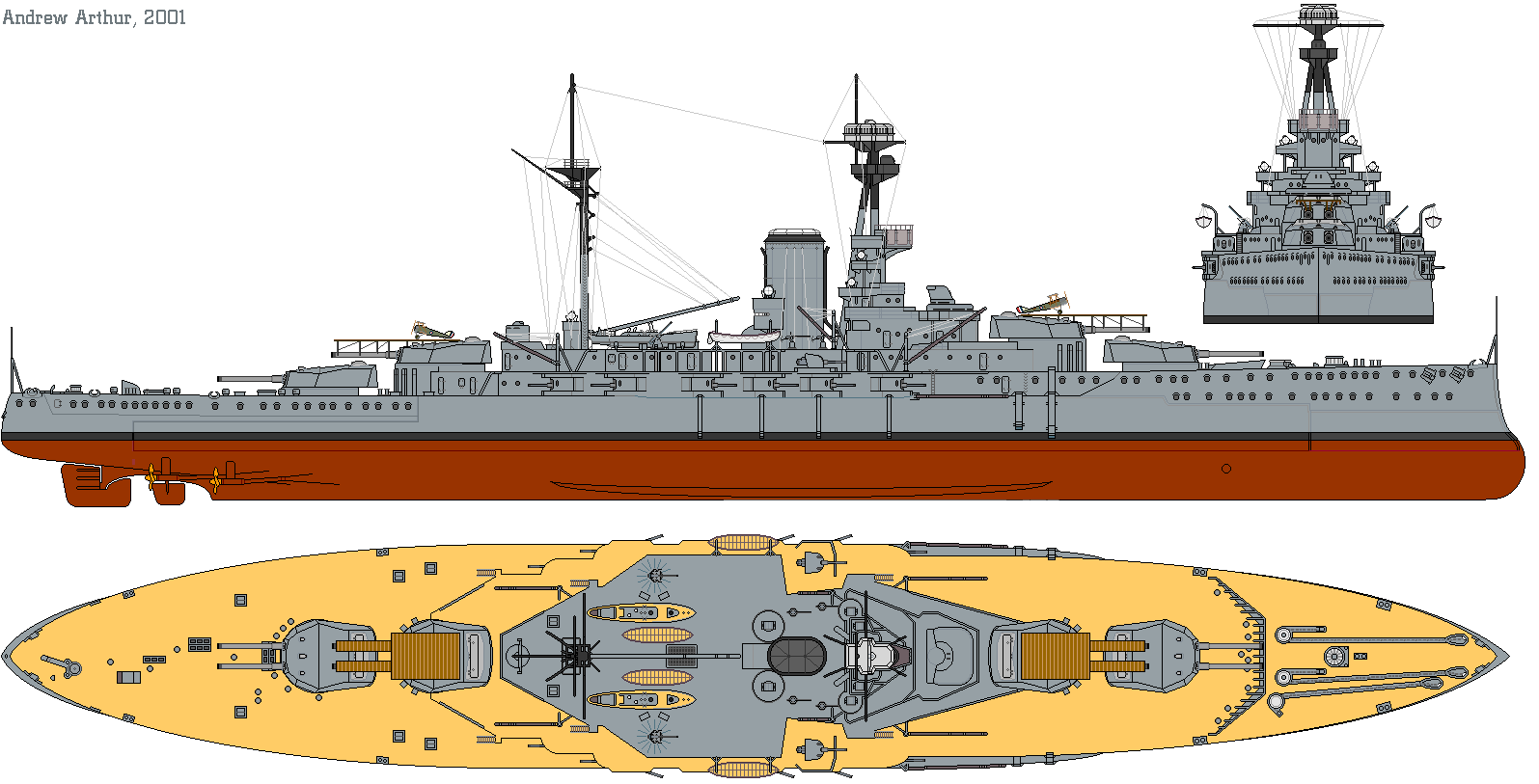
Illustration of sister ship HMS Revenge as she appeared in 1916

The Revenge-class battleships were designed as slightly smaller, slower, and more heavily protected versions of the preceding Queen Elizabeth-class battleships. As an economy measure they were intended to revert to the previous practice of using both fuel oil and coal, but First Sea Lord Jackie Fisher rescinded the decision to use coal in October 1914. Still under construction, the ships were redesigned to employ oil-fired boilers that increased the power of the engines by 9,000 shaft horsepower (6,700 kW) over the original specification.

Ramillies had a length overall of 620 feet 7 inches (189.2 m), a beam of 101 feet 5.5 inches (30.9 m) and a deep draught of 33 feet 7 inches (10.2 m). She had a designed displacement of 27,790 long tons (28,236 t) and displaced 31,130 long tons (31,630 t) at deep load. She was powered by two pairs of Parsons steam turbines, each driving two shafts, using steam provided by eighteen Babcock & Wilcox boilers. The combined turbines were rated at 40,000 shp (30,000 kW) and intended to give the ship a maximum speed of 23 knots (42.6 km/h; 26.5 mph). During her sea trials on 1 October 1917, the ship reached a top speed of only 21.5 knots (39.8 km/h; 24.7 mph) from 42,414 shp (31,628 kW). She had a range of 7,000 nautical miles (13,000 km; 8,100 mi) at a cruising speed of 10 knots (18.5 km/h; 11.5 mph). Her crew numbered 909 officers and ratings in 1916. Her metacentric height was 3.4 feet (1 m) at deep load.

The Revenge class was equipped with eight breech-loading (BL) 15-inch (381 mm) Mk I guns in four twin gun turrets, in two superfiring pairs fore and aft of the superstructure, designated 'A', 'B', 'X', and 'Y' from front to rear. Twelve of the fourteen BL 6-inch (152 mm) Mk XII guns were mounted singly in casemates along the broadside of the vessel amidships; the remaining pair were mounted on the shelter deck and were protected by gun shields. The ship also mounted four 3-pounder (47 mm (1.9 in)) saluting guns. Her anti-aircraft (AA) armament consisted of two quick-firing (QF) 3-inch (76 mm) 20 cwt Mk I (Note: "Cwt" is the abbreviation for hundredweight, 20 cwt referring to the weight of the gun.) guns. She was fitted with four submerged 21-inch (533 mm) torpedo tubes, two on each broadside.

Ramillies was completed with two fire-control directors fitted with 15-foot (4.6 m) rangefinders. One was mounted above the conning tower, protected by an armoured hood, and the other was in the spotting top above the tripod foremast. Each turret was also fitted with a 15-foot rangefinder. The main armament could be controlled by 'X' turret as well. The secondary armament was primarily controlled by directors mounted on each side of the compass platform on the foremast once they were fitted in April 1917. A torpedo-control director with a 15-foot rangefinder was mounted at the aft end of the superstructure.

The ship's waterline belt consisted of Krupp cemented armour (KC) that was 13 inches (330 mm) thick between 'A' and 'Y' barbettes and thinned to 4 to 6 inches (102 to 152 mm) towards the ship's ends, but did not reach either the bow or the stern. Above this was a strake of armour 6 inches thick that extended between 'A' and 'X' barbettes. Transverse bulkheads 4 to 6 inches thick ran at an angle from the ends of the thickest part of the waterline belt to 'A' and 'Y' barbettes. The gun turrets were protected by 11 to 13 inches (279 to 330 mm) of KC armour, except for the turret roofs which were 4.75–5 inches (121–127 mm) thick. The barbettes ranged in thickness from 6–10 inches (152–254 mm) above the upper deck, but were only 4 to 6 inches thick below it. The Revenge-class ships had multiple armoured decks that ranged from 1 to 4 inches (25 to 102 mm) in thickness. The main conning tower had 11 inches of armour on the sides with a 3-inch roof. The torpedo director in the rear superstructure had 6 inches of armour protecting it. After the Battle of Jutland, 1 inch of high-tensile steel was added to the main deck over the magazines and additional anti-flash equipment was added in the magazines.

The ship was fitted with flying-off platforms mounted on the roofs of 'B' and 'X' turrets in 1918, from which fighters and reconnaissance aircraft could launch. She was also equipped to handle a kite balloon around this same time. That same year, a Sopwith Pup fighter was flown off from the platform on B turret at least twice. During the early 1920s a Fairey Flycatcher fighter was deployed from that same platform. In 1927 a rotating aircraft catapult was installed on Ramillies's quarterdeck. It was removed during her 1929–1931 refit. The flying-off platforms were removed in 1932–1933. A catapult was added on the roof of 'X' turret by September 1936 as well as a crane to handle the aircraft.

=== Major alterations ===
The existing rangefinders in 'B' and 'X' turrets were replaced by 30-foot (9.1 m) models in 1919–1921 and her anti-aircraft defences were upgraded by the replacement of the original three-inch AA guns with a pair of QF four-inch (102 mm) AA guns during a short refit in 1924. Ramillies was refitted in 1926–1927, when her bulge was extended above her waterline and the "crushing tubes" (Note: The "crush tubes" were hollow cylinders that, by being crushed under the force of an underwater explosion, contained the effects of the blast, blocked mine or torpedo fragments from penetrating into the hull, and prevented the ship's interior spaces from flooding.) were removed from most of the lower bulge. An additional pair of four-inch AA guns were added, the six-inch guns from the shelter deck were removed and a simple high-angle rangefinder was added above the bridge.

During a more extensive refit in 1933–1934, a High-Angle Control System (HACS) Mk I director replaced the high-angle rangefinder on the spotting top and another replaced the torpedo director aft. A pair of octuple mounts for 2-pounder (40 mm (1.6 in)) Mk VIII "pom-pom"s were added on platforms abreast the funnel and directors for them were fitted on the foremast. A pair of quadruple mounts for Vickers 0.5 in (12.7 mm) AA machineguns were added abreast the conning tower and the mainmast was reconstructed as a tripod to support the weight of the second HACS. In addition the aft torpedo tubes were removed. By June 1938 the single mounts of the AA guns were replaced by twin mounts, the forward torpedo tubes were removed, a radio-direction finding office was added and the catapult was removed.

Wartime modifications for the Revenge-class ships were fairly minimal. A pair of four-barrel "pom-poms" were added in late 1941 atop 'B' and 'X' turrets as well as ten 20 mm Oerlikon cannon that replaced the quadruple .50-caliber mounts. By 1943 Ramillies was fitted with a Type 279 early-warning radar, a Type 273 surface-search radar, a Type 284B gunnery radar for the main guns, a pair of Type 285 anti-aircraft gunnery sets and two Type 282 radars for the "pom-poms". A Type 650 radio-guided missile jammer was added before June 1944. To save weight and make more room available for the additional crew required to man the new equipment like the radars and Oerlikons, four 6-inch guns were removed in 1943. In April of that year, 10 more Oerlikons were added and an additional three in 1944–1945.

== Service history ==
=== Construction and the First World War ===
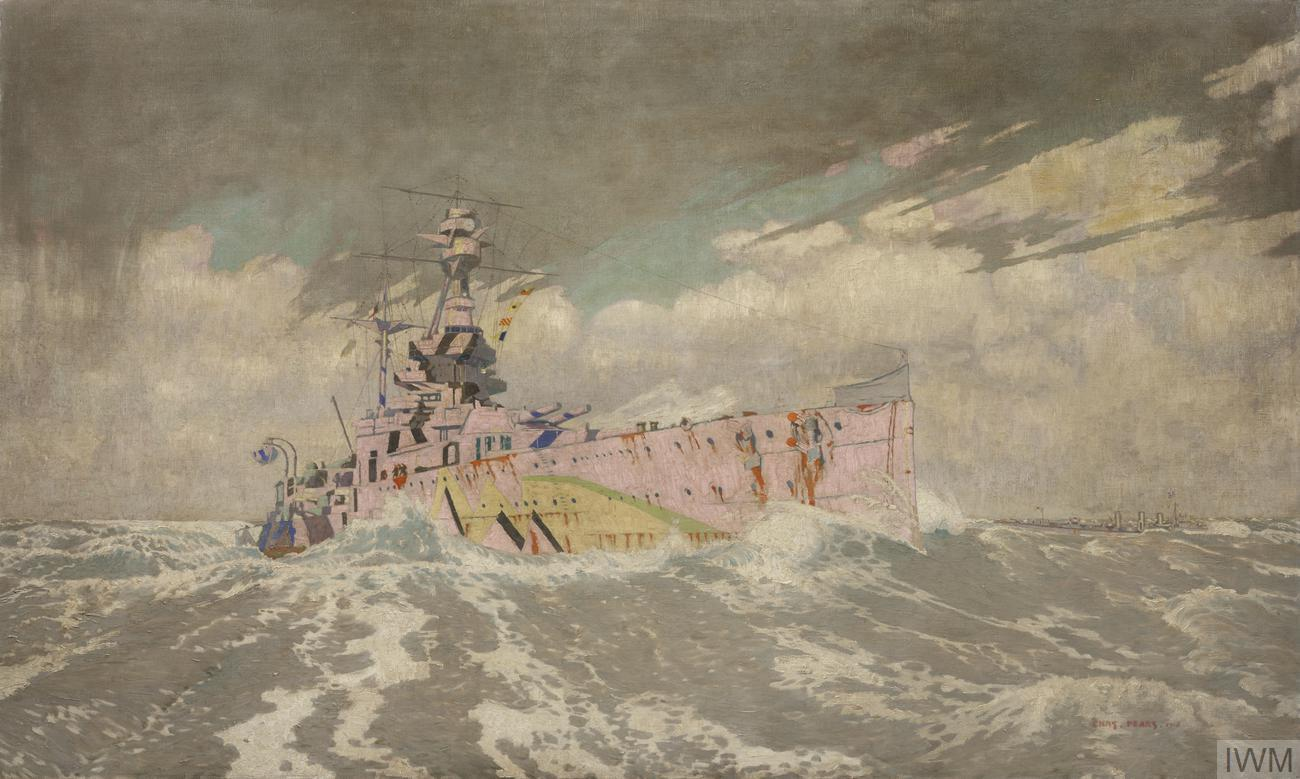
Painting of Ramillies depicting the vibrant colours and irregular shapes that characterised dazzle camouflage during the First World War

Ramillies, the fourth ship of her name to serve in the Royal Navy, was laid down at the William Beardmore and Company shipyard in Dalmuir on 12 November 1913. During construction, the decision was made to fit the vessel with anti-torpedo bulges, since her hull was the least complete of the members of her class. She was christened Ramillies after the 1706 Battle of Ramillies and was launched on 12 September 1916, but she struck the slipway, badly damaging the bottom of her hull and her rudders. Since the dry docks in Dalmuir were not long enough to accommodate Ramillies, she would have to be towed to the Gladstone Dock in Liverpool to be repaired by Cammell Laird. The ship was not seaworthy, however, so temporary repairs were effected in Dalmuir before she could be towed to Liverpool. Captain Henry Doughty was appointed in command on 11 April. The initial repairs were completed by May 1917, and she departed on 7 May; she ran aground on the way and had to be pulled free by eight tugboats on 23 May. These accidents significantly delayed completion of the ship compared to her sister ships, and she was the last member of the Revenge class to enter service with the Grand Fleet. Captain Percy Grant relieved Doughty in July and the ship was assigned to the 1st Battle Squadron in September 1917. Ramillies conducted extensive sea trials to determine what effect the bulges had on her speed and stability, and when it became clear that the bulges did not significantly reduce her speed and in fact improved stability, the Admiralty decided to install them on all four of her sisters.

After the action of 19 August 1916, in which the Grand Fleet had lost two light cruisers to German U-boat attacks, Admiral John Jellicoe, the fleet commander, decided the fleet should not be risked in such sorties unless the German High Seas Fleet ventured north or the strategic situation warranted the risk. For its part, the German fleet remained in port or trained in the Baltic Sea through 1917, as both sides had largely abandoned the idea of a decisive surface battle in the North Sea. Both sides turned to positional warfare, laying fields of naval mines, and Germany resumed the unrestricted submarine warfare campaign early in the year. As a result, Ramillies and the rest of the Grand Fleet saw no action during the last two years of the war.

In 1917, Britain began running regular convoys to Norway, escorted by light forces; the Germans raided these convoys twice late in the year, prompting Admiral David Beatty, who had replaced Jellicoe the previous year, to send battle squadrons of the Grand Fleet to escort the convoys. The High Seas Fleet went to sea on 23 April to attack one of the escorted convoys, but after the battlecruiser SMS Moltke suffered a serious mechanical accident the next day, the Germans were forced to break off the operation. Ramillies and the rest of the Grand Fleet sortied on 24 April once they intercepted wireless signals from the damaged Moltke, but the Germans were too far ahead of the British, and no shots were fired. On 21 November 1918, following the Armistice, the entire Grand Fleet left port to escort the surrendered German fleet into internment at Scapa Flow.

=== Interwar years ===
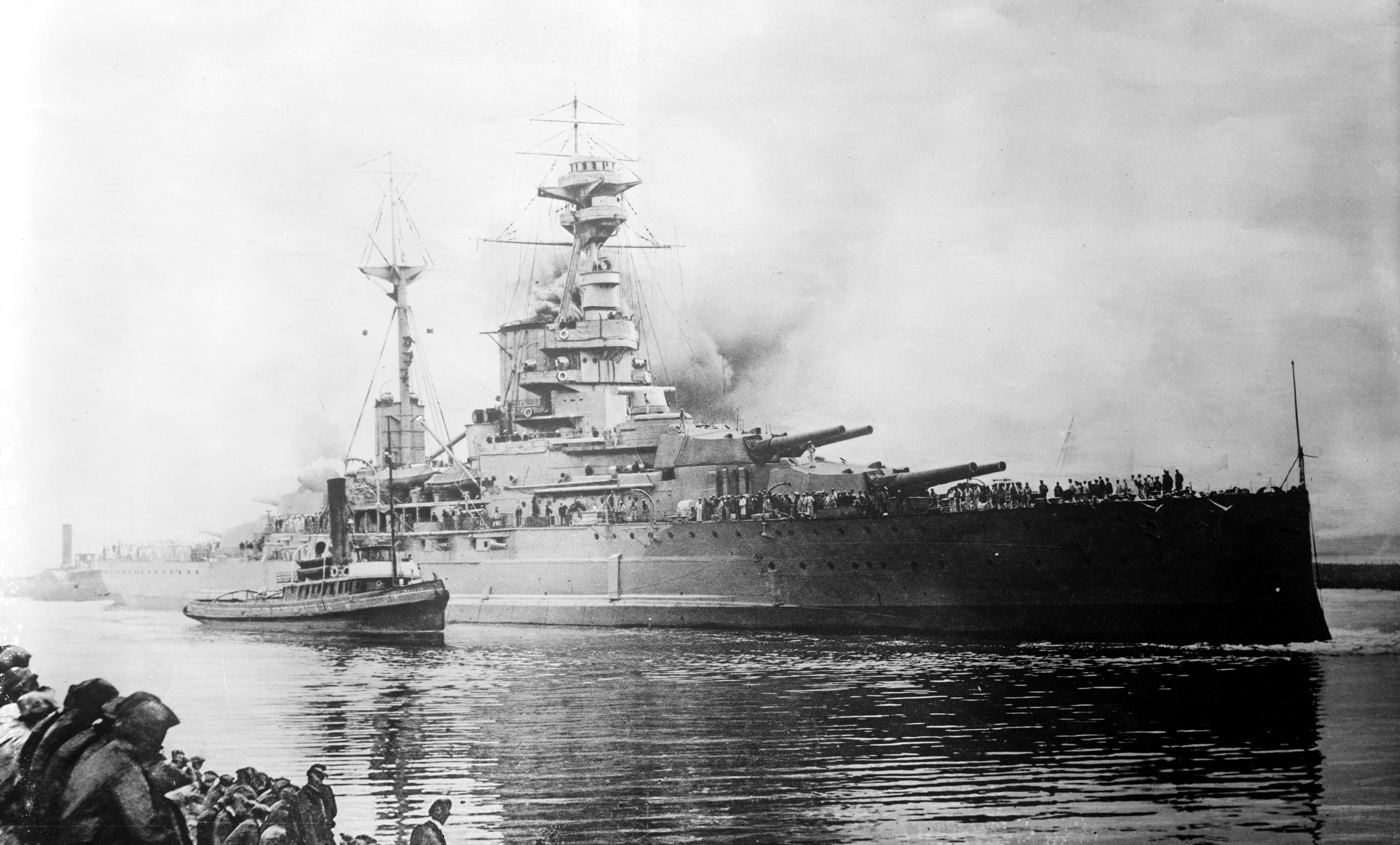
Ramillies, probably in the late 1910s or 1920s

Throughout the 1920s and 1930s, Ramillies typically operated with her sister ships, apart from periods where they were detached for refit or modernisation. Grant was relieved by Captain John Luce on 1 February 1919. In April the ships were transferred to the Atlantic Fleet, still as part of the 1st Battle Squadron. They were then attached to the Mediterranean Fleet in early 1920 for operations in Turkey and the Black Sea as part of Britain's responses to the Greco-Turkish War and the Russian Civil War, respectively.

On 16 March Ramillies and her sisters Revenge, Royal Oak, and Royal Sovereign landed parties of Royal Marines and sailors to assist the British Army in occupying Constantinople. Early the following month, Ramillies and Revenge were sent to Georgia to monitor the situation as Bolshevik troops approached that country. Luce was relieved in his turn by Captain Aubrey Smith on 9 April. In mid-June Ramillies and Revenge bombarded Turkish Nationalist forces advancing on Ismid, with the former expending 46 fifteen-inch shells and 657 shells from her six-inch guns. The sisters also off-loaded Royal Marine landing parties to reinforce the 242nd Infantry Brigade defending the city. They were supported by seaplanes from Pegasus and Ark Royal. Sailors from Ramillies boarded the battlecruiser Yavuz Sultan Selim and prepared her to be towed away from Ismid. Ramillies, Revenge and Royal Sovereign covered the landings in Eastern Thrace at the beginning of the Greek Summer Offensive.

The ships returned to the Atlantic Fleet in August. The 1st and 2nd Battle Squadrons merged in May 1921, with the Ramillies and her four sisters forming the 1st Division and the five Queen Elizabeth-class battleships forming the 2nd Division. Captain Francis Mitchell assumed command of the ship on 19 August. Ramillies and three of her sisters were again sent to the Mediterranean Fleet in September 1922 during the crisis in Smyrna that culminated in the Great Fire of Smyrna as the Greco-Turkish War came to its conclusion. The ships primarily operated in the Dardanelles and the Sea of Marmora. With the war over by November, the ships were free to return once again to the Atlantic Fleet.

Captain Wilfrid Nunn relieved Mitchell on 20 April 1924 before Ramillies underwent a refit at Rosyth in June. On 1 November, the Atlantic Fleet underwent a reorganisation that saw the Queen Elizabeth-class ships sent to the Mediterranean Fleet and the ships of the 1st Division reconstituted as the 1st Battle Squadron. She decommissioned for an extensive refit at Devonport in September 1926 which concluded on 1 March 1927, when she recommissioned for service. Ramillies and her sisters were transferred to the Mediterranean Fleet in August. Captain Hubert Monroe was appointed in command of the ship on 3 February 1928. In August and September, Ramillies participated in torpedo and anti-submarine exercises. She took part in manoeuvres simulating a surprise attack in January 1929 and then in combined exercises with the Atlantic Fleet two months later. Captain Bernard Fairbairn replaced Monroe in late April. She went to Jaffa in Mandatory Palestine in October during a period of unrest in the city. Ramillies briefly ran aground in Malta's Grand Harbour in January 1930. She steamed to Alexandria in September 1930 in response to rioting there. The ship paid off in June 1932 for another extensive refit at Devonport that lasted until August 1934. In early 1935, the Revenge and Queen Elizabeth classes again swapped places, though by this time, the Atlantic Fleet had been renamed the Home Fleet. On 16 July, the ships were present during the fleet review at Spithead for King George V's silver jubilee. Ramillies accidentally collided with the German steamship Eisenach in a gale in the Strait of Dover on 31 August; her bow was slightly damaged in the incident.

Beginning in 1936, she served as a training ship for Royal Naval Reserve and ship's boys, a role she filled until December 1937. During this period, she and her sisters were present for the Coronation Review for George VI on 20 May 1937. Captain Edward Syfret was appointed in command on 10 January 1938. Starting in July, the ship had another refit at Devonport that lasted until February 1939. Captain Harold Baillie-Grohman assumed command on 28 September 1938. Admiral Sir Martin Dunbar-Nasmith inspected the ship's company on 16 February. After recommissioning on 22 February, she was transferred to the Mediterranean Fleet, though this stint was short-lived. The ship was transferred back to the Home Fleet in July for use as a training ship. On 9 August, she was present during a fleet review for the King at Portland. Following its conclusion, she was sent to Alexandria, Egypt by way of Gibraltar, remaining there until October, by which time the Second World War had broken out in Europe.

=== Second World War ===
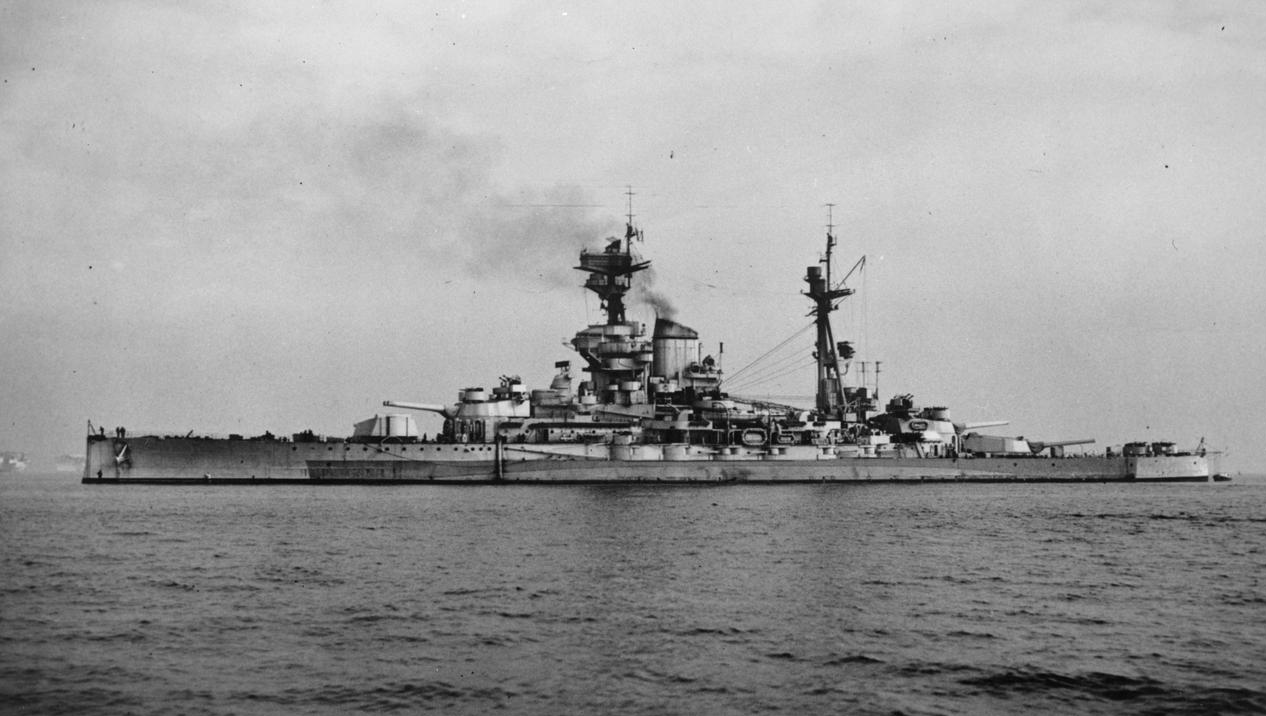
Ramillies at Greenock in 1944. Note the radar jammers installed aft of the mainmast as a countermeasure to German Henschel HS293 radio guided missiles

==== In the Atlantic and Mediterranean ====
On 5 October 1939 Ramillies was ordered to leave Alexandria to join the North Atlantic Escort Force based out of Halifax, Nova Scotia. The following day, the order was rescinded, and she was instead recalled to Alexandria to replace the battleship Malaya in the Mediterranean Fleet. In November, she was transferred to Aden as part of the search effort for the German commerce-raiding heavy cruiser Admiral Graf Spee. Ramillies made port visits in Australia en route to New Zealand, arriving in Wellington on 31 December, to rendezvous with the convoy transporting elements of the 2nd New Zealand Expeditionary Force to Egypt. She was the first battleship to visit the country and Baillie-Grohman was presented with a Māori piupiu (a warrior's skirt made from rolled flax) by the head of the Ngāti Poneke. The gift followed a tradition established in 1913 by the battlecruiser New Zealand, as the piupiu was intended to ward harm from the ship's company provided that it was worn while the ship was in danger.

Ramillies escorted the convoy to Australia where it was reinforced by ships carrying units of the Second Australian Imperial Force and then to Aden where the battleship left them to return to Australia to pick up another troop convoy for the Middle East. Admiral Graf Spee never entered the Indian Ocean, so Ramillies was transferred back to the Mediterranean Fleet in May 1940 as the probability of Italy joining the war on the German side began to rise. Following the Italian declaration of war on 10 June, the British fleet began operations against Italian positions throughout the Mediterranean. By late June, Ramillies was occupied with escorting convoys in the Mediterranean in company with Royal Sovereign and the aircraft carrier Eagle. In early July, after France had surrendered to Germany and while Britain sought to neutralise the French battleships in the Mediterranean lest they be seized by Germany and Italy, Baillie-Grohman negotiated with the commander of the battleship Lorraine in Alexandria to demilitarise his ship by unloading fuel and removing the breechblocks from his guns.

On 15 August, Ramillies bombarded the Italian port of Bardia and Fort Capuzzo outside Sollum with the battleships Malaya and Warspite and the heavy cruiser Kent. Italian bombers attacked the British fleet but they failed to score any hits; heavy anti-aircraft fire and fighters from Eagle shot down twelve Italian aircraft. The ships escorted a convoy to Malta from 8 to 14 October; poor weather hampered Italian reconnaissance efforts and the convoy reached Malta without incident. Captain Arthur Read relieved Baillie-Grohman on 27 October. The ship was part of the force that covered a series of convoys to and from Malta and Greece in early November during which Ramillies was attacked by the Italian submarine Pier Capponi as she approached Grand Harbour with no result. The battleship then escorted the aircraft carrier Illustrious when she struck the main Italian naval base at Taranto on the night of 11 November, inflicting serious damage on the Italian battle fleet. As a result of the raid on Taranto and the crippling of much of the Italian battleship fleet, Ramillies was no longer necessary to counter the strength of the Regia Marina (Royal Italian Navy), and so she was reallocated to the North Atlantic Escort Force. Later, on 27 November, she was attached to Force H to escort a Malta convoy during the Battle of Cape Spartivento, though she did not see action. In December, she returned to Devonport for a refit, escorting a convoy from Gibraltar to Greenock, Scotland, that lasted from 17 December to 6 January 1941.

On 12 January, Ramillies got underway to join the escort for a convoy out of Halifax bound for the Middle East. She continued convoy operations in the North Atlantic through August, and during this period, she escorted Convoy HX 106 which encountered the German fast battleships Scharnhorst and Gneisenau on 8 February. The lightly armed German battleships, equipped with 11-inch (280 mm) guns, and under orders to avoid conflict with enemy capital ships, did not attack the convoy when they realised Ramillies was among the escort vessels. On 23 May, Ramillies was detached from escort duties for Convoy HX 127 to join the search for the German battleship Bismarck, though she did not encounter the vessel. Prime Minister Winston Churchill visited the ship on 16 August in Hvalfjörður, Iceland, whilst returning from a conference in Placentia Bay, Newfoundland, with US President Franklin D. Roosevelt where they had signed the Atlantic Charter. Upon her return to the UK, Ramillies began a lengthy refit in Liverpool that lasted until 20 November.

==== With the Eastern Fleet ====
In October 1941 the Admiralty decided the ship was to be transferred to the 3rd Battle Squadron which was to be based in Colombo, Ceylon; she was joined there by her three surviving sisters. (Note: HMS Royal Oak had been sunk in Scapa Flow by the German submarine U-47 in October 1939.) The squadron was established in December and was attached to Force F. With the start of the Pacific War on 7 December, naval forces were necessary in the Indian Ocean to protect British India. By the end of March 1942, the Eastern Fleet had been formed, under the command of Admiral James Somerville. Despite the numerical strength of the Eastern Fleet, many of its units, including the four Revenge-class battleships, were no longer front-line warships. Vice-Admiral Chūichi Nagumo's powerful Kido Butai, composed of six carriers and four fast battleships, was significantly stronger than Somerville's Eastern Fleet. As a result, only the modernised Warspite could operate with the two fleet carriers; Ramillies, her three sisters, and Hermes were kept away from combat to escort convoys in the Indian Ocean.

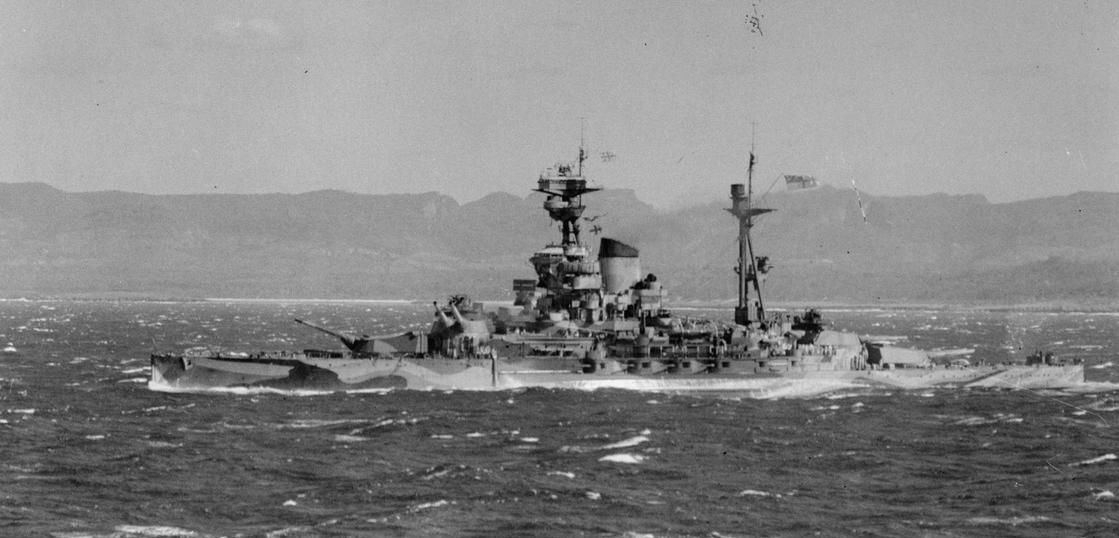
Ramillies approaching the entrance to Diego-Suarez harbour, May 1942

In late March, the code-breakers at the Far East Combined Bureau, a branch of Bletchley Park, informed Somerville that the Japanese were planning a raid into the Indian Ocean to attack Colombo and Trincomalee and destroy his fleet. He therefore divided his fleet into two groups: Force A, which consisted of the two fleet carriers, Warspite and four cruisers, and Force B, centred on Ramillies and her sisters and the carrier Hermes. He intended to ambush Nagumo's fleet in a night action, the only method by which he thought he could achieve a victory. After three days of searching for the Japanese fleet without success, Somerville returned to Addu Atoll, in the Maldives, to refuel. While there, Somerville received a report that the Japanese fleet was approaching Colombo which they attacked the following day, on 5 April, followed by attacks on Trincomalee on 9 April. Following the first raid on 5 April, Somerville withdrew Ramillies and her three sisters to Mombasa, Kenya, where they could secure the shipping routes in the Middle East and the Persian Gulf. The four Revenges departed from Addu Atoll early on the morning on 9 April, bound for Mombasa; they remained based there into 1943.

Syfret returned to Ramillies in late April as a rear admiral, commander of the covering force for the invasion of Madagascar (Operation Ironclad). The ship provided a landing party of 50 Royal Marines that were ferried by the destroyer Anthony at high speed past the coast defences of Diego Suarez on the northern end of Madagascar in the dark on 6 May. Disembarking in the harbour, they captured the French artillery command post along with its barracks and the naval depot. The following day the battleship engaged the coastal batteries on Oronjia Peninsula, but after enduring a few salvos of 15-inch shells, the French gunners decided to cease firing. Ramillies remained there during the Battle of Madagascar until the French garrison surrendered in November. On 30 May, Japanese midget submarines that had been launched by the submarines I-16 and I-20 attacked the ships in Diego Suarez. One of the midget submarines scored a hit on Ramillies just forward of her "A" turret on the port side. The explosion tore a large hole in the hull and caused extensive flooding, though damage control teams quickly contained it and prompt counter-flooding prevented her from listing badly. Still down by the bow after offloading most of her ammunition, she was nevertheless able to steam to Durban, South Africa, at a speed of 9 to 10 knots (17 to 19 km/h; 10 to 12 mph). There, she was inspected by the Constructor H. S. Pengelly, who noted that "although the vessel is now 26 years old and felt by most to be of little value owing to reduced size and slow speeds, the Ramillies is in exceptionally good shape, and I should wonder whether or not the capital ships of today with their lighter scantlings would survive a blow as well as this old girl, some 26 years after they were built."

The ship underwent temporary repairs in Durban from June to August before getting underway for Devonport, where permanent repairs were effected. She returned to service in June 1943, and in July, arrived in Kilindini in East Africa, where she rejoined the Eastern Fleet; by that time, she was the only battleship remaining on the station. Captain Gervase Middleton assumed command on 23 August. She left on 28 December, bound for Britain, where she was refitted for her new role as a coastal bombardment vessel. After arriving in January 1944, she was assigned to the Home Fleet.

==== Operations Overlord and Dragoon ====
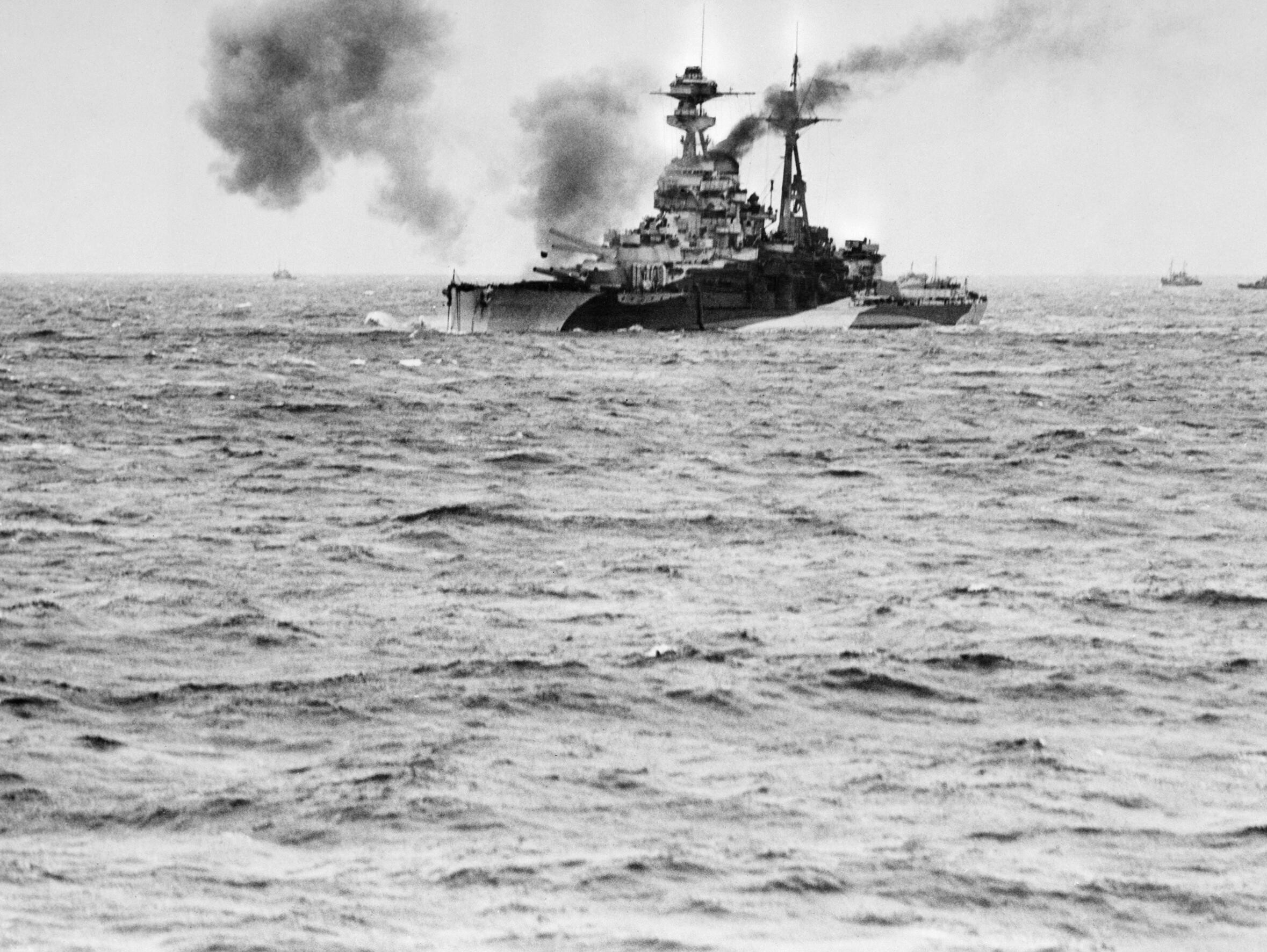
Ramillies bombarding German positions in Normandy, 6 June 1944

After her refit in early 1944 to augment her anti-aircraft defences was completed, Ramillies was assigned to Bombardment Force D, supporting the invasion fleet during the Normandy landings in June. In company with Warspite, the monitor Roberts, five cruisers and fifteen destroyers, the bombardment force operated to the east of Sword Beach, supporting Assault Force S. After assembling in the Clyde area, the force joined the main invasion fleet on the morning of 6 June off the French coast. The two battleships opened fire at around 05:30, Ramillies targeting the German battery at Benerville-sur-Mer. Shortly afterwards, three German torpedo boats sortied from Le Havre to attack the bombardment group. Although engaged by both Ramillies and Warspite as well as the cruisers, the German vessels were able to escape after launching fifteen torpedoes at long range. Two torpedoes passed between Warspite and Ramillies, and only one vessel, the Norwegian-manned destroyer Svenner, was struck and sunk.

The battleships resumed shelling the coastal batteries for the rest of the day, suppressing the heavy German guns, which allowed cruisers and destroyers to move closer in to provide direct fire support to the advancing troops. Ramillies carried out eleven shoots against Bennerville battery with considerable observed success, to the extent that the battery showed no sign of life in the afternoon. As a result, the planned commando landing to neutralise it (Operations Frog and Deer) were cancelled. The pair of battleships returned to their station the next day, this time in company with the battleship Rodney. Over the course of the next week, the battleships—with Rodney alternating with her sister Nelson—continually bombarded German defences facing the British and Canadian invasion beaches at Sword, Gold, and Juno. Over the course of her bombardment duties off the Normandy coast, Ramillies fired 1,002 shells from her main battery. Her worn-out guns had to be replaced afterwards at HM Dockyard, Portsmouth.

In July, Ramillies was transferred to the Mediterranean as forces were assembled for Operation Dragoon, the invasion of southern France that was to take place the following month. Ramillies was one of five battleships to support the landings, namely the American battleships USS Nevada, Arkansas and Texas, and the Free French Lorraine. Owing to her late arrival in the Mediterranean she did not join Gunfire Support Group Alpha in Malta, instead she sailed direct from Algiers to rendezvous with the group off the French coast early on 15 August.

Ramillies carried out bombardments between 15 and 28 August. On D-Day, Gunfire Support Group Alpha primarily engaged coastal batteries guarding landing sector Alpha, around the Gulf of St. Tropez. Ramillies fired ten rounds at the heavy battery south of St. Tropez at 06:15 and twenty-four rounds at the battery near Cape Camarat at 06:54. Thereafter there was little need for further support as the invading infantry moved quickly inland. On 17 August, Ramillies moved to the Sitka sector and bombarded German positions on the island of Port-Cros. Guided by a spotter aircraft flying from Quincy (CA-71), she scored six direct hits on the town's fort.

The ground forces fought their way west towards Toulon. Supporting fire from the bombardment force assisted French forces who captured half of the city, but batteries on the St. Mandrier Peninsula continued to hold out. It was decided that a determined effort would be made to destroy or capture the forts on 25 August and the day before, Ramillies, who had been ordered to Algiers, received orders to return to the assault area. Arriving off Porquerolles at 14:00 on 25 August, she joined Lorraine and a number of cruisers. Confusion initially reigned and Ramillies did not open fire until 16:40, firing sixteen rounds before her targets were obscured by smoke. Recommencing fire at 18:38, she fired a further forty-six rounds, scoring several hits and silencing two batteries. Several batteries continued to hold out and on 26 August, the bombardment continued. Ramillies fired thirty-five rounds, scoring direct hits and observing no retaliatory fire. On 27 August she fired forty-eight more rounds, of which at least thirty-four fell within 50 yards of her target batteries. The German gun crews surrendered the following day. Ramillies was finally released from the assault area on 29 August.

==== Fate ====
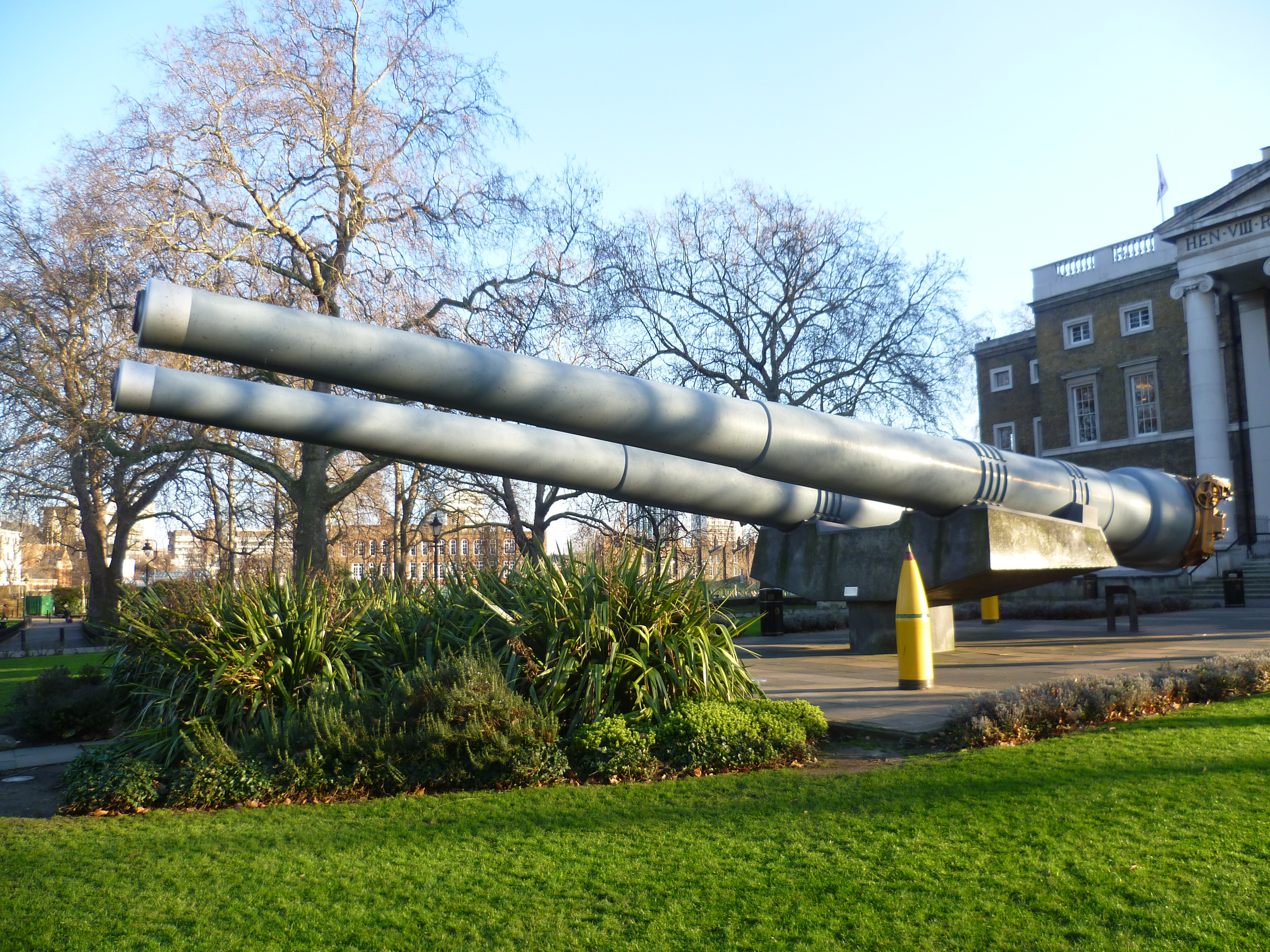
A gun of HMS Ramillies (the near one) on display in front of the Imperial War Museum

On 31 January 1945, her bombardment ability no longer required, Ramillies was reduced to reserve at Portsmouth. She was partially disarmed and converted into a barracks ship on 15 May, after the German surrender. The ship was attached to the training establishment HMS Vernon, where she was known as Vernon III. In December 1947, the worn-out battleship was placed on the disposal list and she was transferred to the British Iron & Steel Corporation on 2 February 1948 to be sold for scrap. She was taken to Cairnryan on 23 April and subsequently broken up.

One of Ramillies' 15-inch guns has been preserved and can be seen outside the Imperial War Museum in London. The gun was mounted aboard the ship in 1916 and remained in place until 1941, when it was removed and placed in storage. The gun was used in the actions around Bardia and at Cape Spartivento. It was installed in its current location in 1968, along with a gun from Roberts.

The Beardmore Sculpture was created by Tom McKendrick to commemorate the employees of the long-closed Beardmore Shipyard in Dalmuir. Unveiled on 9 September 2010, the artist chose to crown the sculpture with a 19-foot-8-inch (6 m) model of Ramillies.
