= Francis Stewart Montague-Bates =

British general

Brigadier-General Francis Stewart Montague-Bates CB CMG DSO
- Born: 8 February 1876
- Died: 21 June 1954 (aged 78)
- Military career
- Allegiance: United Kingdom
- Branch: British Army
- Service years: 1900–1932; 1940–1944
- Rank: Brigadier-General
- Nickname: "Monty"
- Unit: East Surrey Regiment
- Commands: 1st Battalion, East Surrey Regiment; 12th (Service) Battalion, Cheshire Regiment; 77th Infantry Brigade; 83rd Infantry Brigade; 66th Infantry Brigade; 242nd Infantry Brigade; 141st (5th London) Infantry Brigade
- Conflicts: Second Boer War; First World War; Occupation of Turkey; Anglo-Irish War; Second World War
- Awards: Companion of the Order of the Bath (1919); Companion of the Order of St Michael and St George (1918); Distinguished Service Order (1917); Mentioned in dispatches six times (1915–19); Legion of Honour, 4th Class (France); Croix de Guerre avec Palme (France); Commander of the Order of the Redeemer, 3rd Class (Greece)

Brigadier-General Francis Stewart Montague-Bates, CB, CMG, DSO, (8 February 1876 – 21 June 1954) was a British Army officer in the early part of the 20th century, seeing active service in the Second Boer War, the First World War, the occupation of Constantinople, the Anglo-Irish War, and the Second World War.

== Family life ==
Francis Stewart Montague-Bates was born on 8 February 1876, the only son of Henry Montague Bates and Mary Montague-Bates, her second husband, whom she married in 1872, following the death of her first husband from Cholera, Colonel Andrew Gammell of the 12th Lancers, in 1869. The family lived in London and also had property in Manaccan, Cornwall. Captain Montague Bates was married in Canada in 1910 to Gladys Thomas of Plymouth. They had one son, Patrick Montague Bates born in 1914, who, after education at Wellington College on a scholarship, joined Imperial Airways. He was a member of the RAFVR, called up in late 1939, trained as a pilot officer in 1940 and was shot down by a Messerschmidt 109 and killed in action in early 1941 piloting a Blenheim IV, whilst returning from a mission bombing a viaduct during the invasion of Crete by German Forces

Francis Stewart Montague Bates was educated at Appuldurcombe College on the Isle of Wight.

== Military career ==
=== Second Boer War ===
When the Second Boer War broke out in October 1899, Montague-Bates was in Rangoon, Burma. He volunteered for service in South Africa, and was accepted on 12 February 1900 and served for a few months (135 days) as a corporal in B Section in Lumsden's Horse, a mounted infantry unit raised by Colonel Lumsden and supported by Sir Giles Playfair. The Unit was mainly composed of volunteers from regiments of the Indian Volunteer Force. On 4 August 1900 he was commissioned as a second lieutenant in the 2nd Battalion East Surrey Regiment, which was serving elsewhere in the South African theatre, and for a while he commanded a section of a composite mounted infantry company formed from 2nd East Surreys and 1st Battalion Durham Light Infantry. He was promoted to lieutenant on 21 May 1902, shortly before the end of the war.

After the Boer War, Montague-Bates was in July 1902 seconded for four years to the South African Constabulary organised by Major-General Robert Baden-Powell, the founder of the Scout Movement. (In 1913 Montague-Bates published a book on infantry scouting.) He was promoted to captain in 1909 and again seconded, from 1910 to 1912, to the Canadian Forces.

=== Western Front ===
When World War I broke out in August 1914, Montague-Bates was serving as adjutant of the 6th Battalion East Surreys, a Territorial Force unit based at Kingston upon Thames.

In November he was sent to the Western Front with a draft of reinforcements to join the 2nd Battalion, Queen's (Royal West Surrey) Regiment, which had suffered badly in the First Battle of Ypres. As the senior officer present he took command of the battalion, becoming a temporary major in December. Holding the line in the Ypres Salient, 2nd Queens' were actively engaged in trench raids during this period. A major attack was ordered for the afternoon of 18 December, when the 7th Division attacked Well Farm near La Boutillerie. The attack was led by the 2nd Battalion, Royal Warwickshire Regiment, with two companies of the 2nd Queen's in support. The preliminary bombardment had done little damage to the German defences, and the Warwicks were halted in the wire just short of the enemy trench. Going forward, the Queen's could do no more than reach the wire and reinforce the Warwicks in the dusk. Realising that the attack had failed, Montague-Bates decided not to renew it, but issued orders for the survivors to get back as best they could. Casualties were heavy in the barely reformed battalions, but senior commanders testified to the gallantry and devotion they had shown in attempting an impossible task.

When a more senior officer of the Queen's arrived at the end of the year, Montague-Bates reverted to his previous rank of captain and became adjutant of the battalion until after the Battle of Neuve Chapelle in March 1915, when he was posted to fill the same appointment with the Warwicks. In the summer of 1915 he returned to the 1st Battalion of his own regiment, which was serving in the 5th Division, succeeding to command of the battalion (with promotion to major and temporary lieutenant colonel) in August, when the battalion's commanding officer (CO) was invalided home.

=== Salonika ===
At the end of 1915, Montague-Bates was sent to the Egyptian Expeditionary Force (EEF) and then to the Macedonian front, where in January 1916 he took command of the 12th (Service) Battalion, Cheshire Regiment, a 'Kitchener Army' battalion serving in the 66th Brigade of the 22nd Division. At first the British Salonika Army was restricted to digging into its bridgehead around the port (nicknamed 'The Birdcage'), but in April, the brigade led the way inland towards the Bulgarian frontier.

On 27 August 1916 Montague-Bates was promoted to temporary brigadier general to take temporary command of the 77th Brigade in the neighbouring 26th Division, then moved on 25 September to the 83rd Brigade in the 28th Division. Finally, on 15 November 1916, he returned to the 22nd Division to assume command of the 66th Brigade, which position he held until the demobilisation of the division in Turkey in March 1919. He was in charge of the brigade during the heavy fighting of the Battles of Doiran of 1917 and 1918. In September 1919 he once more took over the 83rd Brigade, 28th Division, which was then forming part of the British Army of Occupation in Turkey.

=== Turkey ===
Following the occupation of Constantinople, the 83rd Brigade was garrisoning the Dardanelles forts, but in November 1919 it was moved to the Izmit area to guard the Anatolian Railway. In March 1920 it moved back to Constantinople, but a new independent brigade (242nd Brigade) was formed at Izmit under Montague-Bates. This consisted of British and Indian infantry battalions, with supporting troops.

During August Montague-Bates authorised a sortie over the River Sarkaria to protect his perimeter against attacks by Nationalist Turks. He was reprimanded by Major-General Edmund Ironside who had just taken over command of the Izmit area. One of Montague-Bates' staff reported that the two generals 'had heated words' and 'When Brigadier Bates came out of the meeting he was white with rage, said good-bye, and having collected his belongings left with hardly a word'. Montague-Bates returned to Constantinople and was sent home. The staff officer wrongly believed that Montague-Bates had resigned his commission, and wrote that 'Monty' was 'a great loss to the army, for though not liked by many, was a first-class soldier'.

=== Ireland ===
On return to the United Kingdom Montague-Bates had to relinquish his temporary rank of brigadier general and reverted to the Brevet lieutenant colonelcy he had been awarded in June 1916. He rejoined the 2nd Battalion, East Surreys and in June 1921 he became Officer Commanding Troops at Dublin Castle during the peak of the violence during the Anglo-Irish War.

=== Regimental service ===
In August 1922 Montague-Bates returned from Northern Ireland to the 1st Battalion, East Surreys, then stationed in Egypt. He commanded the battalion from December 1923 to December 1927, in Hong Kong and India.

During this period, Montague-Bates was promoted to brevet colonel, and in March 1928 after his term of regimental command expired, he was appointed brigade commander of 141st (5th London) Brigade of the Territorial Army (TA), based at the Duke of York's Headquarters in Chelsea. He retired from the army in 1932, but served again in Cornwall, commanding the Home Guard unit for the Helford Estuary with its headquarters in Gweek. Home Guard during the World War II invasion scare of 1940–41.

Frank Montague-Bates died at the age of 78 on 21 June 1954 at his home at Manaccan. His funeral was held on 30 June at Kensal Green Cemetery.

== Awards ==
During his career Montague-Bates received the following awards and honours:

- CB (1919)
- CMG (1918)
- DSO (1917)
- Mentioned in dispatches six times (1915–19)
- Legion of Honour, 4th Class (France)
- Croix de Guerre avec Palme (France)
- Commander of the Order of the Redeemer, 3rd Class (Greece)

== Publications ==
- The Infantry Scout: An outline of his training, pub'd Hugh Rees, Ltd, London, 1913, reprinted (twice) in 1915.
