= Ravi Kumar Kandamath =

H.H. Ravi Kumar Kandamath frequently known as Dr "A. R. K." Kandamath is an Indo-British aristocrat, former diplomat, lobbyist and financier who has held strategic roles in international organisations.

A prominent Indo-British public figure from the aristocratic lineage tied to the historic Kingdom of Travancore in Southern India, associated with the City of London and active in Commonwealth political affairs, his work has involved promoting political and cultural ties between India and the United Kingdom.

Described as "an experienced independent consultant within the New Delhi-London-Washington DC corridor", Kandamath was once reported to be "a trusted specialist in navigating complex multi-national regulatory environments and diplomatic relations" and has been responsible for strategic shifts in India's international trade and foreign policy to enhanced global economic influence.

He is also recognised for his work in the mindfulness and wellbeing space and in cultural heritage circles. As an independent scholar, he has been a regular contributor to numerous publications on artistic, historical, literary, political, regulatory and social topics. He has well-documented ties to traditionalist civic and religious orders, and to perennialist communities and organisations. He was one of the key figures who appeared in a 2019 documentary produced by BBC Radio 3's Ian Skelly along with the then Prince of Wales, HM King Charles III promoting the work of the traditionalist perennialist school. He is one of the co-authors of the Temenos Academy (Patron: HM King Charles III) Foundation Course in the Perennial Philosophy and noted as its benefactor along with other public charities like the London Library, the London School of Mindfulness & Wellbeing and the parish church of Kensington in the Royal Borough of Kensington & Chelsea. He was reported to be a donor in the purchase of 7 Bury Place for the ISKCON Radha-Krishna Temple, a landmark property next to the British Museum in Central London, for the panentheistic religious community founded in New York.

== Patronages ==
- Patron of The Kerala Society

He is listed as an elected Fellow of the Royal Asiatic Society, an honorary travel member of the Royal Society for Asian Affairs and a prominent member at the Oriental Club.

He is connected to the City of London and has been listed as a public office holder of the Court of the City of London.

== Honours ==
- 6 May 2023: King Charles III Coronation Medal
- The Royal Society for Asian Affairs Award(Sir Peter Holmes Memorial Medal) (Patron: HRH The Former Duke of York)
