= Stratford Place =

No through road in London, England

Coordinates: 51.5149°N 0.1493°W

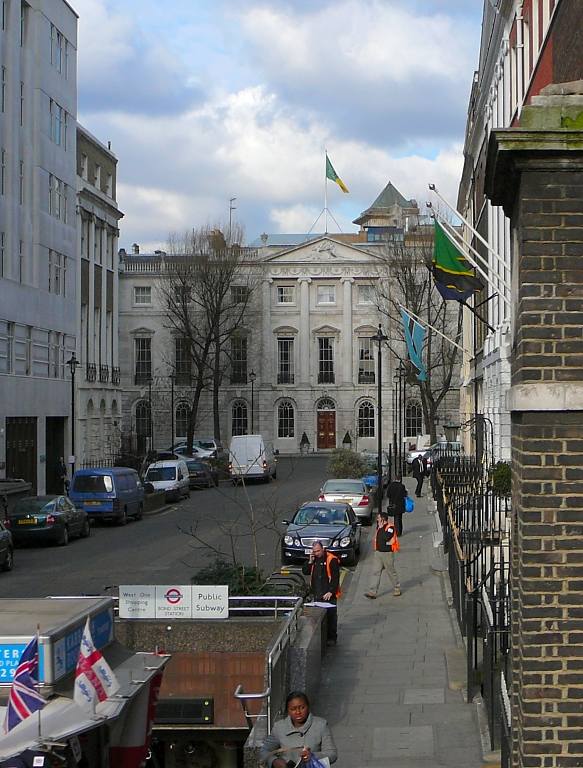
Stratford Place seen from Oxford Street

Stratford Place is a small road in London, off Oxford Street, opposite Bond Street underground station. The road is a cul-de-sac.

== Stratford House ==
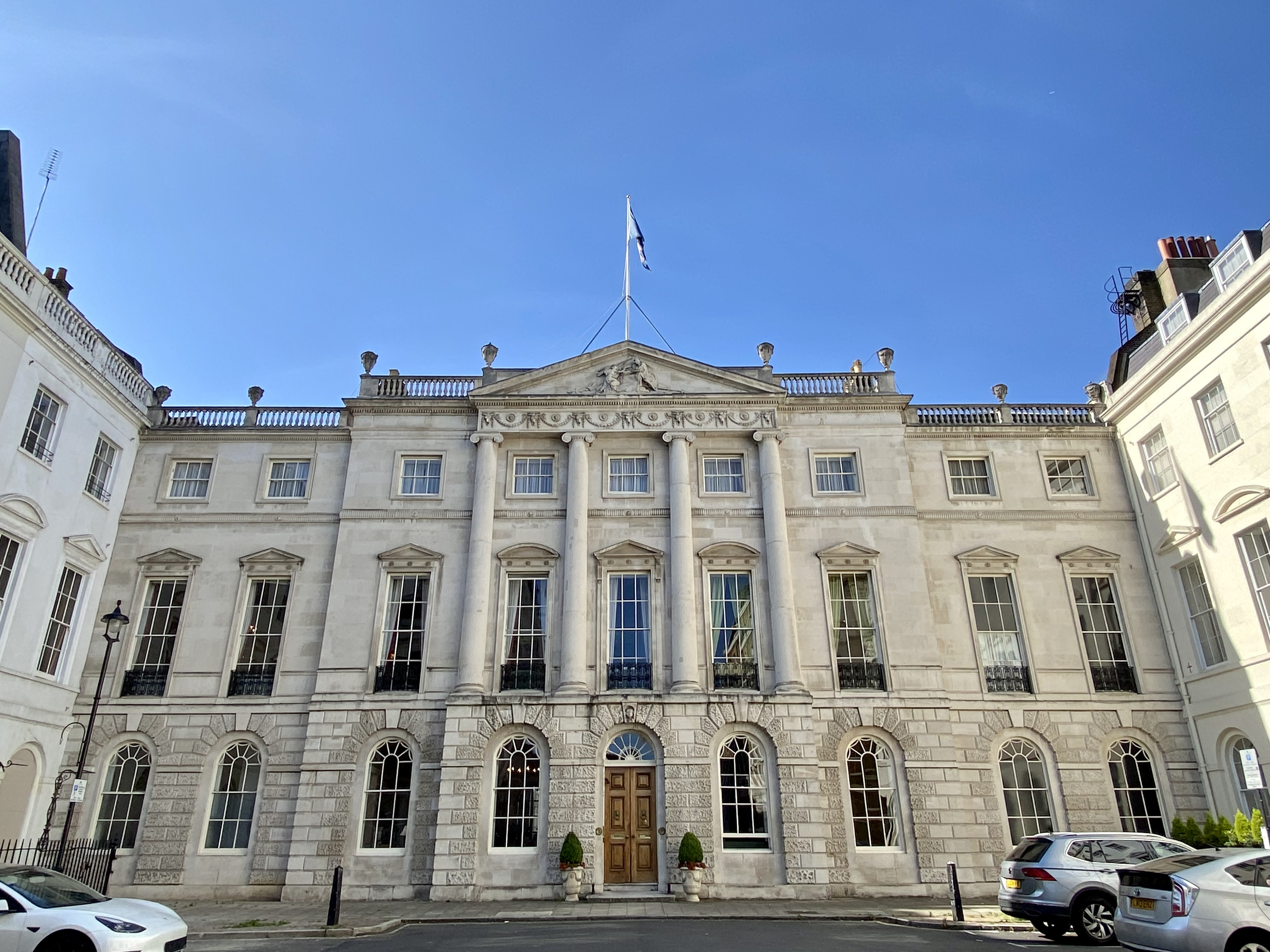
Stratford House

Stratford House was built as the London town house of the Stratford family between 1770 and 1776 for Edward Stratford, 2nd Earl of Aldborough, who paid £4,000 for the site. The central range was designed by Robert Adam. It had previously been the location of the Lord Mayor of London's Banqueting House, built in 1565. Several people of note stayed there, including the sons of the Tsar of Russia. Clementine Hozier was born there and until 1832 the house was owned by the Wingfield Stratford branch of the family who inherited it through Edward's will. It belonged briefly to Grand Duke Nicholas Nikolaevich, a son of Tsar Nicholas I of Russia. The house was little altered until 1894, when its then owner, Murray Guthrie, added a second storey to the east and west wings and a colonnade in front. In 1903, a new owner, the Liberal politician Sir Edward Colebrook, later Lord Colebrooke, reconstructed the Library to an Adam design. In 1908, Edward Stanley, 17th Earl of Derby bought a lease and began more alterations, removing the colonnade and adding a third storey to both wings. He took out the original bifurcated staircase (replacing it with a less elegant single one), demolished the stables and built a Banqueting Hall with a grand ballroom above.

In 1960 the house was purchased by the Oriental Club and converted to its present state. The ballroom was turned into two floors of new bedrooms, more lifts were added, and the banqueting hall was divided into a dining room and other rooms. The house now has a main drawing room, a members' bar, a library and an ante-room, a billiards room, an internet suite and business room, and two (non)smoking rooms, as well as a dining room and 32 bedrooms.

Stratford House is a Grade I listed building.

== Notable buildings and occupants ==
- Stratford House (home to the Oriental Club)
- Number 4 Stratford Place was the headquarters of the Apollinaris Company Ltd in the early 1900s.
- The High Commission of Botswana is at 6 Stratford Place. The building is Grade II listed.
- The High Commission of Tanzania
- Number 7 Stratford Place was the London home of Martin van Buren.
- A Kabbalah Centre
- Nos 12-13 are listed townhouses dating from 1774, designed by Richard Edwin.

== See also ==
- Aldborough House, Dublin

== Bibliography ==
- Stourton, James (2012). Great Houses of London (Hardback). London: Frances Lincoln. ISBN 978-0-7112-3366-9.
