= Assam Valley Light Horse =

The Assam Valley Light Horse regiment was raised in 1891 and formed part of Indian Volunteer Corps, later the Indian Defence Force and finally the Auxiliary Force (India).

The regimental headquarters was at Dibrugarh in Assam. It was recruited from the European community in Assam—mostly tea planters.

A light horse regiment had a rough strength of approximately 400 men and its troops typically fought as mounted infantry rather than traditional cavalry.

A few volunteers from the regiment joined Lumsden's Horse in 1899 raised by Colonel Dugald McTavish Lumsden for service in the Boer War and similarly in 1911 a few volunteers took part in the Abor campaign of 1911–12.

It was not mobilized as a unit during World War I or World War II but individuals did serve, mainly with the British Indian Army.

The regiment was disbanded when India became independent in August 1947.
