= Henry Marley Burton =

British architect

Captain Henry Marley Burton FRIBA (1821–1880) was a British architect, who was trained by his uncle Decimus Burton and trained Edward John May FRIBA.

== Family ==
He was the eldest, and illegitimate, son of the gunpowder-manufacturer William Ford Burton (1784–1856): who was the eldest son of the London property-developer James Burton Senior.

Henry Marley Burton had one brother who was William Warwick Burton (d. 1861), who resided at Lincoln's Inn Fields and was articled as a solicitor to his uncle Septimus Burton (1794 – 1842).

Henry Marley Burton was baptised as Henry Marley on 12 December 1821: when he was claimed to be the son of William Marley by Sally Marley, who were neighbours.

== Architect ==
Henry Marley Burton was trained in the office of his uncle Decimus Burton, whose practice he inherited when Decimus retired, in 1869, after they had trained the architect Edward John May FRIBA.

In 1866, Henry Marley was commissioned by John George Dodson, 1st Baron Monk Bretton to design a mansion at Coneyborough, after Decimus had designed Bineham in Chailey for Dodson's brother-in-law John George Blencowe. He supervised the construction of additions to the Oriental Club, which were designed by Decimus Burton in 1853, when it eventually commenced in 1871.

== Personal life and issue ==
Henry Marley's residence was 14 Spring Gardens, St James's. He was a Captain in the Queen's (Westminster) Rifle Corps. He died in 1880.

His son Edgar Burton also became an architect. Edgar Burton's daughter, Adelaide Veronica Elizabeth Burton, was abortively married, at St. George's, Hanover Square, to the German Jew Leopold Albu, of 4 Hamilton Place, Mayfair, who was the brother of the mining-magnate Sir George Albu, 1st Baronet, between 19 August 1901 and 1915.
