= William Tuyll =

General Sir William Tuyll KCH
- Born: 1777; Utrecht, Netherlands
- Died: 26 December 1864 (aged 86–87); Den Haag, Netherlands
- Relatives: Diederik Tuyll van Serooskerken (brother)
- Military career
- Allegiance: Dutch Republic; United Kingdom
- Branch: Dutch States Army; British Army
- Service years: 1790–1795 (Dutch); 1799–1864 (British)
- Rank: General
- Units: 7th Light Dragoons; 25th Light Dragoons
- Conflicts: French Revolutionary Wars; Flanders Campaign; Anglo-Russian Invasion of Holland; Napoleonic Wars; Peninsular War; Walcheren Campaign

General Sir William Reinout van Tuyll van Serooskerken KCH (1777 – 26 December 1864) was a Dutch British Army officer.

== Career ==
Tuyll served as aide-de-camp to Lord Uxbridge during the Peninsular War, and the Walcheren Campaign in 1809. He became lieutenant-colonel on half-pay of the 25th Light Dragoons in February 1812 and colonel of 7th Light Dragoons in March 1846. While still in this position, he died on 26 December 1864.

He fought in India. He was private secretary to the Viceroy of Ireland, and one of the founders of the Oriental Club. He was appointed a Knight Commander of the Royal Guelphic Order and died on 26 December 1864.
