= Dugald McTavish Lumsden =

British military officer (1851–1915)

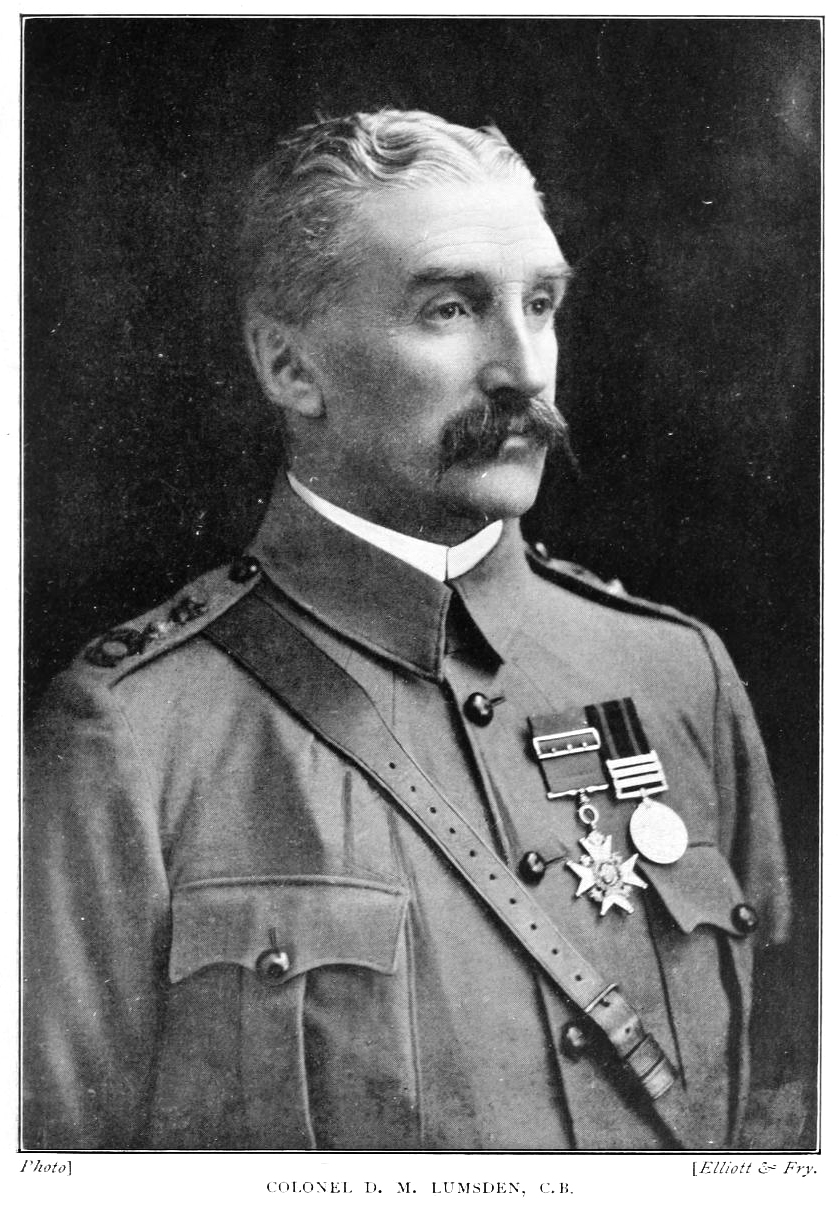
Colonel Dugald McTavish Lumsden

Lumsden's grave in Brookwood Cemetery in 2018

Colonel Dugald McTavish Lumsden CB (5 March 1851 – 10 May 1915) was a Scottish-born British army officer who founded the cavalry unit Lumsden's Horse in India in 1899.

Lumsden was the oldest of the four sons of James Lumsden (1812–1882) and Grace (née McTavish, died 1894) of Peterhead in Aberdeenshire, Scotland. Aged 22 Lumsden obtained a post with the Borelli Tea Estate in the Tezpur district of Assam. On arriving in India Lumsden attempted to popularise the volunteer movement in Assam, perhaps taking the volunteer movement in his native Scotland as his model. When the Durrung Mounted Rifles was founded in 1887 Lumsden was appointed a captain in the force. In 1888 this unit was renamed the Assam Valley Light Horse and Lumsden commanded F Squadron in the Durrung District.

Lumsden left India in 1893 but maintained contact with his comrades there, which was useful six years later when he raised Lumsden's Horse to fight in the Boer War in South Africa. In December 1899, Lumsden was travelling in Australia so he cabled his contacts in Calcutta about raising a unit there and took passage on the first available ship to India. On 10 January 1900, adverts appeared in the London newspapers requesting men and money for the new volunteer unit. The response was so great that Lumsden could have raised 1,000 volunteers. Lumsden's Horse and 'Colonel Lumsden's Corps' was the name given to the new Indian Mounted Infantry Corps which was raised from volunteers from various existing Indian regiments, including the Assam Valley Light Horse. Colonel Lumsden contributed 50,000 rupees towards the cost of founding the Corps. He set an age limit of between 20 and 40 years and preferred unmarried men.

The Corps left Calcutta 250 strong in February 1900 to take part in the Boer War, under the command of Field Marshal Lord Roberts. The Corps took part in the march to Bloemfontein, the occupation of Johannesburg and Pretoria, the pursuit of de Wet, and the Barberton and De Kaap campaigns against the Boers.

Lieutenant-Colonel Lumsden was formally appointed Commandant of Lumsden's Horse in March 1900, with Lieutenant-Colonel Eden Showers from the Surma Valley Light Horse as second in command. Showers was succeeded by Major Henry Chamney in late April 1900. Lumsden was appointed a Companion in the Order of the Bath (CB) on 19 April 1901.

Dugald McTavish Lumsden died in London in 1915 and was buried in Brookwood Cemetery in Surrey. He never married and in his will he left £22,492 17s 5d to several relatives.
