= Iqbal al-Daula Bahadur =

Iqbal al-Daula Bahadur (1808–1888) was the pretender to the throne of Oudh, grandson of Saadat Ali Khan II, the sixth Nawab.
