= 242nd Brigade (United Kingdom) =

- Active: 1920
- Country: United Kingdom
- Branch: British Army
- Type: Infantry Brigade
- Engagements: Occupation of Turkey

Commanders
- Notable commanders: Brig.-Gen. F.S. Montague-Bates

242nd Brigade (242 Bde) was an infantry formation composed of British and Indian troops, which served in Turkey during the Occupation of Constantinople after World War I

== History ==
242 Brigade was formed around Izmit, about 100 km east of Constantinople, on 30 March 1920 by General Headquarters of the British Army of Occupation. Under the command of Brigadier-General F.S. Montague-Bates, 242 Bde initially comprised three Indian Army battalions, with a proportion of British Army support troops, all drawn from 28th Division, which was serving in Turkey at the time; a British infantry battalion (1st Gordon Highlanders, from the Army of Occupation in Germany) was soon added. The brigade was formally attached to 28th Division from 6 June to 15 September 1920.

== Order of battle ==
During its short existence, 242 Bde was constituted as follows:

- General Officer Commanding: Brig.-Gen. F.S. Montague-Bates
  Brig.-Gen. H.A.V. Cummins
- 1st Battalion Gordon Highlanders
- 1st Battalion 10th Jats
- 1st Battalion 21st Punjabis
- 1st Battalion 25th Punjabis

Attached:

- 20th Hussars
- Anatolian Mounted Infantry
- 51st Battery Royal Field Artillery (18-pounders) from 39th Field Brigade
- Section 39th Field Brigade Ammunition Column
- 26th Field Company Royal Engineers
- One company 2nd Battalion 128th Pioneers
- One section Z Company Machine Gun Corps
- 84th Field Ambulance Royal Army Medical Corps
- A and B echelons Royal Army Service Corps

On 13 July the 20th Hussars took part in one of the last mounted actions by British cavalry, during an operation against Turkish nationalists.

During August Major-General Edmund Ironside took over command of the troops in the Izmit area (which became 'Ironside Force'). When Montague-Bates authorised a sortie over the River Sarkaria to protect his perimeter against attacks by Nationalist Turks, Ironside reprimanded him. One of Montague-Bates' staff reported that the two generals 'had heated words' and 'When Brigadier Bates came out of the meeting he was white with rage, said good-bye, and having collected his belongings left with hardly a word'. Montague-Bates returned to Constantinople and was sent home. He was replaced in command of 242 Bde by Brigadier-General H.A.V. Cummins.

In September 1920 the Greek Army took over the Izmit Front, which allowed the British Army of Occupation to be reduced. 242 Brigade was disbanded on 3 October and the troops dispersed, most of them joining 84th Brigade of 28th Division at Haydarpaşa.

== External sources ==
- Queen's Royal Surrey regimental website
- Great War Forum
- Land Forces of Britain, the Empire and Commonwealth (Regiments.org)
