= Count Eduard von Oriola =

Prussian lieutenant-general (1809–1862)

Count Eduard Ernst Lobo da Silveira von Oriola (20 April 1809 – 20 October 1862) was a notable Prussian Lieutenant-General (Generalleutnant) of Portuguese descent. His family title originated in Portugal and was officially recognized within the Kingdom of Prussia in 1822. He accompanied Prince Waldemar of Prussia on an expedition to India, where he fought in the First Anglo-Sikh War and was awarded the Pour le Mérite for his bravery.

== Military career and expeditions ==
- Global Expeditions: Between 1842 and 1843, he served as an adjutant to Prince Adalbert of Prussia during a diplomatic and exploratory voyage to Brazil. From 1844 to 1846, he accompanied Prince Waldemar of Prussia on a major expedition to India, exploring Tibet and the Himalayas.
- Battlefield Heroism: While in British India, the Prussian travel party became entangled in the First Anglo-Sikh War. Oriola fought alongside British forces and demonstrated exceptional bravery, particularly at the Battle of Ferozeshah (1845).
- Decorations: Upon returning to Europe, his battlefield performance earned him Prussia's highest military order, the Pour le Mérite, in December 1846.
- Royal Service: He later served as an aide-de-camp (Flügeladjutant) to King Frederick William IV of Prussia.

== Personal life ==
In 1853, Count Eduard married Maximiliane von Arnim (1818–1894), the daughter of the famous German Romantic writers Achim and Bettina von Arnim. She went on to become one of Berlin's most prominent literary and political salonnières. The couple had five children, including Waldemar von Oriola, who later became a German politician.
