= Lumsden's Horse =

Indian Mounted Infantry Corps

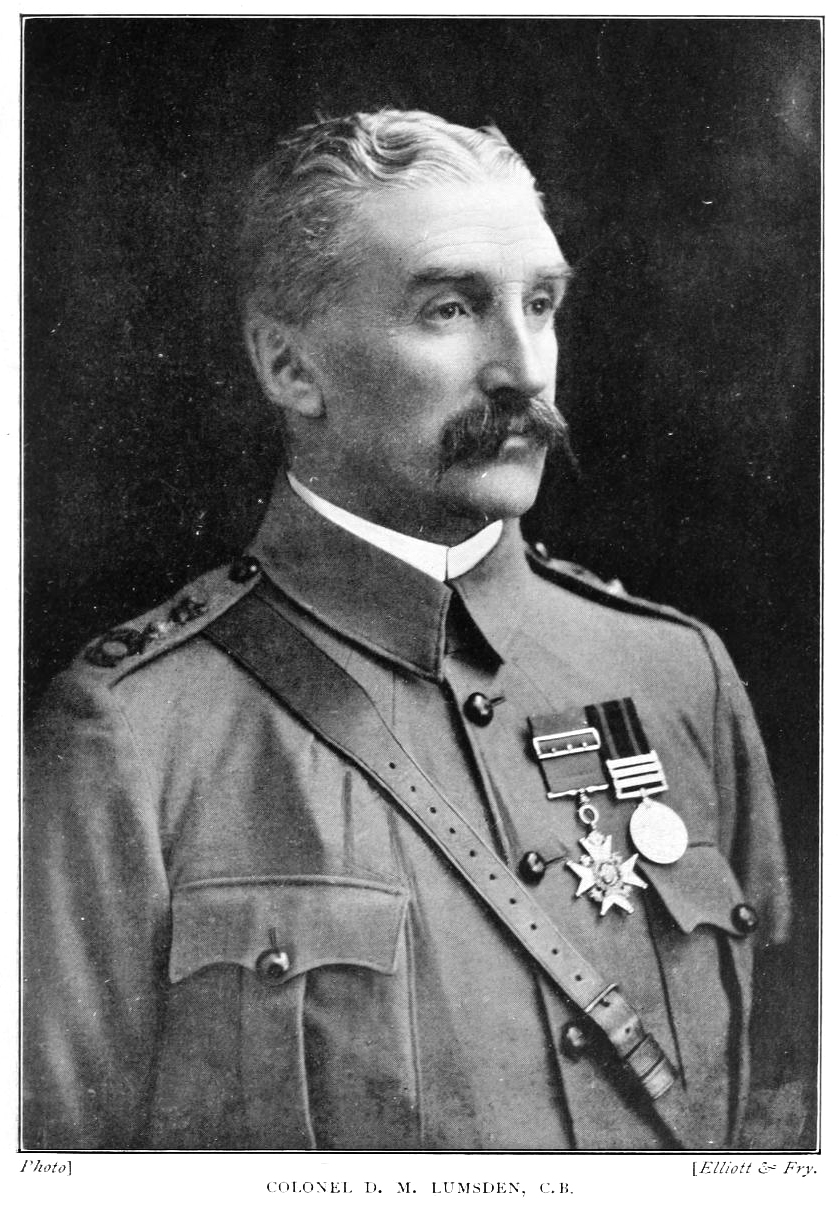
Colonel D.M. Lumsden

Lumsden's Horse, also known as Colonel Lumsden's Corps, was the name given to the Indian Mounted Infantry Corps, which was formed in Calcutta in 1899 by Lieutenant-Colonel Dugald McTavish Lumsden of the Assam Valley Light Horse. The new corps was raised from volunteers from various existing units of the Volunteer Corps in India, including the Assam Valley Light Horse. Colonel Lumsden contributed 50,000 rupees.

The Corps left Calcutta 250 strong in February 1900 to take part in the Second Boer War, under the command of Field Marshal Lord Roberts. The Corps took part in the march to Bloemfontein, the occupation of Johannesburg and Pretoria, the pursuit of de Wet, and the Barberton & De Kaap campaigns against the Boers.

Lord Curzon, Viceroy and Governor General of India placed a memorial tablet in St.Paul's Cathedral, Calcutta. It lists those of the Corps who died in action and in sickness.

Lieutenant-Colonel Dugald McTavish Lumsden was formally appointed Commandant in March 1900, with Lieutenant-Colonel Eden Showers from the Surma Valley Light Horse as second in command. Showers was succeeded by Major Henry Chamney in late April 1900.

This unit should not be confused with another regular Indian Army cavalry regiment, the famous Guides Cavalry, which was founded by Harry Burnett Lumsden, and whose surname was eventually added to that regimental title too: Queen Victoria's Own Guides Cavalry (Lumsden's).
