= Stratford (surname) =

Stratford is a surname of English origin.

Notable people with the surname Stratford or de Stratford include:

- Alfred Stratford (1853–1914), English national footballer and cricketer
- Andrew Stratford (died 1378), English landowner
- Benjamin Stratford, 4th Earl of Aldborough (1746–1833)
- Brice Stratford (born 1987), English actor, manager and writer
- Edward Stratford, 2nd Earl of Aldborough (1736–1801)
- Henry de Stratford, 14th century Greater Clerk of the Chancery under Edward III
- John Stratford, 1st Earl of Aldborough (c. 1691–1777)
- John Stratford, 3rd Earl of Aldborough (c. 1740–1823)
- John de Stratford (c. 1275–1348), Archbishop of Canterbury
- Nicholas Stratford (1633–1707), Bishop of Chester
- Ralph Stratford (c. 1300–1354), Bishop of London
- Robert de Stratford (c. 1292–1362), Chancellor of the Exchequer
- Thomas de Stratford (died 1396), Archdeacon of Gloucester, Prior of Caldwell
- William Samuel Stratford (1789–1853), English astronomer
- Zoe Stratford (born 1996) English World Cup winning rugby captain

== See also ==
- House of Stratford
- Cecil Wingfield-Stratford (1853–1939), English army officer and international footballer
- Esmé Cecil Wingfield-Stratford (1882–1971) English historian, writer, mind-trainer, outdoorsman, and ruralist
