= St Faith, Farmcote =

Small chapel in Farmcote, Gloucestershire

Coordinates: 51.95795°N 1.91218°W

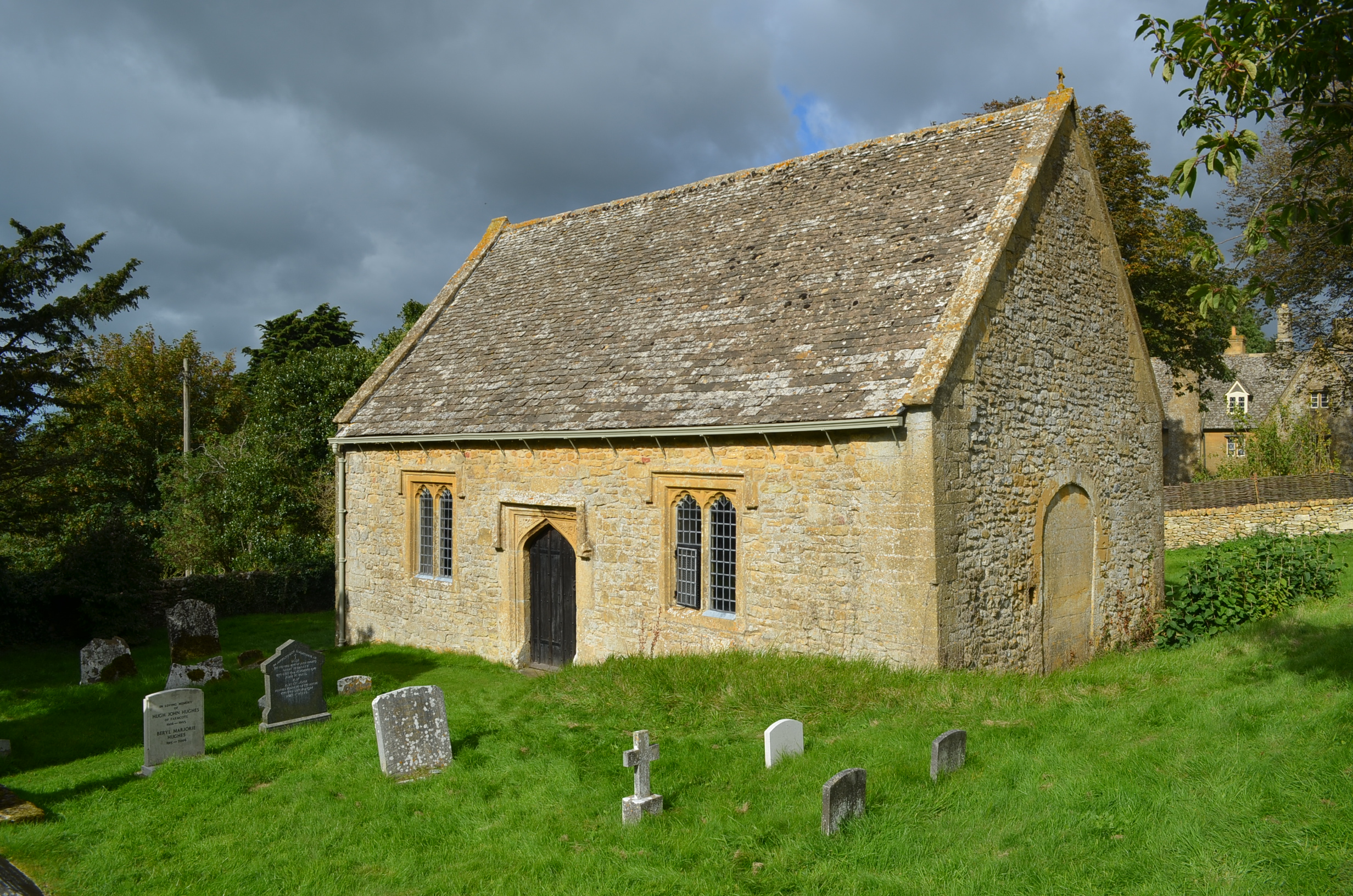
- St Faith, Farmcote
- St Faith, Farmcote
- Location: Gloucestershire
- Denomination: Anglican

Architecture
- Functional status: Monthly service
- Heritage designation: Grade I

Administration
- Province: Canterbury
- Diocese: Gloucester
- Archdeaconry: Cheltenham
- Parish: Guiting Power with Farmcote

St Faith, Farmcote is a small chapel located in the hamlet of Farmcote, Gloucestershire, two miles north-west of Temple Guiting. The original building, constructed with limestone rubble, dates to the Anglo-Saxon or early Norman period. Its original layout consisted of a rectangular nave and chancel; the chancel was later demolished. The remains of the early church are the Saxo-Norman nave, the damaged doorway and a rare double bellcote. It has been designated by English Heritage as a Grade I listed building.

== Description ==
St Faith is a chapel of ease located in Farmcote, Gloucestershire, two miles north-west of Temple Guiting. It stands on a sloping hill overlooking the Severn Valley. The church was constructed in the late Anglo-Saxon or early Norman period with limestone rubble. The church has a limestone roof with limestone coping. Its original, simple layout consisted of a rectangular nave and chancel; the chancel was later removed. The surviving original features of the church are the Saxo-Norman nave, a damaged doorway and a double bellcote. The church has two 15th-century stone-mullioned windows with cinquefioil cusped heads. The studded plank door is original.

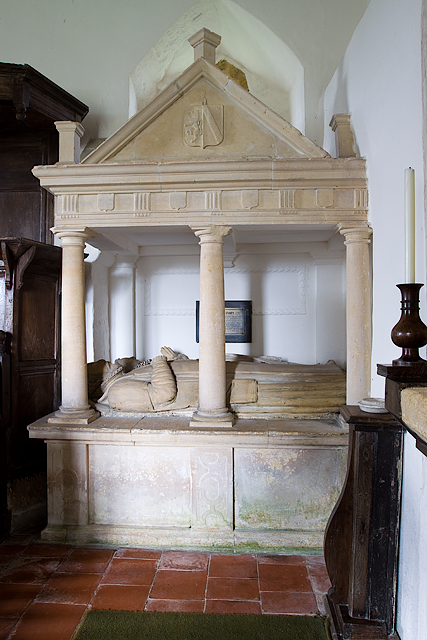
Stratford tomb

On the sanctuary's north wall is the late 16th-century limestone chest tomb of Henry and Mary Stratford. Mary Stratford's effigy appears to have been resized to fit the space. On the west wall is an Early English font with circular bowl on top of four pillars. There is a small piscina sitting on a column to the left of the altar. Most of the furnishings are from the Jacobean era and include an arcaded reading desk, a 17th-century chair with foliate carving, a canopied oak pulpit and oak benches (1597). The original 13th-century altar slab with five engraved crosses covers the 17th-century communion table.

The original early medieval timber roof truss inside the church has large, curved beams. Built into the apex of the west gable end is a rare Norman double-arched bellcote. The surviving bell hangs inside the nave. The red tile floor was installed in the 19th century. The exterior doorway is embellished with Tudor rose spandrel carvings. On the north exterior wall is a blocked door with a rounded arch.

== History ==
St Faith's church dates to the late Saxon or early Norman period. The church began as a chapel of ease to the church at Guiting Power, five miles away. Archaeological excavations in the late 19th century revealed that the church originally had a semi-circular chancel; its remains now lie below-ground. The nearby manor house, south of the church, was built in 1320 by the Stratford family. Notable Stratford family members include John de Stratford, his brother Robert de Stratford and Ralph Stratford. The churchs has been designated by English Heritage as a Grade I listed building.
