= John Stratford =

John Stratford may refer to:

- John de Stratford (died 1348), Archbishop of Canterbury, Treasurer and Chancellor of England
- John Stratford (entrepreneur) (c. 1582–c. 1634), Elizabethan and Jacobean merchant and entrepreneur, and significant tobacco grower in the Cotswolds
- John Stratford, 1st Earl of Aldborough (c. 1691–1777), Irish MP for Baltinglass 1721–1763
- John Stratford, 3rd Earl of Aldborough (c. 1740–1823), Irish MP for Baltinglass 1763–1777 and 1790–1801, and Wicklow County
- John Stratford (mayor) (died c. 1501), mayor of Winchester
- John Stratford (verderer) (1380–1433), English verderer and landowner

== See also ==
- House of Stratford
