= John Stratford (mayor) =

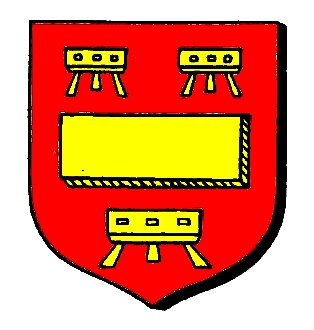
Coat of arms associated with John Stratford: Gules, a fess humette between three trestles, or

John Stratford (died about 1501), was a medieval Mayor of Winchester.

John was born into a cadet branch of the aristocratic House of Stratford, a descendant of John Stratford and Andrew de Stratford, and relative of the de Inkepenne family. He lived in St Mary Kalendar parish, was mayor of Winchester in the years 1482–1483, 1490–1491, and 1499–1500. By 1478 his extensive Winchester estate had incorporated a number of surrounding tenements and gardens, as well as the ruins of Saint Martin church.
