= Farm Cove =

Farm Cove can mean one of at least three places:

- Farm Cove, New South Wales, in Sydney Harbour, Australia
- Farm Cove, New Zealand, suburb of Auckland, New Zealand
- Farm Cove, bay in Macquarie Harbour, Tasmania, Australia

== See also ==
- Farmcote
