= Didbrook =

Village in Gloucestershire, England

Coordinates: 51.9804°N 1.9233°W

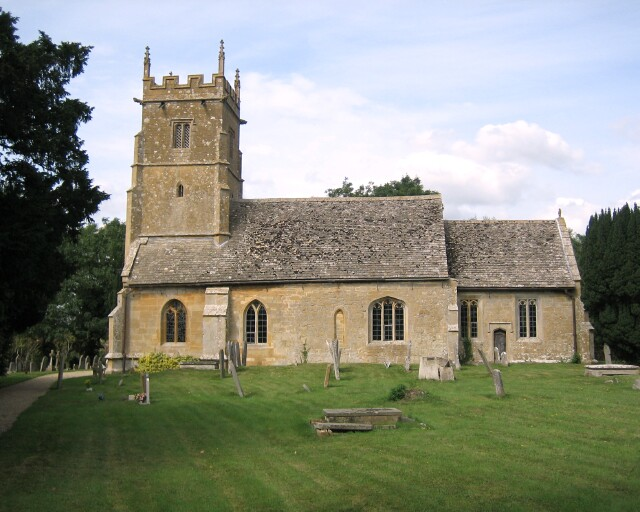
- St George's Church

- Location within Gloucestershire
- Civil parish: Stanway
- District: Tewkesbury
- Shire county: Gloucestershire
- Region: South West
- Country: England
- Sovereign state: United Kingdom
- Post town: Cheltenham
- Postcode district: GL54
- Police: Gloucestershire
- Fire: Gloucestershire
- Ambulance: South Western

Didbrook is a village in the civil parish of Stanway, in the Tewkesbury district, in Gloucestershire, England, 8 miles (13 km) north-east of Cheltenham. The village lies near the foot of the Cotswold escarpment. In 1931 the parish had a population of 160.

Didbrook was an ancient parish, which became a civil parish in 1866. The parish included the township of Pinnock and Hyde, a large detached part high on the Cotswolds. Pinnock and Hyde became a separate civil parish in 1866. On 1 April 1935 the civil parish of Didbrook was abolished, and most of it was absorbed into the parish of Stanway. A smaller part was absorbed into the parish of Toddington.

The parish church of St George dates back to the 13th century. It was partly rebuilt about 1475 by William Whitchurch, the last abbot of Hailes Abbey, and has been little changed since then. It is now a Grade I listed building.

There is a primary school in the village, now known as Isbourne Valley School.

There is also a Type 22 Pillbox opposite the school built in 1940 which was part of the defence of Britain from German Invasion.
