= Pinnock and Hyde =

Former civil parish in Gloucestershire, England

Coordinates: 51.952°N 1.891°W

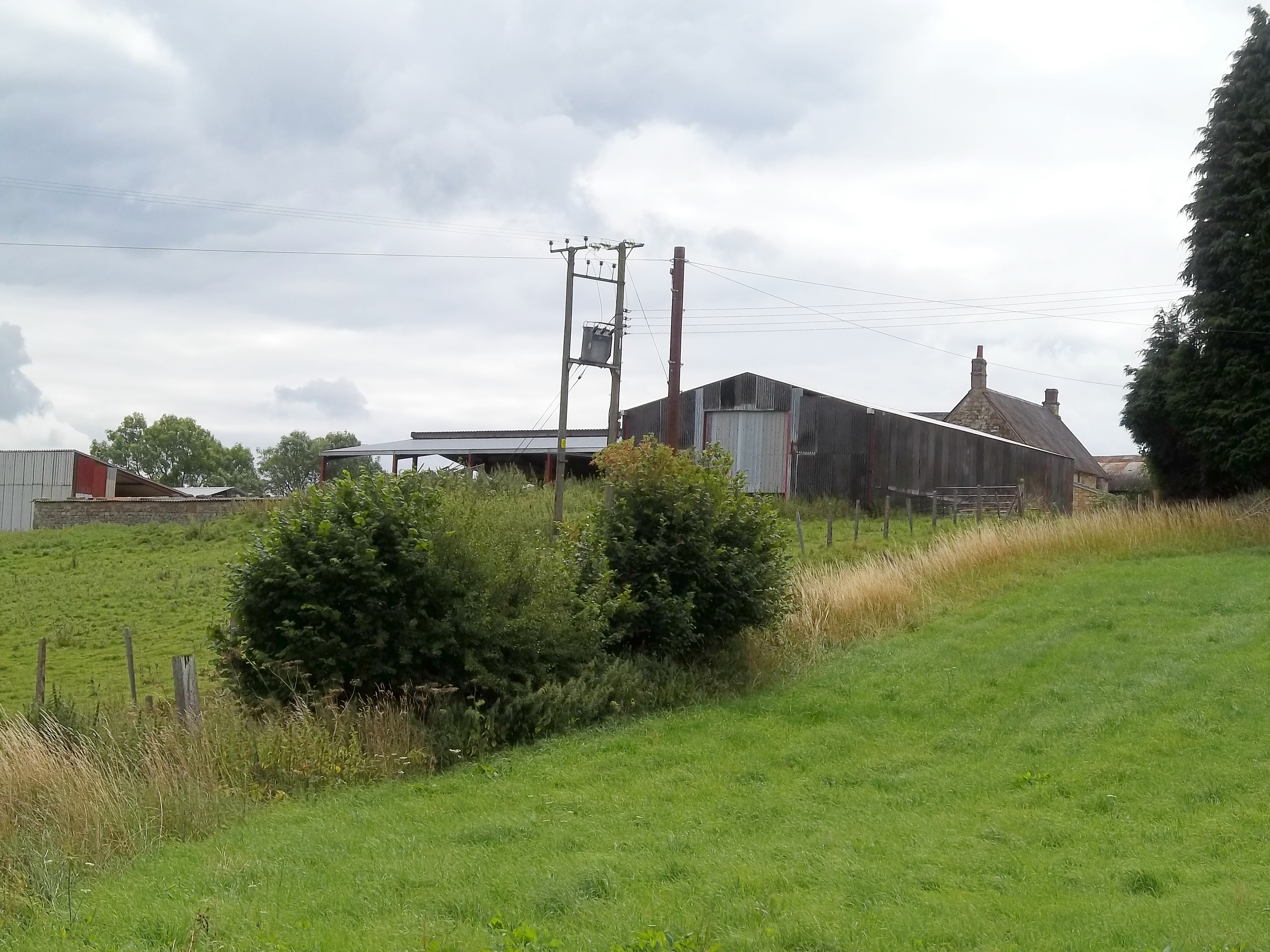
- Pinnock Farm

- Location within Gloucestershire
- Civil parish: Temple Guiting
- District: Cotswold
- Shire county: Gloucestershire
- Region: South West
- Country: England
- Sovereign state: United Kingdom

Pinnock and Hyde was a township and civil parish in the Cotswolds in Gloucestershire, England. It lies 4 miles (6.4 km) east of the town of Winchcombe. Pinnock was a medieval village, later deserted, and is now a single farm. Hyde consists of a farm and a few houses on the west bank of the infant River Windrush. In 1931 the parish had a population of 70.

Pinnock was mentioned in the Domesday Book of 1086, as Pignocsire, with a population estimated as at least 25. By 1563 there were only three households there. Today the remains of the medieval village are visible as earthworks north of Pinnock Farm.

Hyde is a shrunken medieval village, but traces of medieval buildings have not been found.

Pinnock and Hyde became a township of the ancient parish of Didbrook. It was a detached part of that parish, and had its own rectory but no church. It became a separate civil parish in 1866, although its population in 1881 was only 29. The civil parish was significantly enlarged in 1883, when the chapelry of Farmcote was added to it. In 1935 the civil parish was abolished and absorbed into the parish of Temple Guiting.
