= Michael Northburgh =

Bishop of London (died 1361)

- Bishop of London
- Elected: 22 April 1354
- Term ended: 9 September 1361
- Predecessor: Ralph Stratford
- Successor: Simon Sudbury
- Previous post: Archdeacon of Suffolk

Orders
- Consecration: 12 July 1355

Personal details
- Died: 9 September 1361
- Denomination: Roman Catholic

Michael Northburgh, otherwise Michael de Northburgh (Northborough), was the Bishop of London between 1354 and his death in 1361. He was the nephew of Roger Northburgh, Bishop of Coventry and Lichfield.

Northburgh's uncle's influence enabled him to be appointed Archdeacon of Chester in 1341 (until forced to resign in 1342) and Archdeacon of Suffolk in 1347 (until 1353) before he had been ordained into higher orders. Whilst archdeacon he became Rector of Pulham St. Mary (1341) and acquired many canonries. He occupied the office of Lord Privy Seal between 1350 and 1354.

Northburgh was elected Bishop of London on 22 April 1354 and consecrated on 12 July 1355. His most lasting achievement as bishop was in helping to found the Charterhouse. He bought land from Sir Walter de Manny and by his will left £2000 'for the foundation of a House according to the ritual of the Carthusian order in a place commonly called "Newchirchehawe", where there is a church of the Annunciation of the Blessed Virgin Mary.

Northburgh accompanied King Edward III of England on the English expedition to France which included the Battle of Crécy (1346) and acted as royal clerk, writing an eyewitness account in a newsletter from the English camp, and giving the French casualties as 1,542 "without reckoning the commons and foot-soldiers".

Northburgh died of the plague on 9 September 1361. In his will he left valuable books and artifacts to the illegitimate Michael Northborough, a future Archdeacon of Colchester.

== Notes ==
Political offices
Preceded by Simon Islip	Lord Privy Seal; 1350–1354	Succeeded by Thomas Bramber
Catholic Church titles
Preceded by Ralph Stratford	Bishop of London; 1354–1361	Succeeded by Simon Sudbury
