= Thomas de Stratford =

- Archdeacon of Gloucester
- Church: Catholic
- See: Diocese of Gloucester
- Predecessor: Richard de Ledbury
- Successor: Roger Peres

Personal details
- Born: Warwickshire
- Died: 12 June 1396

Thomas de Stratford (also called Thomas Stratford) was a medieval Archdeacon of Gloucester of the Noble House of Stratford.

== Early life ==
Stratford attended Oxford University and in 1348 and 1349 held the position of Senior Proctor. He was born into the wealthy Stratford Family of Stratford-on-Avon, and was related to Ralph Stratford (Bishop of London), Sir Andrew de Stratford, John de Stratford (Archbishop of Canterbury) and Robert de Stratford (Bishop of Chester) - possibly a younger brother to the latter two, alongside Henry de Stratford.

== Career ==
By 1367 Thomas was Archdeacon of Gloucester, and in lifelong possession of the manor of Shottery, having been given it by his (possible) brother Robert, who had in turn received it from his brother John. In 1369, however, he was reported as "dwelling in London".

== Later life and death ==
From 10 October 1375 until his death on 12 June 1396 Thomas de Stratford held the position of Prior of Caldwell.
