= Richard de Wentworth =

Bishop of London and Chancellor of England (died 1339)

- Bishop of London
- Elected: 4 May 1338
- Term ended: 8 December 1339
- Predecessor: Stephen Gravesend
- Successor: Ralph Stratford

Orders
- Consecration: 12 July 1338

Personal details
- Died: 8 December 1339
- Denomination: Catholic

Richard de Wentworth was a medieval Bishop of London.

Wentworth was a canon of St. Paul's when he was named Lord Privy Seal on 25 March 1337, holding that office until early July 1338.

Wentworth was elected bishop on 4 May 1338 and consecrated on 12 July 1338.

Wentworth was named Lord Chancellor of England on 6 July 1338 and held that office until his death.

Wentworth died on 8 December 1339.

== Citations ==
Political offices
Preceded by William de la Zouche	Lord Privy Seal; 1337–1338	Succeeded by William Kilsby
Preceded by Robert Stratford	Lord Chancellor; 1338–1339	Succeeded by John de Stratford
Catholic Church titles
Preceded by Stephen Gravesend	Bishop of London; 1338–1339	Succeeded by Ralph Stratford
