= Godfrey Lill =

Irish politician and judge

Godfrey Lill (born 1719, died 1783 in Enniskillen) was an Irish politician, Solicitor-General for Ireland, and judge of the Court of Common Pleas (Ireland). He became the Member of Parliament for Fore in 1761 and Baltinglass in 1768. He was appointed as Solicitor-General in 1770, and a judge of the Court of Common Pleas in 1774.

== Early life ==
He was born in Dublin, third son of Thomas Lill. He was educated at Trinity College Dublin, where he was a scholar in 1737: he took his Bachelor of Arts degree in 1739 and his master's degree in 1741. He was considered one of the finest students of his generation. He entered Middle Temple in 1738, and was called to the Irish bar in 1743.

== Family ==
He married Mary Bull, daughter of Nathaniel Bull of Surrey and had two daughters, Mary who married William Brereton, and Sarah who married Andrew Stewart, 1st Earl Castle Stewart. His father-in-law was an associate of the Duke of Newcastle, and Godfrey's rise to power is generally thought to have been due to the connection. He became Master in Chancery 1749–1760, King's Counsel in 1760, and Third Serjeant in 1767.

== Character ==
He was a skilful orator, nicknamed "Smooth Godfrey" but in his career was often accused of poor judgement, hesitating before accepting a position on the bench, and refusing twice to become Chief Justice.

Parliament of Ireland
Preceded by Robert Perceval; Lord Delvin	Member of Parliament for Fore; 1761–1768; With: John Newenham	Succeeded by Thomas Eyre; John Armstrong
Preceded by John Stratford; Edward Stratford	Member of Parliament for Baltinglass; 1768–1775; With: John Stratford	Succeeded by John Stratford; Edward Stratford
Legal offices
Preceded by Marcus Paterson	Solicitor-General for Ireland; 1770–1774	Succeeded by John Scott
