= Earl of Aldborough =

Peerage of Ireland title

Arms of Stratford, Earl of Aldborough: Barry of ten argent and azure, a lion rampant gules

Earl of Aldborough, of the Palatinate of Upper Ormond, was a title in the Peerage of Ireland held by the Stratford family. It was created on 9 February 1777, along with the courtesy title of Viscount Amiens, for John Stratford, 1st Viscount Aldborough, a descendant of the English Stratford family. He had already been created Baron Baltinglass, of Baltinglass, in the County of Wicklow, on 21 May 1763, and Viscount Aldborough, of the Palatinate of Upper Ormond, on 22 July 1776. These titles were also in the Peerage of Ireland. Three of his sons, the second, third and fourth Earls, all succeeded in the titles. They became extinct on the death of the latter's grandson, the sixth Earl, in 1875.

== Earls of Aldborough (1777) ==
- John Stratford, 1st Earl of Aldborough (1697–1777)
- Edward Stratford, 2nd Earl of Aldborough (1736–1801)
- John Stratford, 3rd Earl of Aldborough (c. 1740–1823)
- Benjamin O'Neale Stratford, 4th Earl of Aldborough (c. 1746–1833)
- Mason Gerard Stratford, 5th Earl of Aldborough (1784–1849)
- Benjamin O'Neale Stratford, 6th Earl of Aldborough (1808–1875)
