= Baltinglass (Parliament of Ireland constituency) =

Pre-1801 Irish constituency

- Former borough constituency for the Irish House of Commons
- County: County Wicklow
- Borough: Baltinglass

1664–1801
- Seats: 2
- Replaced by: Disfranchised

Baltinglass was a constituency represented in the Irish House of Commons until its abolition on 1 January 1801.

== Borough ==
This was a parliamentary borough based in the town of Baltinglass in County Wicklow.

In the Patriot Parliament of 1689 summoned by James II, Baltinglass was not represented.

== Members of Parliament, 1664–1801 ==
- 1665–1666 Richard Bulkeley

=== 1689–1801 ===
Year	First member	First party	Second member	Second party
1689	Baltinglass was not represented in the Patriot Parliament			
1692	Sir James Shaen, 1st Bt		Richard Thompson	
1696	Charles Ricasey		Richard Thompson	
1703	Charles Ricasey		Edward Stratford	
1715	Jeffrey Paul		Edward Stratford	
1721	John Stratford		Edward Stratford	
1727	John Stratford		Daniel Falkiner	
1759	John Stratford		Edward Stratford (Note: Styled as The Honourable from 1763)	
1763	Hon. John Stratford		Edward Stratford	
1768	Hon. John Stratford		Godfrey Lill	
1775	Hon. John Stratford		Hon. Edward Stratford	
1777	Hon. Benjamin Stratford		John Godley	
1783	Warden Flood		James Somerville (Note: Declared not duly elected in 1783)	
1784	Warden Flood		Sir John Johnson, 1st Bt	
1790	Hon. John Stratford		Hon. Benjamin Stratford	
1801	Constituency disenfranchised			

== Bibliography ==
- O'Hart, John (2007). The Irish and Anglo-Irish Landed Gentry: When Cromwell came to Ireland. Vol. II. Heritage Books. ISBN 0-7884-1927-7.
- Leigh Rayment's historical List of Members of the Irish House of Commons. Cites: Johnston-Liik, Edith Mary (2002). The History of the Irish Parliament 1692-1800 (6 volumes). Ulster Historical Foundation.
