= Farmcote Grange =

Monastic grange in Gloucestershire, England

Coordinates: 51.9584°N 1.9136°W

Farmcote Grange was a medieval monastic grange at Farmcote in Gloucestershire, England.

It was a grange of Hailes Abbey.
