= Thomas de Baumburgh =

English clerk of the chancery and keeper of the great seal (fl. 1332)

Thomas de Baumburgh (fl. 1332) was an English official, clerk of the chancery and keeper of the great seal. He is mentioned in 1328 as then holding the living of Emildon in Northumberland, to which he had been presented by the king.

== Biography ==
In 1332 he was receiver of petitions from England in the parliament, as also in 1340. Between 1 April and 23 June 1332 he was one of the keepers of the great seal, and again between 13 January and 17 February 1334, John de Stratford, bishop of Winchester, being chancellor on both occasions. He again held this important office between 6 and 19 July 1338, during the chancellorship of Richard de Bynteworth, bishop of London, and once more upon that chancellor's death between 8 December 1339 and 16 February 1340, during which period the chancellorship was vacant. After this date no more is heard of him. He held land at Baumburgh (now Bamborough) in Northumberland, whence his name.
