= John Nunn (RAF officer) =

British Royal Air Force officer, mathematician, and politician

- Born: 11 April 1919; Finchley, Middlesex, England
- Died: 3 July 2013 (aged 94)
- Military career
- Allegiance: United Kingdom
- Branch: Royal Air Force
- Service years: 1938–1966
- Rank: Wing Commander
- Commands: No. 210 Squadron RAF (1954–57)
- Conflicts: Second World War
- Awards: Distinguished Flying Cross; Air Efficiency Award

Wing Commander John Leslie Nunn, DFC, AE (11 April 1919 – 3 July 2013) was a British Royal Air Force (RAF) officer, mathematician, and politician. He served as an RAF pilot during the Second World War and, having been taken prisoner, was involved in The Great Escape. It was his miscalculations that caused the tunnel to be too short. This meant the escapees were visible to guards in the camp and only three men successfully escaped. He continued to serve in the RAF after the war specialising in navigation and intelligence. After retiring from the military he worked at IBM and as a Conservative Party councillor. He was Mayor of Winchester from 1992 to 1993.

== Early life ==
Nunn was born on 11 April 1919 in Finchley, Middlesex, England. He was educated at Mill Hill School, a private boys school in Mill Hill, north London. He went on to study maths and statistics at University College London. He graduated in 1939 gaining a Bachelor of Science (BSc).

== Military career ==
Nunn joined the University of London Air Squadron in 1938, when he was studying for his degree. Having held the rank of sergeant, he was commissioned into the Royal Air Force Volunteer Reserve on 3 October 1939 as a pilot officer. He was given the service number 74685. It was gazetted on 3 December 1939 that he had been promoted to flying officer back dated to 3 October. He was posted to RAF Bomber Command and flew bombing sorties over German–occupied Europe. He completed 14 operations with No. 207 Squadron RAF flying the Avro Manchester bomber. He then joined No. 97 Squadron RAF in July 1941, continuing to fly the Avro Manchester.

=== Prisoner of war ===
On 16 August 1941, Nunn was shot down over Belgium while on a mission to bomb Düsseldorf, Germany. Following interrogation by Nazi Luftwaffe intelligence officers, he was sent to Stalag Luft III prisoner-of-war camp. On 3 October 1941, his commission was confirmed. He was appointed head of the mathematics faculty of Stalag Luft III's extensive educational programme. His assistance was sought by Squadron Leader Roger Bushell, organiser of The Great Escape, to calculate precisely how long a tunnel should be to reach the woodland beyond the camp's perimeter wire. He used trigonometry to come to a figure as it could not be found using the usual method of pacing for fear the guards would discover their plans. However, the tunnel proved too short.

On 24 March 1944, when the break-out occurred, prisoners were spotted escaping as the tunnel ended in the open ground between the camp fence and the tree line. Nunn was still inside the camp when this occurred, though he had planned to pose as a French businessman and cycle to neutral Switzerland upon his escape. He rarely spoke of the Great Escape given that his slight miscalculation led to the tunnel being discovered while it was in use; something he described as his lifelong regret.

=== Post-war service ===
Nunn was repatriated to the United Kingdom in 1945. He was made temporary squadron leader on 1 April 1946 with seniority from 1 July 1945. On 24 December 1946, it was gazetted that he had transferred to the Royal Air Force on a permanent commission. He retained his wartime rank of flight lieutenant dated to 1 September 1945. He was promoted to squadron leader on 1 August 1947. He specialised in navigation and intelligence during this period, and he was posted to Aeroplane and Armament Experimental Establishment where he flew the Avro Lancaster.

Nunn was promoted to wing commander on 1 January 1954 as part of the half-yearly promotions. He was posted to the Ministry of Defence's joint planning staff to assist in the creation of the South-East Asia Treaty Organisation. From December 1955 to January 1957, he was commanding officer of No. 210 Squadron RAF based at RAF Topcliffe, Yorkshire. With them he flew Lockheed P-2 Neptune, a maritime patrol aircraft. His squadron patrolled the Mediterranean in the run up to Operation Musketeer in 1956. He was post to Bangkok in 1957, where he served on the staff of the South-East Asia Treaty Organisation that he had helped create. His final posting, from 1963 to 1966, was to the Operational Requirements branch of the Air Department in the newly expanded Ministry of Defence.

Nunn retired from the Royal Air Force on 11 April 1966.

== Later life ==
In 1966, following his retirement from the RAF, Nunn joined the government branch of IBM. He retired from the company in 1982.

In 1982, Nunn was elected a Conservative Party councillor to the Winchester City Council for the ward of Droxford, Soberton and Hambledon. He served as group leader from 1984 to 1988 and vice-chairman of the planning committee from 1985 to 1991. He was Mayor of Winchester from 1992 to 1993. He stepped down from the council in 1994.

Nunn died on 3 July 2013, aged 94. A memorial service was held on 26 July at Hambledon Church, Hambledon, Hampshire.

== Personal life ==
Nunn was married to Joan (née Kelly) who had been an RAF doctor. Together, they had a son and a daughter. Joan died in 1989 and he did not remarry.

== Honours and decorations ==

On 16 March 1943 with effect from 9 September 1942, Nunn was awarded the Distinguished Flying Cross (DFC). It was awarded for landing his damaged Avro Manchester bomber on the night of 16 August 1941 while on a mission to bomb Düsseldorf, Germany, thereby saving the lives of his crew.

Distinguished Flying Cross (DFC)
1939–45 Star with Bomber Command clasp
Air Crew Europe Star
Defence Medal
War Medal 1939–1945
Air Efficiency Award (AE)
