= Mayor of Winchester =

- Arms of the City of Winchester

- Incumbent; Jamie Scott since 20 May 2026
- Winchester City Council
- Style: The Right Worshipful the Mayor of Winchester
- Member of: Winchester City Council
- Residence: Abbey House
- Nominator: Political parties
- Appointer: Winchester City Council
- Term length: One year

The Office of Mayor of Winchester is the second oldest mayoralty in England, dating back to the period when Winchester was the capital of Wessex and England. The Mayor of Winchester thus stands second only to the Lord Mayor of the City of London in the order of precedence of civic heads.

Winchester is one of just five local authorities in England to have an official residence for its Mayor. Abbey House was built in about 1700 and sited in the Abbey Gardens just off The Broadway in Winchester. It was acquired by the City Council in 1889. The house stands on the site of a monastic establishment known as Nunnaminster and later as St Mary's Abbey, which was founded around AD900 by Alfred's Queen Ealhswith. The Abbey survived until the late 1530s when it was formally surrendered to the Crown as part of the Dissolution of the Monasteries.

== History ==
The exact date of the conferment of full mayoral rights is not known, since the original charter cannot be traced. When London petitioned the King for a grant of mayoralty in 1190, Winchester was not cited as precedent (as were certain French cities), but by 1200 there was reference to the mayoralty as an existing office. It is, therefore, safe to say that the office dates back to the 1190s. The incumbent for 2020-21 is described as the town's 821st mayor.

The earliest Mayors sometimes held the office for several years in succession, but from the 13th century to the present day, the Mayor has been chosen annually. Until the 16th century, the Mayor-elect was required to travel to Westminster to receive the royal assent.

The office developed during the medieval period when Winchester remained an important administrative, commercial and ecclesiastical centre. Early mayors possessed considerably greater executive authority than their modern successors and were responsible for aspects of the administration and governance of the city. Until the 16th century, a new elected Mayor of Winchester was required to travel to Westminster to receive royal assent to the appointment.

The role of the Mayor changed significantly following the Municipal Corporations Acts 1835, which reformed municipal government in England and Wales and removed much of the executive authority historically exercised by the mayors. The office subsequently developed into the predominantly civic and ceremonial role it holds today.

By tradition, the Mayor of Winchester takes precedence immediately after the Lord Mayor of London among English civic heads.

== Abbey House ==
The official residence of the Mayor of Winchester is Abbey House, situated in Abbey Gardens near the Broadway in the city centre. Winchester is one of a small number of English cities which provides an official residence for its Mayor.

The present House was constructed around 1700. It occupies part of the site of the former nunnaminster, later known as St Mary's Abbey, which was founded around AD900 by Ealhswith, wife of Alfred the Great.

Abbey House in Winchester

St Mary's Abbey survived for more than six centuries before being surrendered to the Crown during the Dissolution of the Monasteries in the late 1530s. Many of its building were subsequently demolished. By the early 18th century, William Pescod, Recorder of Winchester, had constructed a substantial town house of the site, surrounded by formal gardens. The property subsequently passed through several owners. Winchester city Council purchased Abbey House and its gardens in 1889 for public purposes. The gardens were opened to the public and the house was made available for the use of the serving Mayor.

Abbey House underwent extensive refurbishment in 1982-83, with its interiors restored in the 18th-century style and furnished partly with objects and artworks from the city's collections.

Today, the building is used for civic, community and social functions and for receiving visitors to Winchester.

== Mayors of Winchester ==
- 1403: Mark le Fayre
- 1482–1483, 1490–1491, 1499–1500: John Stratford (mayor)
- 1772–1773: Sir Paulet St John, 1st Baronet
- 1786–: (Sir) William Hillman (Clerk of the Green Cloth)
- 1802–1803: George William Chard, Mus Doc (also Organist of Winchester Cathedral)
- 1808–1809: Sir Henry St John-Mildmay, 4th Baronet

There is a list of all Winchester's Mayors from 1587 to 1912 in the last few pages of Warren's 1913 Winchester directory.

There is also a list of all Winchester's Mayors from 1184 to 1799 in pages 266 to 270 of volume 2 of the 1798 first edition of Rev John Milner's history of Winchester. That list is not considered to be reliable for the period pre 1200.

The following is a list of every person to have held the office of Mayor of Winchester since 1900:

- 1900–1901: Alfred Bowker
- 1901–1902: Bertram D Cancellor
- 1902–1903: James A. Fort (Liberal Unionist)
- 1903–1904: George Ward
- 1904–1905: Frederick Seymour Morgan
- 1905–1906: Chaloner Shenton
- 1906–1907: Reginald Harris
- 1907–1908: William Forder
- 1908–1909: Frederick King
- 1909–1910: Harold Stratton
- 1910–1911: John Furley
- 1911–1912: Frederick Holdaway
- 1912–1913: Howard Elkington
- 1913–1914: Harry Sealey
- 1914–1919: Alfred Edmeades
- 1919–1921: Arthur Dyer
- 1921–1922: Stanley Clifton
- 1922–1924: Herbert Vacher
- 1924–1925: Henry Johnson
- 1925–1926: William Hayward
- 1926–1928: Frederick Manley
- 1928–1929: William Symes
- 1929–1930: Harry Collis
- 1930–1931: Walter Hamblin
- 1931–1932: William Lansdell
- 1932–1933: Hew Ross
- 1933–1934: Frank Newton
- 1934–1935: John Hodder
- 1935–1936: Arthur Edmonds
- 1936–1937: John Pinsent
- 1937–1938: William Richardson
- 1938–1945: Francis Griffiths
- 1945–1946: Charles Sankey
- 1946–1947: Cyril Bones
- 1947–1949: Doris Crompton
- 1949–1950: Cyril Taylor
- 1950–1951: Reginald Evans
- 1951–1952: Arthur Edmonds
- 1952–1953: Doris Edmeades
- 1953–1954: Reginald Dutton
- 1954–1955: Adelaide Charles (died in office and replaced by Doris Edmeades)
- 1955–1956: Barbara Gertrude Thackeray
- 1956–1957: Major Paul Henry Benson Woodhouse
- 1957–1958: Evelyn Mary Barnes
- 1958–1959: Fendall W Harvey Pratt
- 1959–1960: Margaret E L Lowden
- 1960–1961: Lt Colonel Donald Charles Spelman
- 1961–1962: Vera Neate
- 1962–1963: John Hutchins
- 1963–1964: Dorothy Richards
- 1964–1965: Stanley Steel
- 1965–1966: Cyril Bones
- 1966–1967: Barbara Carpenter Turner
- 1967–1968: D Jeffrey Smith
- 1968–1969: Stewart Green
- 1969–1970: S E Spicer
- 1970–1971: Stanley Steel
- 1971–1972: Alice Cleary
- 1972–1973: T David Sermon
- 1973–1974: Cyril Taylor
- 1974–1975: Barbara Carpenter Turner
- 1975–1976: Alan Cotterill
- 1976–1977: Gwendoline Shave
- 1977–1978: David Ball
- 1978–1979: John Flook
- 1979–1980: John Green
- 1980–1981: M Pamela Pitt
- 1981–1982: Ian Bidgood
- 1982–1983: Albert Austen
- 1983–1984: Frederick Peachey
- 1984–1985: John Broadway
- 1985–1986: Jean Freeman
- 1986–1987: Sue Gentry
- 1987–1988: Major D Covill
- 1988–1989: Commander B Hall
- 1989–1990: Frederick Allgood
- 1990–1991: Pamela Peskett
- 1991–1992: Capt Richard Bates
- 1992–1993: Wing Cdr John Nunn
- 1993–1994: Susan Glasspool
- 1994–1995: Raymond Pearce
- 1995–1996: Patricia Norris
- 1996–1997: Brian 'Brandy' Blunt
- 1997–1998: Norman Hibdige
- 1998–1999: George Fothergill
- 1999–2000: Allan Mitchell
- 2000–2001: Georgina Busher
- 2001–2002: Therese Evans
- 2002–2003: John Steel
- 2003–2004: Jean Hammerton
- 2004–2005: Cecily Sutton
- 2005–2006: Neil Baxter
- 2006–2007: Sue Nelmes
- 2007–2008: Chris Pines
- 2008–2009: Michael Read
- 2009–2010: Dominic Hiscock
- 2010–2011: Richard Izard
- 2011–2012: Barry Lipscomb
- 2012–2013: Frank Pearson
- 2013–2014: Ernest Jeffs
- 2014–2015: Eileen Berry
- 2015–2016: Angela Clear
- 2016–2017: Jane Rutter
- 2017–2018: David McLean
- 2018–2019: Frank Pearson
- 2019–2020: Eleanor Bell
- 2020–2021: Patrick Cunningham
- 2021–2022: Vivian Achwal
- 2022–2023: Derek Green
- 2023-2024: Angela Clear
- 2024-2025: Russell Gordon-Smith
- 2025-2026: Sudhakar Achwal

== See also ==
- Local Government in the United Kingdom
- City of Winchester
