= Daniel Falkiner =

Lord Mayor of Dublin, Ireland

Daniel Falkiner (1683 – 20 January 1759) was an Irish politician.

He was the second son of Daniel Falkiner and his wife Rebecca Blackwell, widow of Henry Hamilton of Baileborough. His cousin was Sir Riggs Falkiner, 1st Baronet. He represented Baltinglass in the Irish House of Commons from 1727 until his death in 1759. In 1739, Falkiner was appointed Lord Mayor of Dublin.

He married Sarah Spence, daughter of George Spence. They had a daughter and a son. Sir Frederick Falkiner, 1st Baronet was his great-grandson.

Parliament of Ireland
Preceded by John Stratford; Edward Stratford	Member of Parliament for Baltinglass; 1727–1759; With: John Stratford	Succeeded by John Stratford; Edward Stratford
Civic offices
Preceded by John Macarroll	Lord Mayor of Dublin; 1739–1740	Succeeded by Samuel Cooke
