= Benjamin Stratford, 4th Earl of Aldborough =

Irish aristocrat and politician

Arms of Stratford, Earl of Aldborough: Barry of ten argent and azure, a lion rampant gules

Benjamin O'Neale Stratford, 4th Earl of Aldborough (1746 – 11 July 1833) styled The Honourable from 1763 until 1823, was an Irish peer and politician of the noble House of Stratford.

He was the fourth son of John Stratford, 1st Earl of Aldborough and his wife Martha O'Neale, daughter of Venerable Benjamin O'Neale, Archdeacon of Leighlin, and a younger brother of Edward Stratford, 2nd Earl of Aldborough. In 1823, he succeeded his older brother John as earl.

In 1777, Aldborough entered the Irish House of Commons for Baltinglass, the same constituency his father and his older brother has represented before, and sat as Member of Parliament until 1783. In 1790, he stood again for Baltinglass and was returned for it until the Act of Union in 1801. He was Governor of County Wicklow in 1777.

On 10 January 1774, he married Martha Burton, daughter of John Burton. They had a son and three daughters. Aldborough died at Stratford Lodge and was buried at Baltinglass. He was succeeded in his titles by his only son Mason.

Parliament of Ireland
Preceded by Hon. John Stratford; Hon. Edward Stratford	Member of Parliament for Baltinglass; 1777 – 1783; With: John Godley	Succeeded by Warden Flood; James Somerville
Preceded by Sir John Johnson, 1st Bt; Warden Flood	Member of Parliament for Baltinglass; 1790 – 1801; With: Hon. John Stratford	Succeeded by Parliament of the United Kingdom
Peerage of Ireland
Preceded by John Stratford	Earl of Aldborough; 1823 – 1833	Succeeded by Mason Stratford
