= John Stratford, 3rd Earl of Aldborough =

Irish peer

Arms of Stratford, Earl of Aldborough: Barry of ten argent and azure, a lion rampant gules

John Stratford, 3rd Earl of Aldborough (–1823), was an Irish peer and member of the House of Stratford. He was known as Hon. John Stratford until 1801 when he inherited the Earldom from his brother Edward Stratford, 2nd Earl of Aldborough.

== Background ==
He was the second son of John Stratford, 1st Earl of Aldborough, and his wife Martha O'Neale, daughter of the Venerable Benjamin O'Neale, of Mount Neale, County Carlow; sometime Archdeacon of Leighlin.

== Career ==
In 1763, Stratford replaced his father as a Member of Parliament (MP) for Baltinglass, upon the latter's elevation to the peerage. He held this seat until 1777. In 1776, he was returned to the Irish House of Commons for County Wicklow, replacing Ralph Howard, who had left the House to be elevated to the peerage as Baron Clonmore, and chose to sit for Wicklow in preference to Baltinglass. From 1790, he sat again for Baltinglass until the termination of the Irish Parliament in 1800 by the Act of Union. At the beginning of 1801, he succeeded his older brother Edward as earl.

In 1795, Stratford was appointed Governor of County Wicklow.

== Family ==
In April 1777, he married Elizabeth Hamilton, eldest daughter of Reverend Frederick Hamilton, Archdeacon of Raphoe and son of Lord Archibald Hamilton, and they had several daughters:

- Elizabeth, named after her mother, married John Halliday, later Tollemache, and had John Tollemache, 1st Baron Tollemache
- Louisa Martha (1778–1814), married Hon. John Rodney, son of George Rodney, 1st Baron Rodney
- Emily (died 1863), married Thomas Best (died 1829)
- Maria, married James Tate of Ballintaggart House, County Kildare

His granddaughter Marcia (née Tate, d.1893) married Anthony Lyster of Stillorgan (1797-1880) in 1825 and were the parents of Lieutenant General Harry Hammon Lyster VC.

Stratford died at Belan House in County Kildare in 1823 and lacking male issue, he was succeeded in his titles by his younger brother Benjamin. His wife died in 1845.

Parliament of Ireland
Preceded by John Stratford; Edward Stratford	Member of Parliament for Baltinglass; 1763–1777; With: Hon. Edward Stratford 1763–1768; Godfrey Lill 1768–1775; Hon. Edward Stratford 1775–1777	Succeeded by Hon. Benjamin Stratford; John Godley
Preceded by Ralph Howard; William Brabazon	Member of Parliament for County Wicklow; 1776–1790; With: William Brabazon 1776–1783; Nicholas Westby 1783–1790	Succeeded by William Hume; Nicholas Westby
Preceded by Sir John Johnson, 1st Bt; Warden Flood	Member of Parliament for Baltinglass; 1790–1801; With: Hon. Benjamin Stratford	Succeeded by Parliament of the United Kingdom
Peerage of Ireland
Preceded by Edward Stratford	Earl of Aldborough; 1801–1823	Succeeded by Benjamin Stratford
