= Henry de Stratford =

14th century English courtier

Henry de Stratford was a Greater Clerk of the Royal Chancery under Edward III, and member of the Noble House of Stratford.

== Life ==
He was born into the wealthy Stratford Family of Stratford-on-Avon, and was related to Ralph Stratford (Bishop of London), Andrew de Stratford (clerk and landowner), John de Stratford (Archbishop of Canterbury), Robert de Stratford (Bishop of Chester) and Archdeacon Thomas de Stratford. Henry was frequently owed money, and often involved in litigation. On 16 February 1325 he was inducted as the rector of a vacant church in North Berkhamstead (Lincoln) by John de Stratford, Bishop of Winchester. During the dispute between John de Stratford and Edward III in 1341 Henry was briefly imprisoned.
