= Farmcote =

Hamlet in Gloucestershire, England

Coordinates: 51.958°N 1.912°W

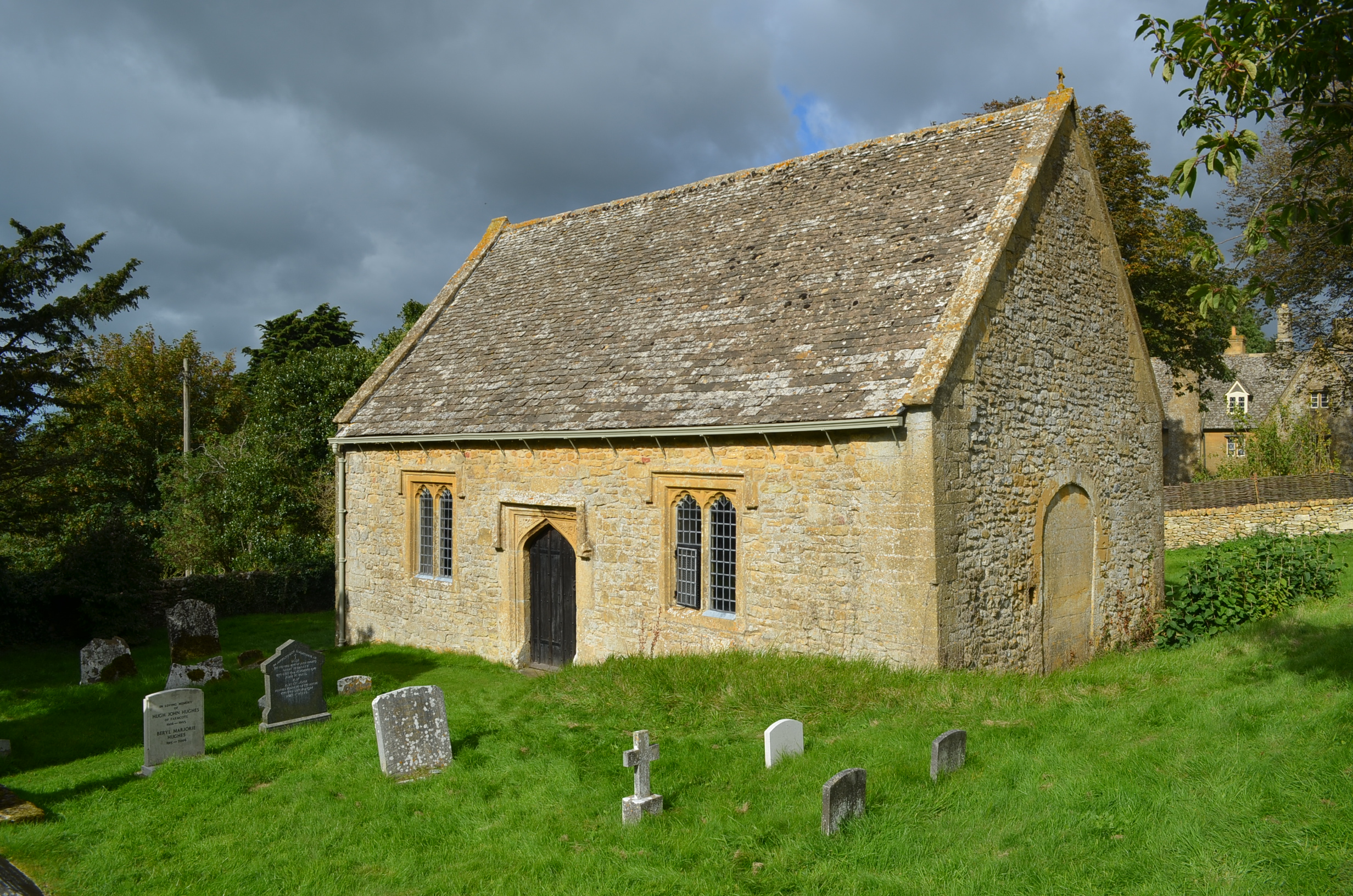
- St Faith's chapel

- Location within Gloucestershire
- OS grid reference: SP060289
- Civil parish: Temple Guiting
- District: Cotswold
- Shire county: Gloucestershire
- Region: South West
- Country: England
- Sovereign state: United Kingdom
- Post town: Cheltenham
- Postcode district: GL54
- Police: Gloucestershire
- Fire: Gloucestershire
- Ambulance: South Western
- UK Parliament: North Cotswolds

Farmcote is a hamlet in the Cotswolds in Gloucestershire, England. It lies 2 miles (3.2 km) east of the town of Winchcombe and 2 miles (3.2 km) west of Temple Guiting.

Farmcote is a small place, a few houses along a dead end lane, but has a long history. Beckbury Camp, half a mile north of the hamlet, is an Iron Age univallate hillfort. St Faith's chapel in the hamlet dates back to Saxon times.

Farmcote was mentioned in the Domesday Book of 1086, in the form Fernecote. The toponym is derived from the Old English fearn "fern" and cot "cottage", and so means "fern cottage(s)".

In the Middle Ages Hailes Abbey held land here, and built Farmcote Grange, the remains of which are still visible. In 1314 Stephen de Stratford was granted lordship of Farmcote Manor, and his Stratford family descendants held the manor until the estate was sold in 1756. Following the dissolution of Hailes Abbey in 1539 the Farmcote Stratfords occupied Great Farmcote Manor House. The manor house, still bearing the arms of the Stratford family, is now a Grade II listed building.

Farmcote became a chapelry of the parish of Guiting Power (also known as Lower Guiting), but in 1883 was transferred to the civil parish of Pinnock and Hyde. The civil parish of Pinnock and Hyde was abolished in 1935 and merged with the civil parish of Temple Guiting.
