= Edward Stratford, 2nd Earl of Aldborough =

Irish peer and politician

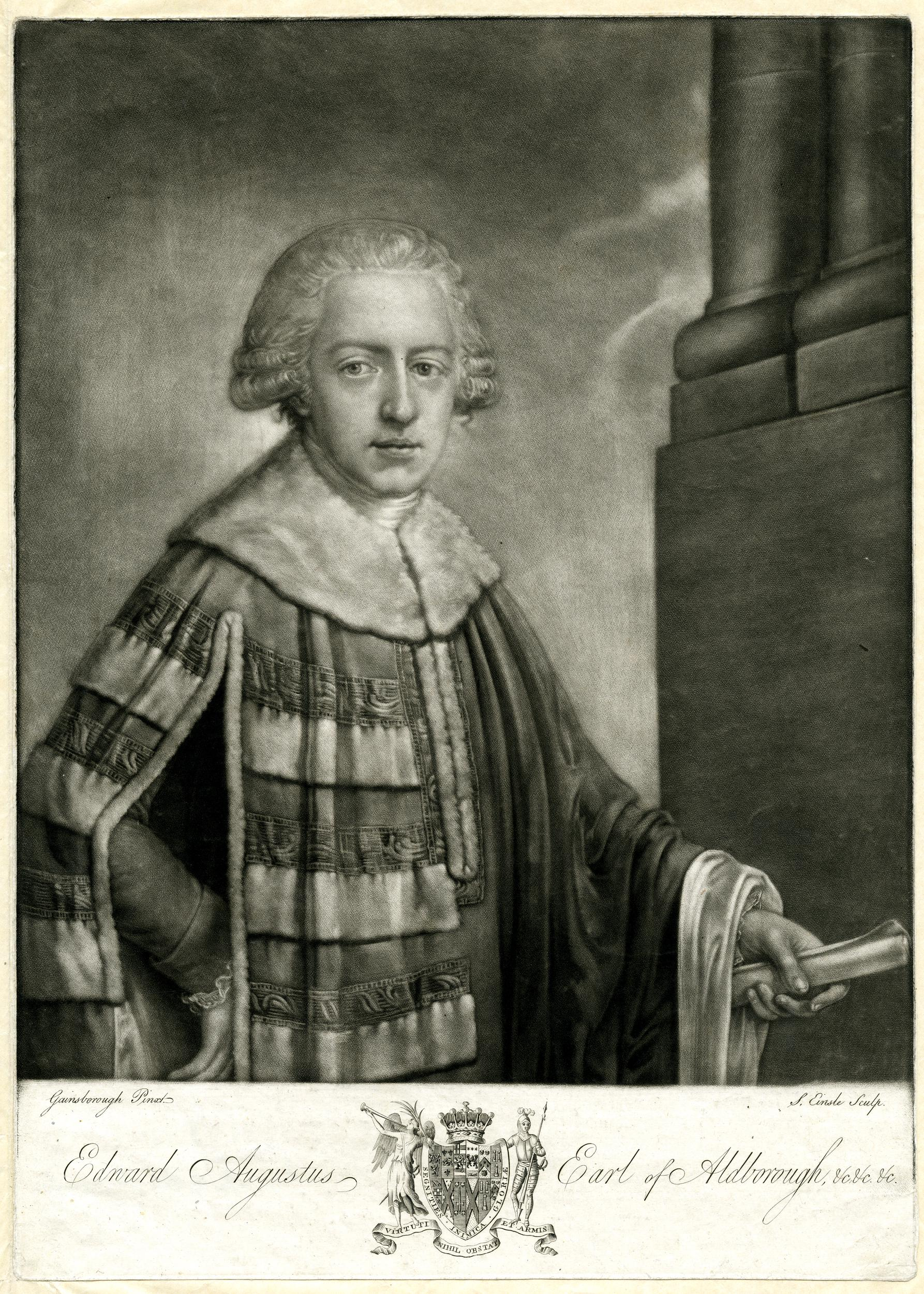
- mezzotint of a portrait by Thomas Gainsborough
- Born: 1734
- Died: 2 January 1801 (aged 66–67); Belan
- Alma mater: Trinity College Dublin
- Occupation: Politician
- Spouse(s): Barbara Herbert, Anne Elizabeth Henniker
- Parent(s): John Stratford, 1st Earl of Aldborough; Martha O'Neale
- Titles: Earl of Aldborough

Edward Augustus Stratford, 2nd Earl of Aldborough, FRS (1736 – 2 January 1801) of Belan house, styled The Honourable from 1763 to 1777 and Viscount Amiens in the latter year, was an Irish peer, Whig politician, and member of the Noble House of Stratford. He sat in the Irish House of Commons between 1759 and 1777 and in the British House of Commons from 1774 to 1775.

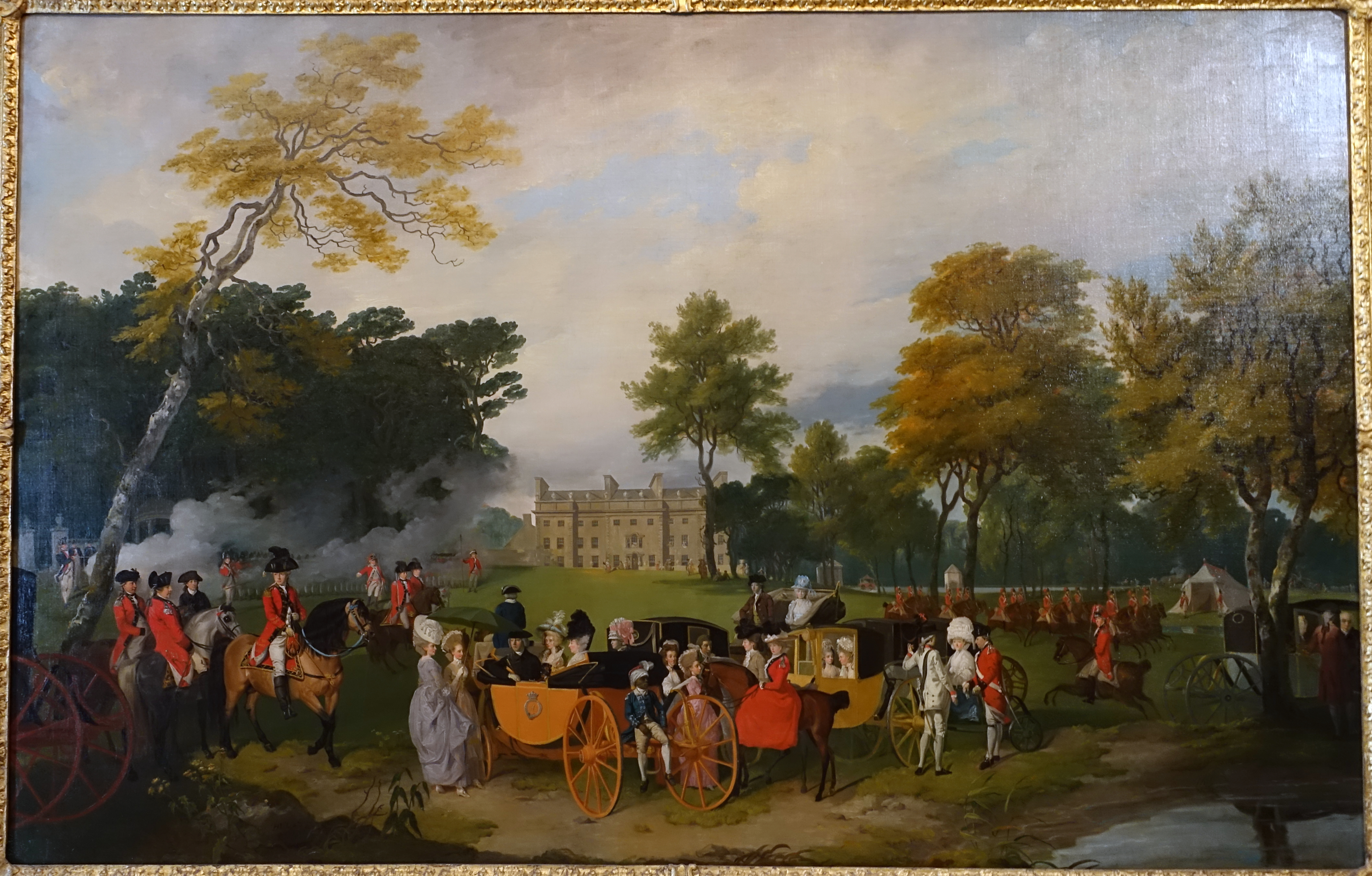
Belan house, seat of the Earls of Aldborough

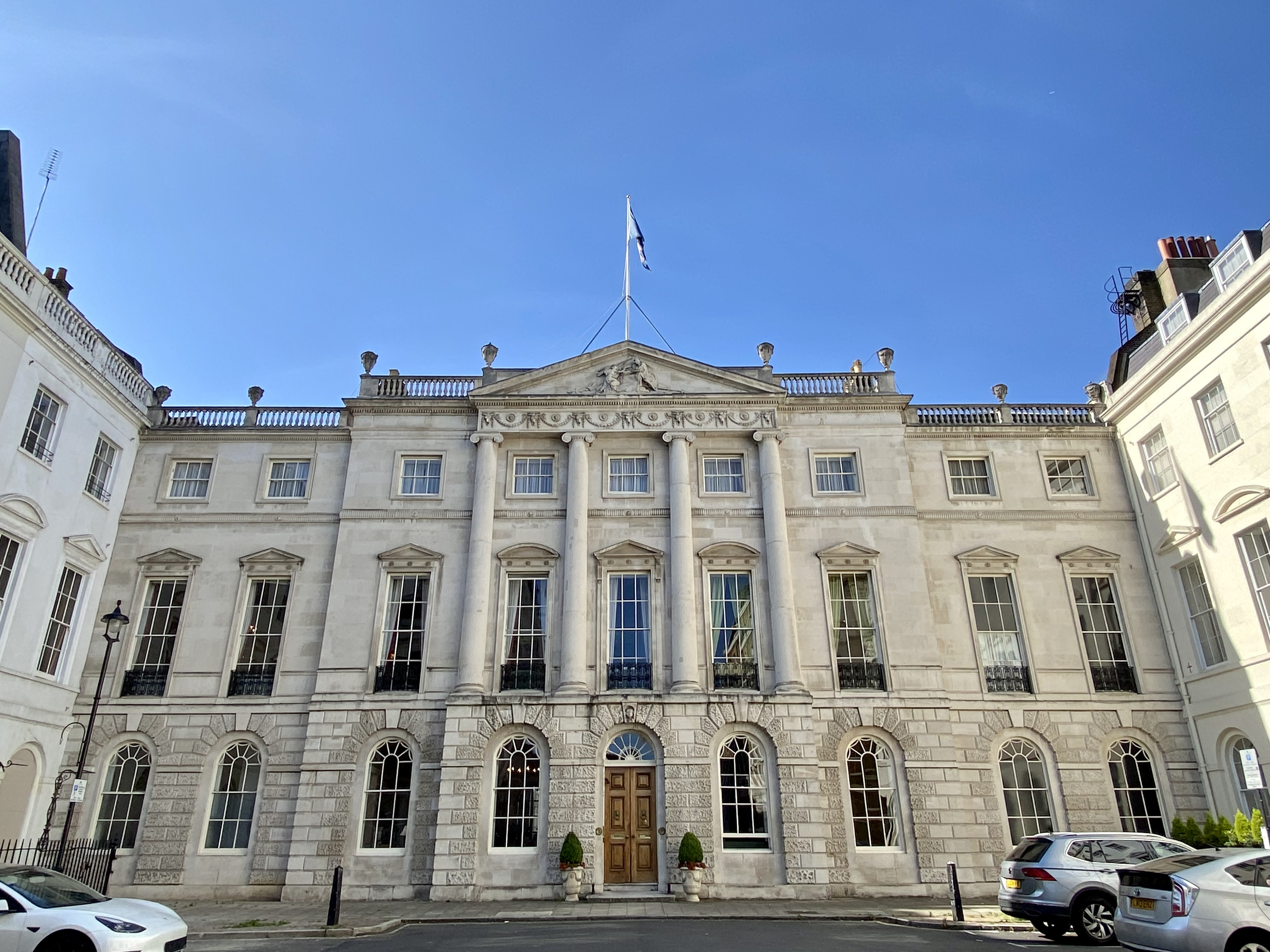
Stratford House, London

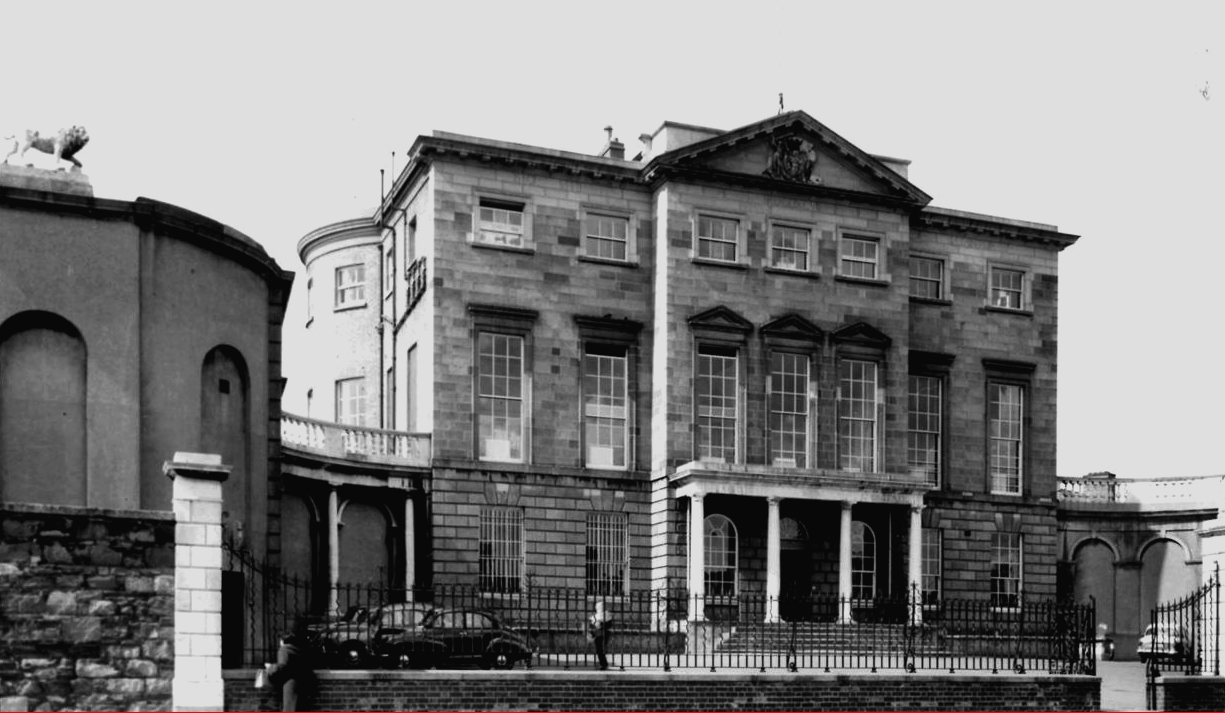
Aldborough House, Dublin

== Background ==
He was the oldest son of John Stratford, 1st Earl of Aldborough and his wife Martha O'Neale, daughter of Venerable Benjamin O'Neale, Archdeacon of Leighlin. A descendant of the English House of Stratford, his younger brother was Benjamin Stratford, 4th Earl of Aldborough. In 1777, Stratford succeeded his father as earl, and in the same year he was awarded a Doctor of Civil Laws by the University of Oxford. He built Stratford Place in London and Aldborough House in Dublin.

== Career ==
In 1759, he entered the Irish House of Commons for Baltinglass, the same constituency his father also represented, and sat for it until 1768. He was returned for Baltinglass again from 1775 to 1777. In 1774, he was elected to the British House of Commons for Taunton, however was unseated for accusations of bribery. Stratford was appointed a Fellow of the Royal Society in May 1777, and became Governor of County Wicklow the following year.

== Family ==
On 29 July 1765, he married, firstly, Barbara Herbert, daughter of Hon. Nicholas Herbert, a younger son of Thomas Herbert, 8th Earl of Pembroke, at St George's, Hanover Square. She died by an apoplexy in 1785, and Stratford married secondly Hon. Anne Elizabeth Henniker, only daughter of John Henniker, 1st Baron Henniker at Grosvenor Square on 24 May 1787. Stratford died at Belan House in County Kildare, childless, and was buried at St Thomas's Church, Dublin. He was succeeded in his titles by his younger brother John.

== Stratford House ==
Edward's London home, Stratford place, was built between 1770 and 1776. He paid £4,000 for the site. The central range of Stratford House was designed by Robert Adam and it had previously been the location of the Lord Mayor of London's Banqueting House, built in 1565. There have been several people of note who stayed there including the sons of the Tzar of Russia, and the wife of Sir Winston Churchill was born there, and the house until 1832 was owned by the Wingfield Stratford's who inherited it from Edward's Will. It belonged briefly to Grand Duke Nicholas Nikolaevich, a son of Tsar Nicholas I of Russia. The house was little altered until 1894, when its then owner, Mr Murray Guthrie, added a second storey to the east and west wings and a colonnade in front. In 1903, a new owner, the Liberal politician Sir Edward Colebrook, later Lord Colebrooke, reconstructed the Library to an Adam design. In 1908, Lord Derby bought a lease and began more alterations, removing the colonnade and adding a third storey to both wings. He took out the original bifurcated staircase (replacing it with a less elegant single one), demolished the stables and built a Banqueting Hall with a grand ballroom above.

In 1960 the house was purchased by the Oriental Club and converted to its present state. The ballroom was turned into two floors of new bedrooms, further lifts were added, and the banqueting hall was divided into a dining room and other rooms. The house now has a main drawing room, as well as others, a members' bar, a library and an ante-room, a billiards room, an internet suite and business room, and two (non-)smoking rooms, as well as a dining room and 32 bedrooms.

Stratford House is a Grade I listed building.

Parliament of Ireland
Preceded by John Stratford; Daniel Falkiner	Member of Parliament for Baltinglass; 1759–1768; With: John Stratford 1759–1763; Hon. John Stratford 1763–1768	Succeeded by Hon. John Stratford; Godfrey Lill
Preceded by Hon. John Stratford; Godfrey Lill	Member of Parliament for Baltinglass; 1775–1777; With: Hon. John Stratford	Succeeded by Hon. Benjamin Stratford; John Godley
Parliament of Great Britain
Preceded by Alexander Popham; Nathaniel Webb	Member of Parliament for Taunton; 1774–1775; With: Nathaniel Webb	Succeeded by John Halliday; Alexander Popham
Peerage of Ireland
Preceded by John Stratford	Earl of Aldborough; 1777–1801	Succeeded by John Stratford
