= Robert de Stratford =

Bishop of Chichester and Chancellor of England (c. 1292–1362)

- Bishop of Chichester
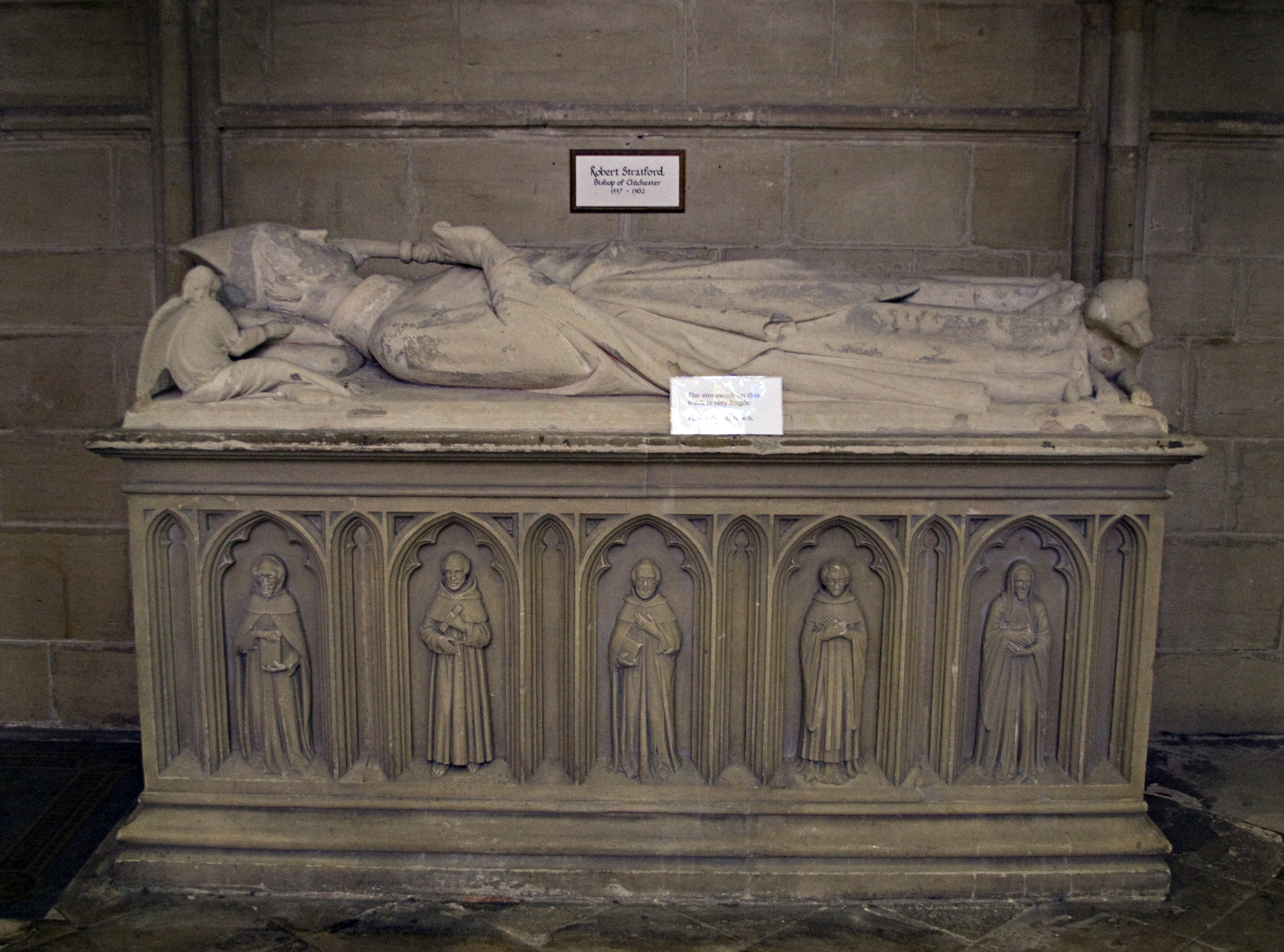
- Tomb of Robert de Stratford in Chichester Cathedral
- Elected: between 23 July and 18 August 1337
- Term ended: 9 April 1362
- Predecessor: John Langton
- Successor: William Lenn

Orders
- Consecration: 30 November 1337

Personal details
- Born: c. 1292 Warwickshire
- Died: 9 April 1362 (aged 69-70) Aldingbourne, Sussex
- Denomination: Catholic

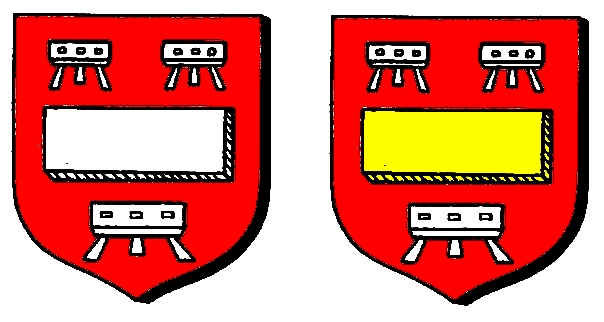
Coats of arms attributed to Robert de Stratford: a) a fess humette between three trestles, argent; b) a fess humette or, between three trestles, argent

Robert de Stratford (c. 1292 – 9 April 1362) was an English bishop and was one of Edward III's principal ministers.

== Early life ==
Stratford was born into the landed Stratford family of Stratford-on-Avon around 1292. His father was another Robert and his mother was called Isabel. He was brother to John de Stratford (Archbishop of Canterbury) and possibly Henry de Stratford and Thomas de Stratford, Archdeacon of Gloucester (he was certainly a relation to both), to the latter of whom he gifted the manor of Shottery. Robert senior has been identified as ‘Master’ Robert, co-founder and first master of the hospital of St Cross within the town, but in view of the title magister and the celibate status required, this appears unlikely. The family was related to the Hattons, important men in the town, Ralph Hatton ‘of Stratford’, the future bishop of London, being John's nephew. He was also a relative of Sir Andrew De Stratford.

== Career ==
Stratford served for a time as deputy to his brother John. From 1329 he served as Prebend of Aylesbury and then from 1331 to 1334 he served as Chancellor of the Exchequer and from March to July 1338 as Lord Chancellor. He was dismissed as chancellor in 1338 but regained the office for six months in 1340.

From 1335 to 1338, Stratford was Chancellor of the University of Oxford.

From 1334 to 1337, Stratford was Archdeacon of Canterbury. He was elected Bishop of Chichester between 23 July and 18 August 1337, and was consecrated 30 November 1337.

== Death ==
Stratford made his will and died at his manor of Aldingbourne in Sussex on 9 April 1362. Probate was granted on the 26th. His recumbent effigy lies in the south choir aisle of Chichester Cathedral.

== Citations ==
Political offices
Preceded by John de Stratford	Lord Chancellor; 1337–1338	Succeeded by Richard Bintworth
Preceded by John de Stratford	Lord Chancellor; 1340	Succeeded by Sir Robert Bourchier
Catholic Church titles
Preceded by Richard de Ferings	Archdeacon of Canterbury; 1334–1337	Succeeded by Simon Islip
Preceded by John Langton	Bishop of Chichester; 1337–1362	Succeeded by William Lenn
Academic offices
Preceded by Hugh de Willoughby	Chancellor of the University of Oxford; 1335–1338	Succeeded by Robert Paynink? or John Leech
