= John Stratford, 1st Earl of Aldborough =

Irish peer and politician

Arms of Stratford, Earl of Aldborough: Barry of ten argent and azure, a lion rampant gules

John Stratford, 1st Earl of Aldborough (1697/1698 – 29 May 1777) was an Irish peer and politician and member of the Noble House of Stratford.

== Background ==
John was born either on 10 August 1697, or in 1698 at Ormond. He was the third son of Edward Stratford a wealthy landowner, and his first wife Elizabeth Baisley, daughter of Euseby Baisley of Ricketstown, Rathvilly, County Carlow. His father quarrelled with his two elder sons and disinherited them, so that the estate passed to John. He was a descendant of the English House of Stratford. He matriculated at Trinity College, Dublin on 8 May 1716.

== Career ==
In 1721, he entered the Irish House of Commons for Baltinglass. He was said to have been a notably inactive MP, whose great ambition was to acquire a peerage. He was appointed High Sheriff of Wexford in 1727, High Sheriff of Wicklow in 1736 and High Sheriff of Wexford in 1739.

Stratford sat for Baltinglass until 21 May 1763, when he was raised to the Peerage of Ireland as Baron Baltinglass, of Baltinglass, in the County of Wicklow. On 22 July 1776, he was advanced to the dignity of Viscount Aldborough, of Belan, County Kildare or the Palatinate of Upper Ormond, part of a series of promotions carried out by Earl Harcourt, the Lord Lieutenant of Ireland, to secure support for the British ministry in the Parliament of Ireland. and on 9 February 1777, Stratford was further honoured when he became Viscount Amiens and Earl of Aldborough, of the Palatinate of Upper Ormond. The title of "Viscount Amiens" was apparently adapted on the strength of a fictitious pedigree detailing Stratford's descent from a companion of William the Conqueror originating in Amiens.

== Family ==
He married Martha O'Neale, daughter of Venerable Benjamin O'Neale, Archdeacon of Leighlin. They had six sons and nine daughters. In his old age, gouty and irritable, he quarrelled with most of his children. Stratford was succeeded in his titles successively by his oldest son Edward, his second son John and then his fourth son Benjamin. His daughter Martha married Morley Saunders, of the well-known family of Saunders Grove, County Wicklow, and had issue.

== Notes ==
Parliament of Ireland
Preceded by Jeffrey Paul; Edward Stratford	Member of Parliament for Baltinglass; 1721–1763; With: Edward Stratford 1721–1727; Daniel Falkiner 1727–1759; Edward Stratford 1759–1763	Succeeded by Hon. John Stratford; Hon. Edward Stratford
Peerage of Ireland
New creation	Earl of Aldborough; January–May 1777	Succeeded by Edward Stratford
New creation	Viscount Aldborough; 1776–1777	Succeeded by Edward Stratford
New creation	Baron Baltinglass; 1763–1777	Succeeded by Edward Stratford
