= House of Stratford =

Aristocratic family in Britain

Stratford
- Noble House
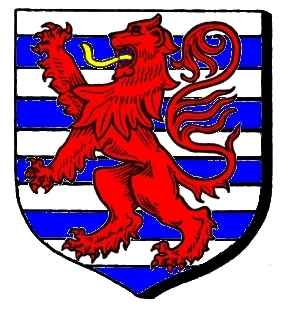
- Stratford coat of arms
- Parent house: possibly the House of Tosny
- Country: United Kingdom and Ireland
- Founded: 1245; 781 years ago
- Founder: Robert de Stratford
- Titles: Earl of Aldborough; Viscount Amiens; Baron Baltinglass; Viscount Stratford de Redcliffe; Dugdale Baronets
- Motto: Virtuti Nihil Obstat Et Armis (Nothing Withstands Valour and Arms)
- Cadet branches: Stratford of Farmcote; Stratford of Wessex; Stratford of Bushley; Streatfeild of Chiddingstone Castle; Stratford of Wythall; Stratford of Merevale; Stratford of Overstone; Stratford of Belan

The House of Stratford (/strætfərd/) is a British aristocratic family, originating in Stratford-on-Avon between the eleventh and thirteenth centuries. The family has produced multiple titles, including Earl of Aldborough, Viscount Amiens, Baron Baltinglass, Viscount Stratford de Redcliffe and the Dugdale Baronets. The Viscount Powerscourt and Baron Wrottesley both claim descent from this House. Historic seats have included Farmcote Manor and Stratford Park in Gloucester, Merevale Hall in Warwickshire, Baltinglass Castle, Belan and Aldborough House in Ireland, and Stratford House in London, amongst many others. The house was at its most powerful in the fourteenth, sixteenth, and eighteenth centuries.

== Origins ==
Though an 18th-century pedigree names the founder of the house as one Edvardus Stratford from an "illustrious Anglo-Saxon family" in the 9th century, and some researchers theorise the house descends from a cadet branch of the Norman House of Tosny which came to England with William the Conqueror, indisputable descent begins with Robert de Stratford, an original burgess of Stratford-on-Avon in the 1200s. His children and nephews rose to positions of significant power and influence in the political and religious landscape of England in the fourteenth century, and originated all other branches of the family.

The children and nephews of Robert de Stratford include:

- John de Stratford (c.1275 - 1348), Bishop of Winchester, Lord High Treasurer, Lord Chancellor, Archbishop of Canterbury
- Robert de Stratford (c.1292 – 9 April 1362), Chancellor of the Exchequer, Chancellor of the University of Oxford, Lord Chancellor, Archdeacon of Canterbury, Bishop of Chichester
- Thomas de Stratford, Dean of Gloucester
- Stephen de Stratford, progenitor of the Stratfords of Farmcote
- Henry de Stratford Greater Clerk of the Royal Chancery under Edward III
- Thomas de Stratford (died 12 June 1396) Senior Proctor of Oxford University, Archdeacon of Gloucester, Prior of Caldwell
- Ralph de Stratford (c. 1300-1354), also known as Ralph Hatton of Stratford, Bishop of London
- Andrew de Stratford (died 30 November 1378), landowner and verderer, progenitor of the Stratfords of Wessex

=== Stratfords of Farmcote ===
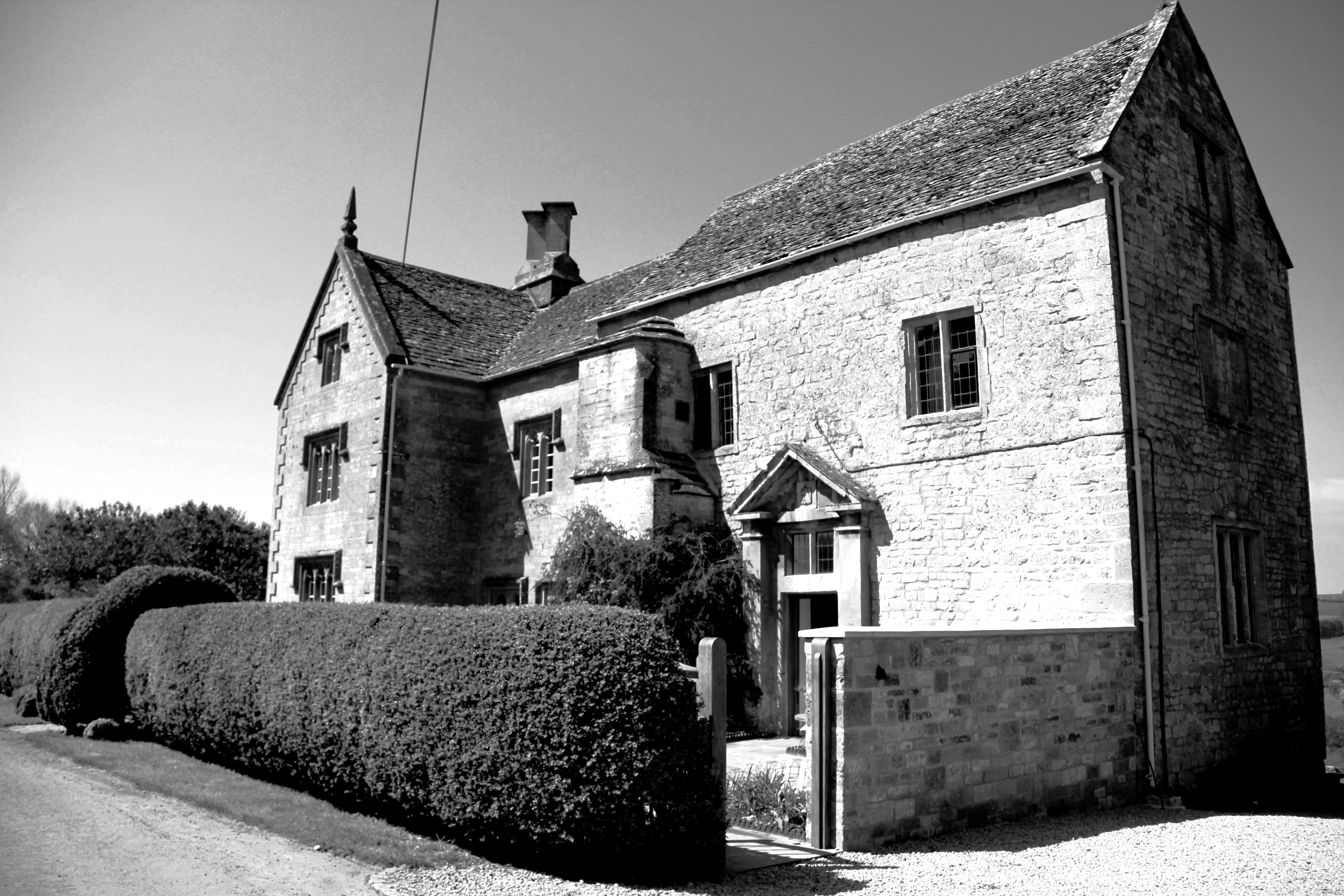
Great Farmcote Manor The feudal manor house of the Farmcote Estate, historically the seat of the Gloucestershire Stratfords

A cadet branch of Stratfords, founded by Stephen de Stratford, were granted Lordship of the Manors of Farmcote, Hawling and Temple Guiting in 1314. His son, John Stratford, in 1320 became a member of parliament for Gloucestershire, and his son was raised to the knighthood as Sir Stephen Stratford. Sir Stephen married Elizabeth Monthault, descendant of Eustace de Montaut, and all later cadet branches stem from this union. Following the dissolution of Hailes Abbey in 1539 this branch took Farmcote Manor House as their seat. This line were cousins to Robert Dover, and involved in the establishment of the Cotswold Olimpick Games in 1612.

The Farmcote and Hawling estates were sold in 1756, by sons of Walter Stratford, though part of Farmcote Manor still stands, and Stratford tombs, arms and effigies can be found in the estate chapel there.

Descendants of the Farmcote Stratfords were still recorded living in the areas of Hawling, Sevenhampton and Prestbury, Gloucestershire during the time from 1841 to 1900 census.

The Stratford family of Prestbury, Gloucestershire, were prominent regional landowners dating back to the Tudor and Stuart eras. Branching from the main Stratford line at Farmcote Manor, figures like "John of Prestbury" established deep roots in the village. John Stratford’s descendants remained prominent in the area through the 19th century.

Notable members of this line include:

- Stephen de Stratford, progenitor of the Stratfords of Farmcote, family of John de Stratford
- John Stratford, member of parliament for Gloucestershire, 1320
- Sir Stephen Stratford, knight of the realm
- Thomas de Stratford (died 12 June 1396) Senior Proctor of Oxford University, Archdeacon of Gloucester, Prior of Caldwell
- John Stratford (c.1582-c.1634) Merchant and entrepreneur, a significant grower of tobacco in the Cotswolds

=== Stratfords of Wessex ===
Andrew de Stratford, a nephew of John de Stratford and friend of William of Wykeham, moved to the Wessex area as part of his uncle's familia when he became Bishop of Winchester. Acquiring land in the New Forest, Hampshire, Wiltshire and Berkshire, Andrew married a certain Christine and founded a cadet branch of Stratfords, descendants of which remain in Hampshire, Wiltshire, and Berkshire to this day.

=== Stratfords of Merevale ===
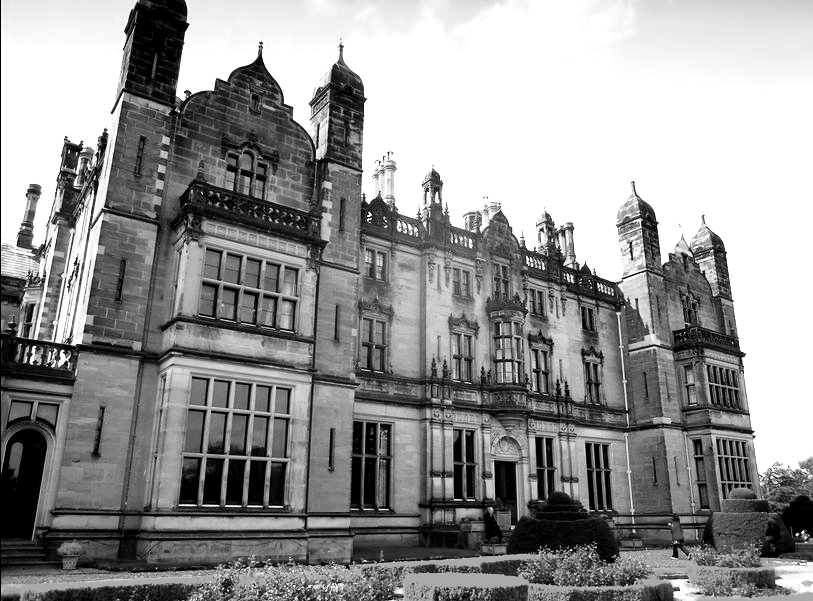
Merevale Hall, Warwickshire, now seat of the Dugdale Baronets.

The Manor of Merevale in north Warwickshire (including the original Merevale Hall and estate) was purchased in the mid-seventeenth century by Edward Stratford (died 1665), 9x great grandson of Sir Stephen de Stratford of Farmcote. In 1749 the property was inherited by Penelope Bate Stratford (the daughter and co-heiress of Francis Stratford of Merevale) who married into the (now) Dugdale baronets, who still possess the estate.

==== Stratford Dugdales and Dugdale baronets ====
In 1749 Merevale Hall was inherited by Edward's eventual descendant Penelope Bate Stratford (the daughter and co-heiress of Francis Stratford of Merevale) who married William Geast. William Geast took the surname of his Uncle, John Dugdale, and their child was Dugdale Stratford Dugdale who married the honourable Charlotte Curzon, daughter of Assheton Curzon, 1st Viscount Curzon of the (now) Earls Howe. Their son William Stratford Dugdale had a son also named William Stratford Dugdale who had a son named William Francis Stratford Dugdale, who came to be the 1st Baronet. The Merevale estate has descended to the present incumbent, his grandson Sir William Matthew Stratford Dugdale, 3rd Bt of the Dugdale baronets thus:

- Sir William Francis Stratford Dugdale, 1st Baronet (1872-1965)
- Sir William Stratford Dugdale, 2nd Baronet (1922-2014)
- Sir William Matthew Stratford Dugdale, 3rd Baronet, (born 22 February 1959); the only male issue of the 2nd Baronet's first marriage
- Thomas Joshua Stratford Dugdale FRSA (born 1974), British documentary film-maker, male issue of the 2nd Baronet's second marriage
- Eric Stratford Dugdale, (born 18 May 2001), heir apparent to the baronetcy, son of Sir William Stratford Dugdale, 3rd Baronet

== Earls of Aldborough ==
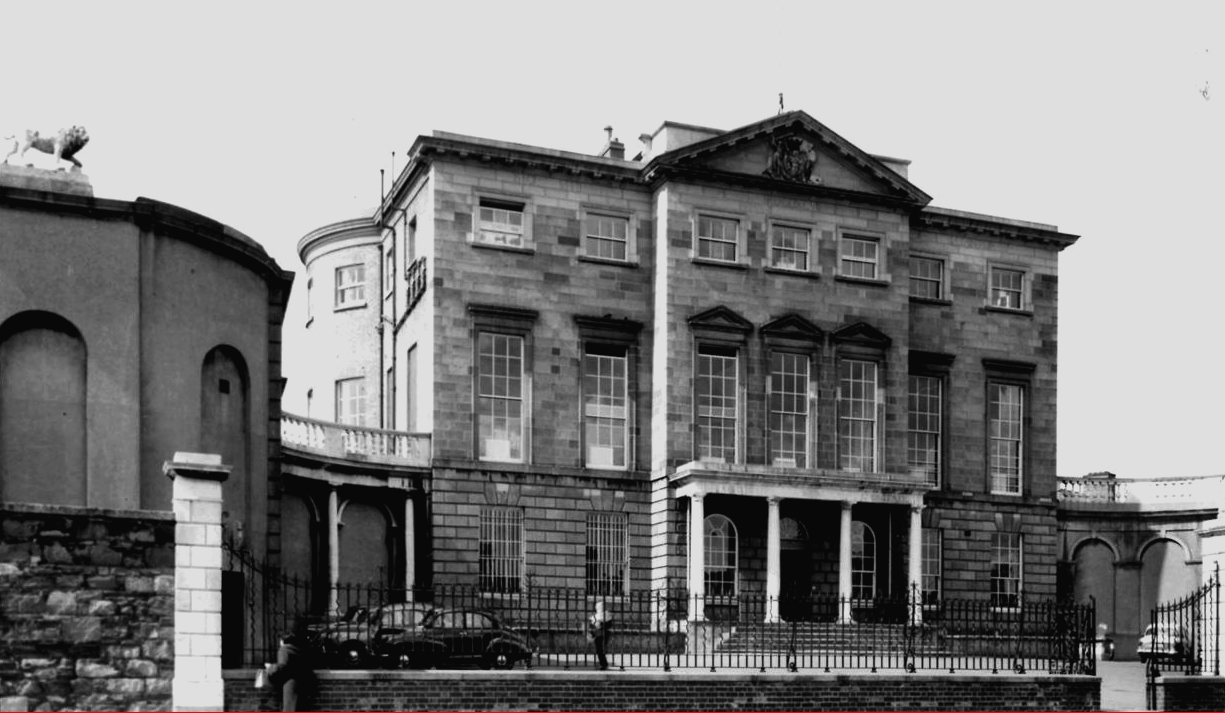
Aldborough House, Dublin Built by Edward Augustus Stratford (1736-1801), 2nd Earl of Aldborough between 1792 and 1798

Edward Stratford of Merevale Hall settled the sum of £500 on his younger brother Robert Stratford to establish a line in Ireland. Robert settled at Baltinglass Castle, and his grandson entered the peerage as Earls of Aldborough, of the Palatinate of Upper Ormond. The title was created on 9 February 1777, along with the subsidiary title Viscount Amiens, for John Stratford, 1st Viscount Aldborough. He had already been created Baron Baltinglass, of Baltinglass, in the County of Wicklow, on 21 May 1763, and Viscount Aldborough, of the Palatinate of Upper Ormond, on 22 July 1776. These titles were also in the Peerage of Ireland. Three of his sons, the second, third and fourth Earls, all succeeded in the titles. They became extinct on the death of the latter's grandson, the sixth Earl, in 1875. Their seats were Belan House, Aldborough House, Baltinglass Castle and Stratford House. and went on to sire the Earls of Aldborough.

Notable Stratfords of Baltinglass include:

- Robert Stratford (of the Merevale Stratfords)
- Edward Stratford, supporter of William of Orange, refused a peerage offered by William III
- John Stratford, 1st Earl of Aldborough (c. 1691–1777)
- Edward Stratford, 2nd Earl of Aldborough (died 1801)
- John Stratford, 3rd Earl of Aldborough (c. 1740–1823)
- Benjamin O'Neale Stratford, 4th Earl of Aldborough (died 1833)
- Mason Gerard Stratford, 5th Earl of Aldborough (1784–1849) (Bigamist)
- Captain Benjamin O'Neale Stratford, 6th Earl of Aldborough (1808–1875)

=== Stratford Cannings and Viscount Stratford de Redcliffe ===
Abigail Stratford was the daughter of Robert Stratford, progenitor of the Irish Stratfords. In 1697 she married George Canning, and in 1703 they had a son, named Stratford Canning. He had a son sometime after 1734, also named Stratford Canning, who had a son in 1786, also named Stratford Canning, who was created 1st Viscount Stratford de Redcliffe on 24 April 1852.

- Stratford Canning, 1st Viscount Stratford de Redcliffe KG GCB PC (1786–1880), a diplomat and politician, best known as the longtime British Ambassador to the Ottoman Empire

=== Wingfield-Stratfords, Viscount Powerscourt, and Baron Wrottesley ===
Lady Amelia Stratford was the daughter of John Stratford, 1st Earl of Aldborough. On 7 September 1760 she married Richard Wingfield, 3rd Viscount Powerscourt, and took his name; it is from this maternal Stratford lineage that the current Viscount Powerscourt descends.

The Stratford descendant Viscounts Powerscourt are as follows:

- Richard Wingfield, 4th Viscount Powerscourt (1762–1809)
- Richard Wingfield, 5th Viscount Powerscourt (1790–1823)
- Richard Wingfield, 6th Viscount Powerscourt (1815–1844)
- Mervyn Wingfield, 7th Viscount Powerscourt (1836–1904)
- Mervyn Richard Wingfield, 8th Viscount Powerscourt (1880–1947)
- Mervyn Patrick Wingfield, 9th Viscount Powerscourt (1905–1973)
- Mervyn Niall Wingfield, 10th Viscount Powerscourt (1935-2015)
- Mervyn Anthony Wingfield, 11th Viscount Powerscourt (born 1963)
- The heir presumptive to the viscountcy is a kinsman of the current holder, also a Stratford descendant: Richard David Noel Wingfield (born 1966), a great-great-great-grandson of the Rev. Hon. Edward Wingfield (1792-1874), the third son of the fourth Viscount. He has a son, Dylan.

When Edward Stratford, 2nd Earl of Aldborough (Amelia's brother) died in 1801 he bequeathed the bulk of his estate to Amelia's grandson (his nephew, too junior to inherit the Powerscourt Viscountcy) on the proviso that he took back the Stratford name, thus becoming John Wingfield-Stratford in 1802. This line inherited Stratford House in London, and Amelia lived there until her death in 1831. It was sold in 1832.

Notable Wingfield-Stratfords include:

- Brigadier-General Cecil Wingfield-Stratford CB, CMG (1853–1939) a British Army officer in the Royal Engineers and an English international footballer
- Captain Esmé Cecil Wingfield-Stratford DSC (1882–1971) an English historian, writer, mind-trainer, outdoorsman, patriot and ruralist

Esmé Cecil's daughter (Roshnara) married Richard John Wrottesley, 5th Baron Wrottesley, and though they later divorced it was through issue of their marriage that the Barony descended:

- Clifton Hugh Lancelot de Verdon Wrottesley, 6th Baron Wrottesley (born 1968), great-grandson of Esmé Cecil Wingfield-Stratford
- The heir apparent is the present holder's eldest son the Hon. Victor Wrottesley

== Stratford coats of arms ==
There are two main variant coats of arms associated with the Stratford family, Type A (or "trinity") and Type B (or "lion"). Type A can be further divided into the "Trestle" and "Roundel" subtypes.

=== Type A (trinity) ===
The Type A (or "trinity") Stratford Coat of Arms is the oldest of the two, first associated with John de Stratford and his familia in the early 1300s. It can be divided into two broad subtypes; Trestle, and Roundel.

==== Trestle ====
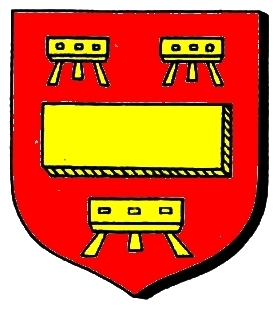
Gules, a fess humette between three trestles, or

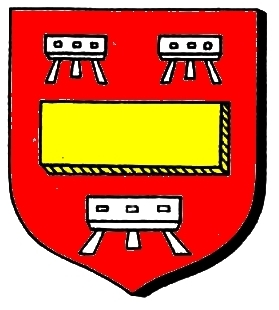
Gules, a fess humette or, between three trestles, argent

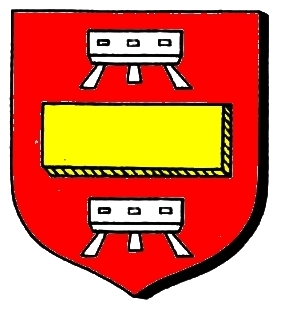
Gules, a fess humette or, between two trestles, argent

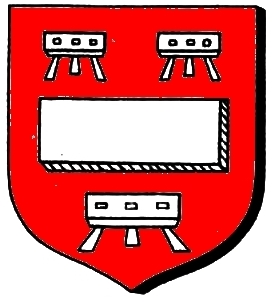
Gules, a fess humette between three trestles, argent

The Trestle type is most closely associated with the original Warwickshire Bishops, the Hampshire Stratfords descended from Andrew Stratford, and with Nicholas Stratford. The design is consistently based around gules, a fess humette, surrounded by three trestles argent (sometimes or). Variants include colour of fess and trestles, and number of trestles.

In heraldry the trestle (also tressle, tressel and threstle) as a charge is extremely rare, and known for symbolising hospitality (as historically the trestle was a tripod used both as a stool and a table support). The fess humette is apparently intended to represent a banqueting table, with the trestles gathered around.

==== Roundel ====
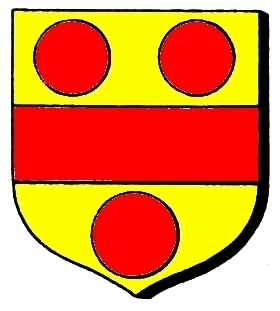
Or, a fess gules, between three torteaux

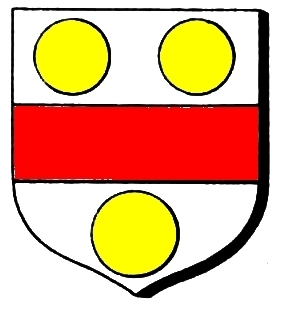
Argent, a fess gules, between three bezants

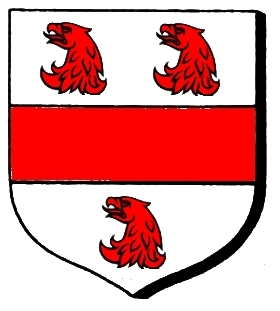
Irish
Argent, a fess between three hawks heads erased, gules

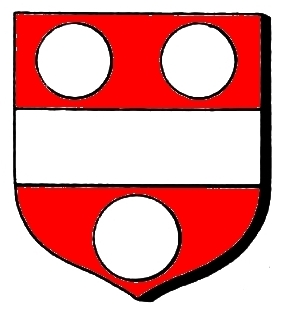
Gules, a fess argent, between three plates

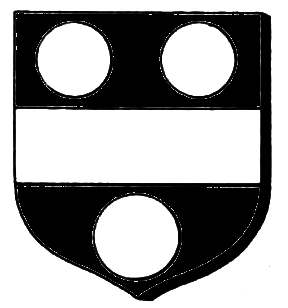
Sable, a fess argent, between three plates

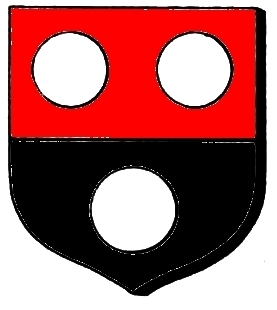
Per fess gules and sable, three plates

The Roundel type is associated solely with the medieval Bishops, and appears to be an archaic, simplified or corrupted version of the Trestle type. The design is consistently based around a fess, surrounded by three roundels. Variants include colour of fess, field and rondel.

A single example of a variant Roundel type surviving is in the later Irish recording of a shield in the name of Stratford: argent, a fess between three hawks heads erased, gules.

===== Streatfield =====
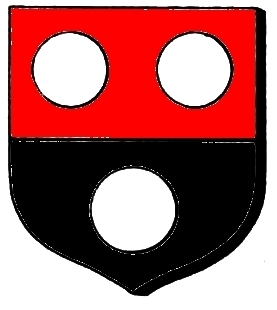
Stratford
Per fess gules and sable, three plates

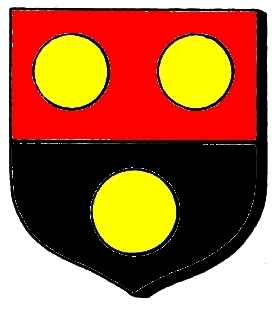
Streatfield
Per fess gules and sable, three bezants

The arms of the Streatfield (or Streatfeild) family, recorded in the sixteenth century, bear a striking resemblance to an attributed form of Stratford arms. This could be seen as evidence that the Streatfields, though their line cannot be traced beyond the 1500s, are in fact a branch of the Stratford family, the name having been corrupted at some point prior to the sixteenth century.

=== Type B (lion) ===
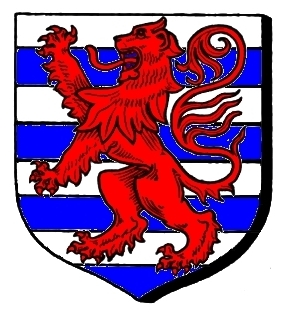
Barruly of eight, argent and azure, a lion rampant gules

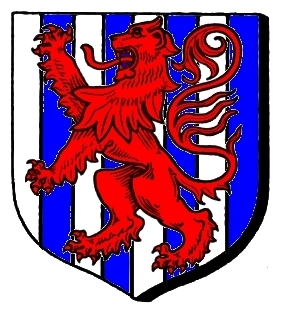
Paly of eight, argent and azure, a lion rampant gules

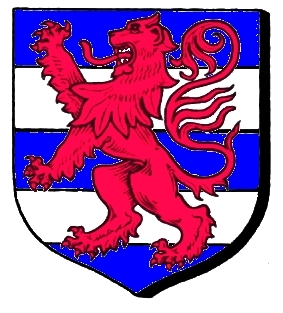
Barruly of five, azure and argent, a lion rampant ruby

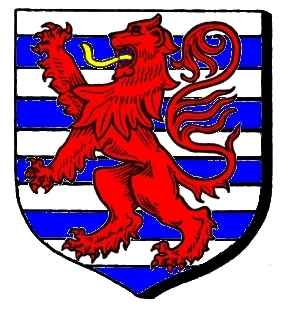
Barruly of ten, argent and azure, a lion rampant gules, langued or

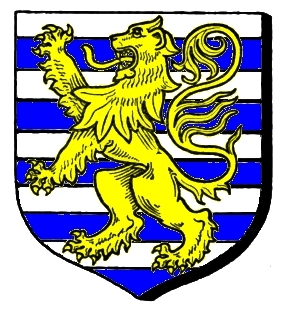
Barruly of ten, argent and azure, a lion rampant, or

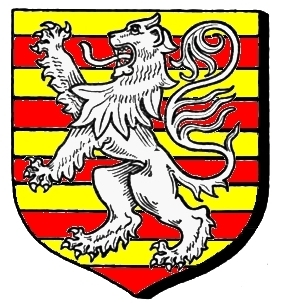
Barruly of ten, or and gules, a lion rampant, argent

The Type B Stratford Coat of Arms was first recorded by the Heralds Visitations to Gloucester of 1543, and since has been consistently based around a lion rampant, gules, on a barruly of ten, Argent and Azure. It is associated with the Gloucester, Merevale and Irish branches. Variations have included the addition of a crescent to denote a younger son, a change in the barruly number, change in langue colour, and in lion colour.

The Earls of Aldborough took supporters of human figures, a winged woman and armoured man, representing Fame and War. Officially: Dexter a Female figure, representing Fame, vested Ar, winged Or, in her right hand a trumpet gold, and in her left hand an olive branch vert, the sword belt Gules. Sinister, a man in complete armour Proper, garnished Or, spurs, sword, shield and spear of the last, sword belt Gules, holding in his right hand the spear, and upon his left arm the shield.

They also adopted the motto "Virtuti Nihil Obstat Et Armis" (Nothing Resists Valour and Arms).

==== Luxembourg and Lusignan ====
The Lusignan Coat of Arms, granted twelfth century

The Luxembourg Coat of Arms after 1288

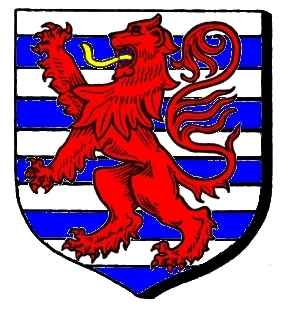
The Stratford Type B Coat of Arms, first recorded 1543

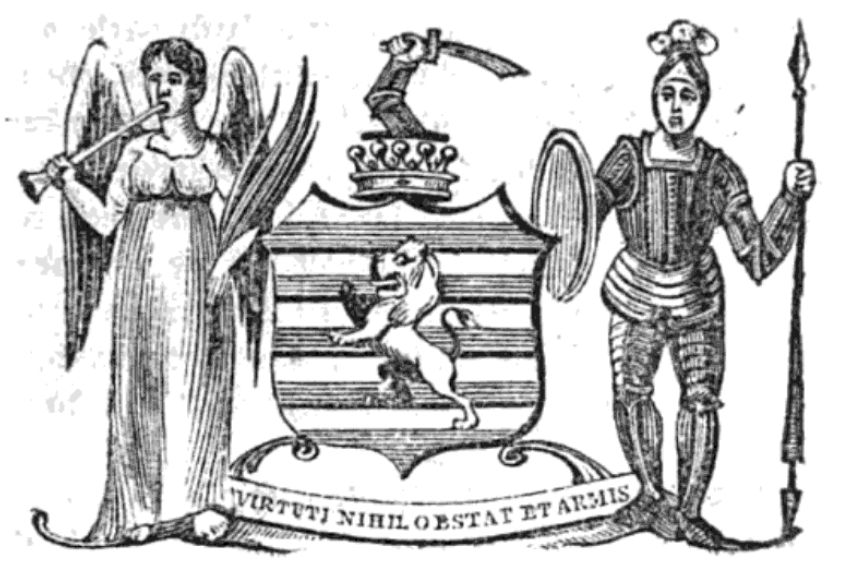
The Aldborough Arms, with Supporters (eighteenth century)

The Stratford Type B Coat of Arms is remarkably similar to two other prominent Coats of Arms, an extremely unorthodox occurrence. The exact relationship to the arms of Luxembourg and of Lusignan are unknown, if indeed any exists at all. Both bear (with some variation in number) a barruly of ten Argent and Azure, and both have a lion rampant gules - though often on these royal arms it is granted a crown (or), and the lion of Luxembourg bears a forked tail as difference. The similarity is too close to be dismissed satisfactorily as independent coincidence, and historians have generated various theories as to the connection between the houses and the arms, none conclusive.
