= Ralph Stratford =

Bishop of London (c. 1300–1354)

- Bishop of London
- Elected: 26 January 1340
- Term ended: 17 April 1354
- Predecessor: Richard de Wentworth
- Successor: Michael Northburgh

Orders
- Consecration: 12 March 1340

Personal details
- Born: c. 1300 Warwickshire
- Died: 7 or 17 April 1354 Stepney, London
- Denomination: Catholic

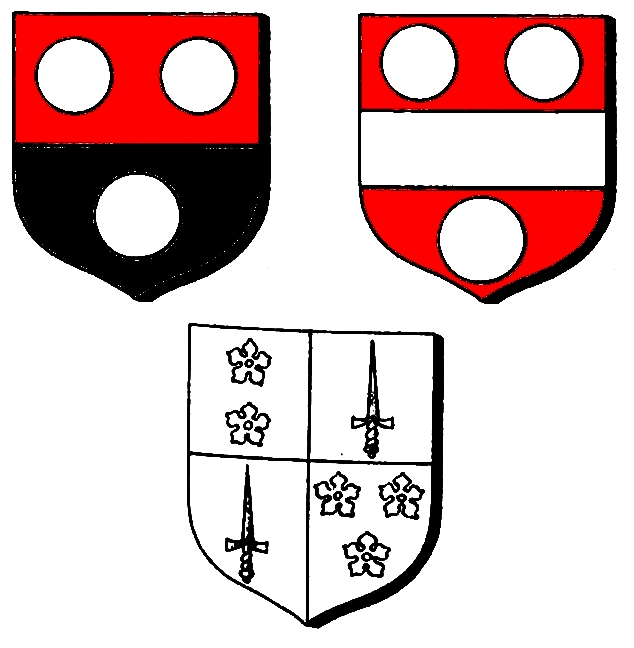
Coats of arms attributed to Ralph de Stratford: a) Per fess gules and sable, three plates; b) Gules, a fess argent, between three plates; c) Two cinquefoils pierced; quartering, 2 and 3, a sword in pale, point towards chief; 4, three cinquefoils

Ralph Stratford (c. 1300–1354), also known as Ralph Hatton of Stratford, was a medieval Bishop of London.

== Early life ==
Born in Stratford-on-Avon at the beginning of the fourteenth century, Stratford's parents may have been Thomas Hatton (of Warwickshire) and a sister of the bishops John de Stratford and Robert Stratford. He is also related, through them, to Henry de Stratford, Sir Andrew de Stratford and the Archdeacon Thomas de Stratford. He attended Oxford University and was regent MA in 1329.

== Career ==
Stratford's career was closely defined by and linked with his uncles John and Robert. He was elected 26 January 1340 and consecrated on 12 March 1340. In 1350 the king nominated him for the cardinalate.

== Death ==
Stratford died at Stepney, on 7 or 17 April 1354, and on 28 April his uncle Robert Stratford, bishop of Chichester, granted forty days' indulgence to those who prayed for his soul. He was buried in St Paul's Cathedral.

== Citations ==
Catholic Church titles
Preceded by Richard de Wentworth	Bishop of London; 1340–1354	Succeeded by Michael Northburgh
