= John de Stratford =

English clergyman and official (c.1275–1348)

- Archbishop of Canterbury; Primate of All England
- Church: Catholic Church
- Appointed: 3 November 1333
- Term ended: 23 August 1348
- Predecessor: Simon Mepeham
- Successor: John de Ufford
- Other posts: Chancellor of England (1330–34, 1335–37, 1340)
- Previous posts: Bishop of Winchester (1323–33); Treasurer (1326–27)

Personal details
- Born: c. 1275 Stratford-on-Avon, Warwickshire, England
- Died: 23 August 1348 Mayfield, Sussex, England
- Buried: Canterbury Cathedral
- Parents: Robert Stratford (father); Isabel Stratford (mother)

Ordination history
History
Episcopal consecration
- Consecrated by: Vital du Four
- Date: 26 June 1323
Episcopal succession
Bishops consecrated by John de Stratford as principal consecrator
- Richard Aungerville: 1333
- Robert Stratford: 1337
- Ralph Stratford: 1340
- Thomas Hatfield: 1345
- William Edendon: 1346
- John Thoresby: 1347
- John Gynwell: 1347

John de Stratford (c. 1275 – 1348) was Archbishop of Canterbury, Bishop of Winchester, Treasurer and Chancellor of England.

== Early life ==
Stratford was born into the landed Stratford family of Stratford-on-Avon around 1275. His father was Robert de Stratford (not to be confused with John's brother, Robert Stratford) and his mother was named Isabel. Robert senior has been identified as ‘Master’ Robert, co-founder and first master of the hospital of St Cross within the town, but in view of the title magister and the celibate status required, this appears unlikely. The family was related to the Hattons, important men in the town, Ralph Hatton ‘of Stratford’, the future bishop of London, being John's nephew. He was a relative of Andrew De Stratford and of Thomas de Stratford and Henry de Stratford (whom he inducted as the rector of a vacant church in North Berkhamstead (Lincoln) on 16 February 1325). Nothing definite is known of Stratford's schooling though it is likely that he attended the school belonging to the Guild of the Holy Cross, which became King Edward VI School. He studied at Oxford (not at Merton College, as claimed by the 17th Century antiquarian Anthony Wood, but probably Baliol, whom he remembered in his will), and by 1312 he was entitled doctor of civil law. He entered the service of Worcester Priory, but initially his beneficial progress was slow. However, by 1317 he was rector of Holy Trinity, Stratford, and acting as official of Bishop John Dalderby of Lincoln (d. 1320), whose executor he became. From Lincoln he migrated to Canterbury, and the service of Archbishop Walter Reynolds (d. 1327). He was dean of the court of arches in the early 1320s, by which time he held a useful portfolio of benefices, including canonries at Lichfield, Lincoln, and York, as well as the archdeaconry of Lincoln.

== Career ==
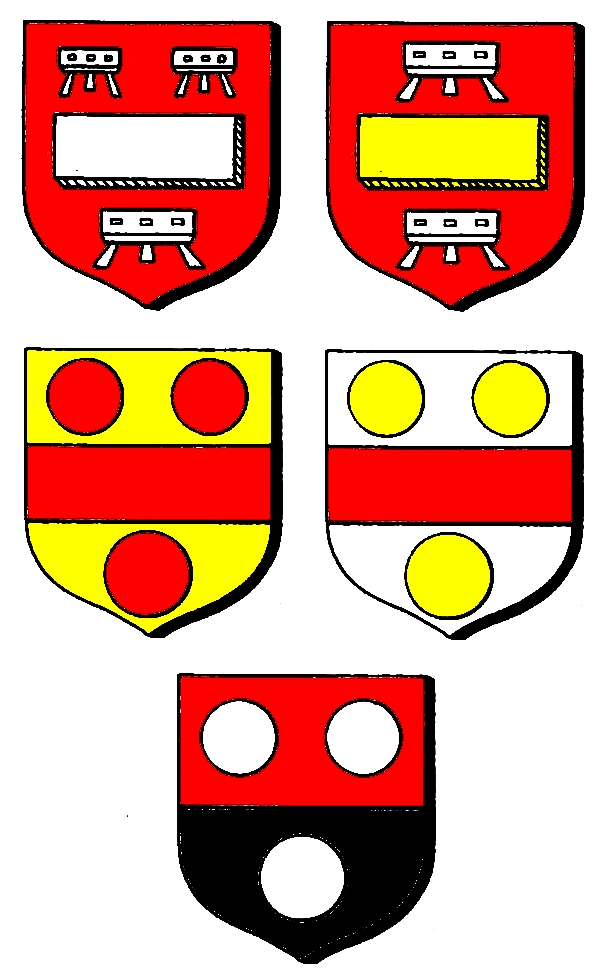
Coats of arms attributed to John de Stratford

Stratford served as archdeacon of Lincoln, canon of York and dean of the court of arches before 20 June 1323, when he became Bishop of Winchester, an appointment which was made during his visit to Pope John XXII at Avignon and which was very much disliked by Edward II. In 1327 the bishop joined Queen Isabella's partisans; he drew up the six articles against Edward II, and was one of those who visited the captive king at Kenilworth to urge him to abdicate in favour of his son. On 26 November 1326 he was appointed Lord Treasurer of England, a post he held until 28 January 1327.

Under Edward III, John de Stratford (Bishop of Winchester) became a member of the royal council from its inception in February 1327. Stratford is often regarded as the main clerical ally of the party of Earl Henry of Lancaster inside the council. Together with Thomas Wake, Stratford helped organize the London petition of grievances (27 September 1328) against the government of Mortimer & Isabella.

His high political importance dates from the autumn of 1330, the time when Roger Mortimer lost his power. Edward III appointed Stratford as his new chancellor on 28 November, 1330. For the next ten years Stratford was actively engaged in public business, being the king's most prominent adviser and being politically, says Stubbs, the "head of the Lancastrian or constitutional party."

In 1329 and 1332 he was involved in the case of Christina Carpenter who was an anchoress in a cell in Shere in Kent. She escaped from her cell and asked to be readmitted so she could die as a recluse.

On 3 November 1333 Stratford was appointed Archbishop of Canterbury and he resigned the chancellorship in the following year (28 September, 1334). However, Stratford held the office of chancellor again for two years (from 6 June, 1335 to 24 March, 1337), when he was succeeded by his younger brother Robert de Stratford (then archdeacon of Canterbury), who had already acted frequently as locum tenens during his brother's absences. The elder Stratford was appointed for a third time as chancellor on 28 April, 1340, serving for about two months before resigning because of ill health. He was succeeded again by his younger brother Robert (now Bishop of Chichester) on 20 June, 1340.

In November 1340 Edward III, humiliated, impecunious and angry, returned suddenly to England from Flanders and vented his wrath upon the archbishop's brother, the chancellor, Robert de Stratford, as well as briefly imprisoning Henry de Stratford. Fearing arrest the archbishop fled to Canterbury, and entered upon a violent war of words with the king, and by his firm conduct led to the establishment of the principle that peers were only to be tried in full parliament before their own order (en pleyn parlement et devant les piers). But good relations were soon restored between the two, and the archbishop acted as president of the council during Edward's absence from England in 1345 and 1346, although he never regained his former position of influence.

== Later life and death ==
Though Stratford's political career was by now largely over, between 1342 and his death he continued to exert influence as an elder statesman, even being dubbed dux regis by Dene. In June 1348 he fell ill at Maidstone. He died on 23 August at his manor of Mayfield, Sussex, according to ‘Birchington’ in an aura of sanctity, and was buried in his cathedral on 9 September where his alabaster effigy, somewhat damaged, lies on a fine canopied tomb, in a prominent position on the south side of the choir next to Prior Eastry's screen, as he had requested in his will.

== Legacy ==
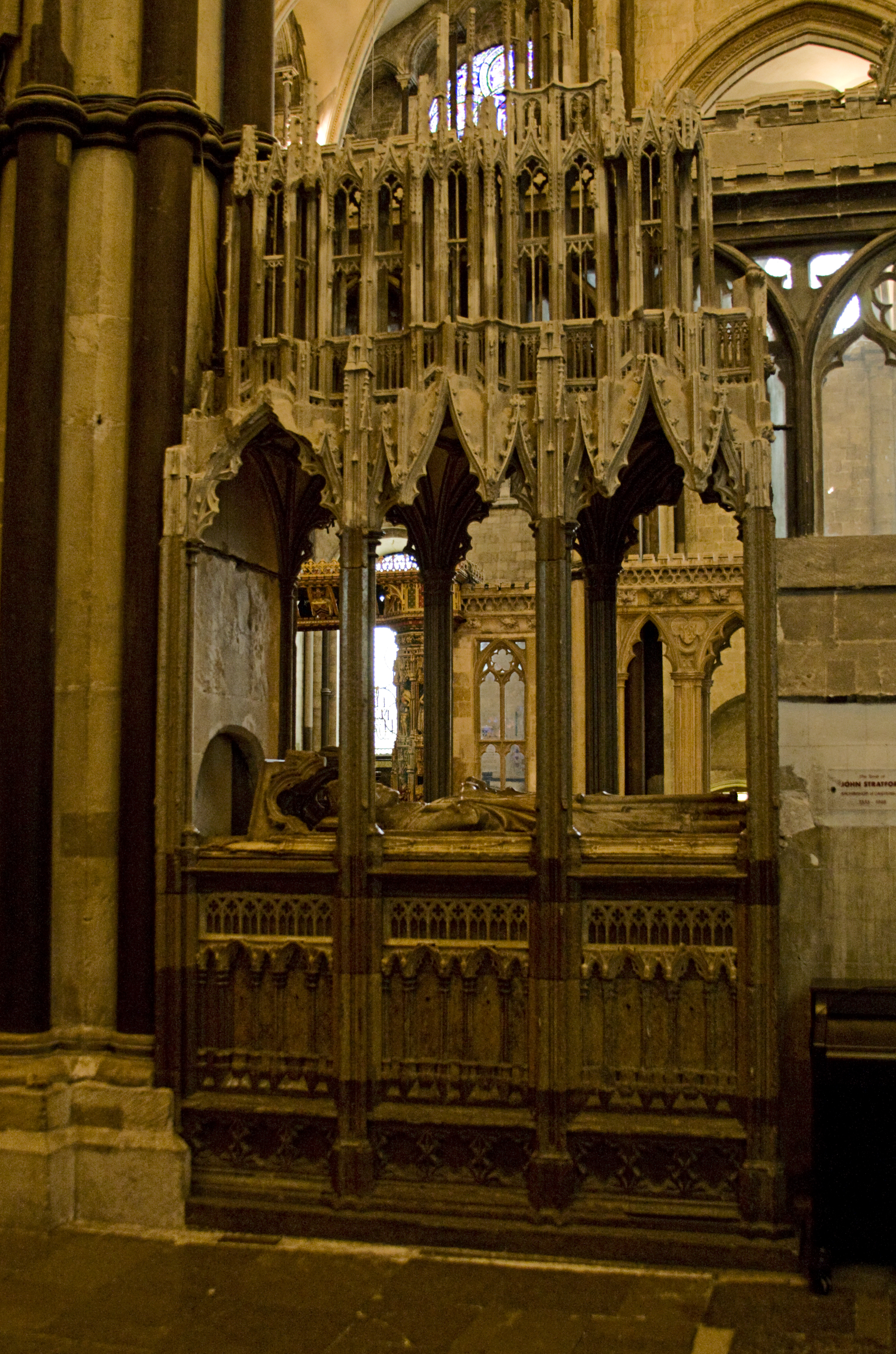
Tomb of Stratford in Canterbury Cathedral

Stratford's Canterbury register has not survived, but a large number of his acta can be gleaned from other sources. He was a notable legislator, drawing up detailed ordinances for the conduct of the court of Canterbury in 1342, while three sets of provincial constitutions, issued between 1341 and 1343, are attributed to him. The first set was clearly a draft, the second is particularly concerned with ecclesiastical administration and discipline, while the third was designed to preserve church liberties and deals with areas of friction between laymen and ecclesiastics. He was a notable benefactor to the hospital of St Thomas the Martyr at Canterbury, known as Eastbridge Hospital, but his efforts were principally directed towards his native Stratford, where he founded a chantry college with the same dedication. The initial foundation (1331) was for a warden, sub-warden, and three priests, but in 1336 an augmentation allowed for a further eight priests, though whether the full complement was ever achieved is uncertain. He secured the appropriation of the parish church to the foundation and a papal bull of confirmation was issued in 1345.

Opinion is divided as to Stratford's character, intentions, and stature. He has been compared unfavourably with his predecessors John Pecham (d. 1292) and Robert Winchelsey (d. 1313), but it was partly due to his moderation and legal training that the change of monarch was accomplished so smoothly in 1326–7. He certainly had a concern for what have been called ‘Lancastrian’ principles, in particular the importance of parliament. During the regime of Isabella and Mortimer he hazarded his career, perhaps his life, to maintain them. Without question he was a staunch defender of the liberties of the English church. The fourth of the statutes of 1340, conceded by Edward III under constraint of circumstances, he circulated triumphantly as a ‘charter of liberties’. His clerical petitions of May 1341 were incorporated in modified form into statutes of that date, which were summarily revoked by the king a few months later as contrary to English law and his own prerogative. That he was ambitious is self-evident, but it would be indefensible to argue that he had no underlying convictions. Although he had laboured long in the cause of peace, by 1337 he was forced to accept the inevitability of war with France, though not at the price of oppression at home. Even then he was not prepared to organize opposition to Edward III, doubtless because he had no desire to renew the civil strife of the previous reign. He may have been guilty of pride (superbia), as the frustrated king alleged, but he was not a foolish man. His reasoned defence in 1340–41 taught Edward a lesson he had the good sense never to forget.

== See also ==
- Thomas de Baumburgh – English clerk of the chancery and keeper of the great seal (fl. 1332)

== Citations ==
Political offices
Preceded by William Melton	Lord High Treasurer; 1326–1327	Succeeded by Adam Orleton
Preceded by Henry Burghersh	Lord Chancellor; 1330–1334	Succeeded by Richard Bury
Preceded by Richard Bury	Lord Chancellor; 1335–1337	Succeeded by Robert de Stratford
Preceded by Richard Bintworth	Lord Chancellor; 1340	Succeeded by Robert de Stratford
Catholic Church titles
Preceded by Rigaud of Assier	Bishop of Winchester; 1323–1333	Succeeded by Adam Orleton
Preceded by Simon Mepeham	Archbishop of Canterbury; 1333–1348	Succeeded by John de Ufford
