= Andrew Stratford =

Medieval English landowner of the Stratford family

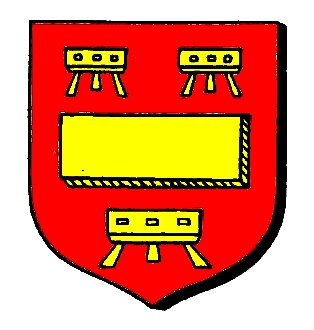
Coat of arms associated with Andrew de Stratford: Gules, a fess humette between three trestles, or

Andrew Stratford (died 30 November 1378), also known as Andrew de Stratford and Andrew de Strelford, was a medieval English landowner and verderer of the House of Stratford.

== Personal life and family ==
Andrew was born into the House of Stratford around the beginning of the fourteenth century, a relation of Archbishop of Canterbury John de Stratford and his brother Robert Stratford (Bishop of Chichester). He was an associate of William of Wykeham, Bishop of Winchester and Chancellor of England. He married a woman called Christine, and they had a son (Robert) and through him at least two grandchildren (John and Joan). When Robert died prematurely, some time before 1392, Joan was sent to Romsey Abbey, becoming a nun on 19 September 1400, and his grandson John became a ward of the king, later inheriting his grandfather's lands. His descendants continued into the modern day, and can still be found in parts of Hampshire.

== Career ==
=== Church Clerk ===
Prior to 1362 he was rector of the church of Gosberton, Lincolnshire, but exchanged it with Phillip de weston for the prebendary of Langtoft, which he held from 1362 to 1363. Throughout his life he held numerous church offices (at lay clerk level), including Canon of York, though he never progressed to the clergy; it is likely Stratford's comfortable career as a clerk in the church was aided by his influential ecclesiastical relatives (John, Robert and Ralph), and his friendship with the powerful William of Wykeham.

=== Verderer and landowner ===
In later life he became a significant landowner in Hampshire and Wiltshire, as well as an active member of the communities, often loaning money to local businessmen and legally witnessing matters relating to land and property. He held (with his wife) land called ‘Haresmede’ in the northern part of South Baddesley (then called simply Baddesley) in the New Forest (referred to confusingly as "North Baddesley in the New Forest," but distinct from the separate village of North Baddesley, which is not in the New Forest), and acted as Verderer in the forest of "Claryndon" in Wiltshire until his death. He also held land in Vernhams Dean in the county of Hampshire, alongside land in Chute, Whelpley, Cowesfield, Alderstone and Winterbourne, in the county of Wiltshire. These passed on to his son Robert and, when he came of age, to his grandson John.

== Death ==
Stratford died on 30 November 1378, his widow Christine dying 31 July 1396. Their son Robert died around the late 1380s, at which time his grandson John became ward of the king, and his granddaughter Joan was sent to Romsey Abbey, where she became a nun in 1399.
