= Roger Northburgh =

Bishop of Coventry and Lichfield and Treasurer of England (died 1358)

- Bishop of Coventry and Lichfield
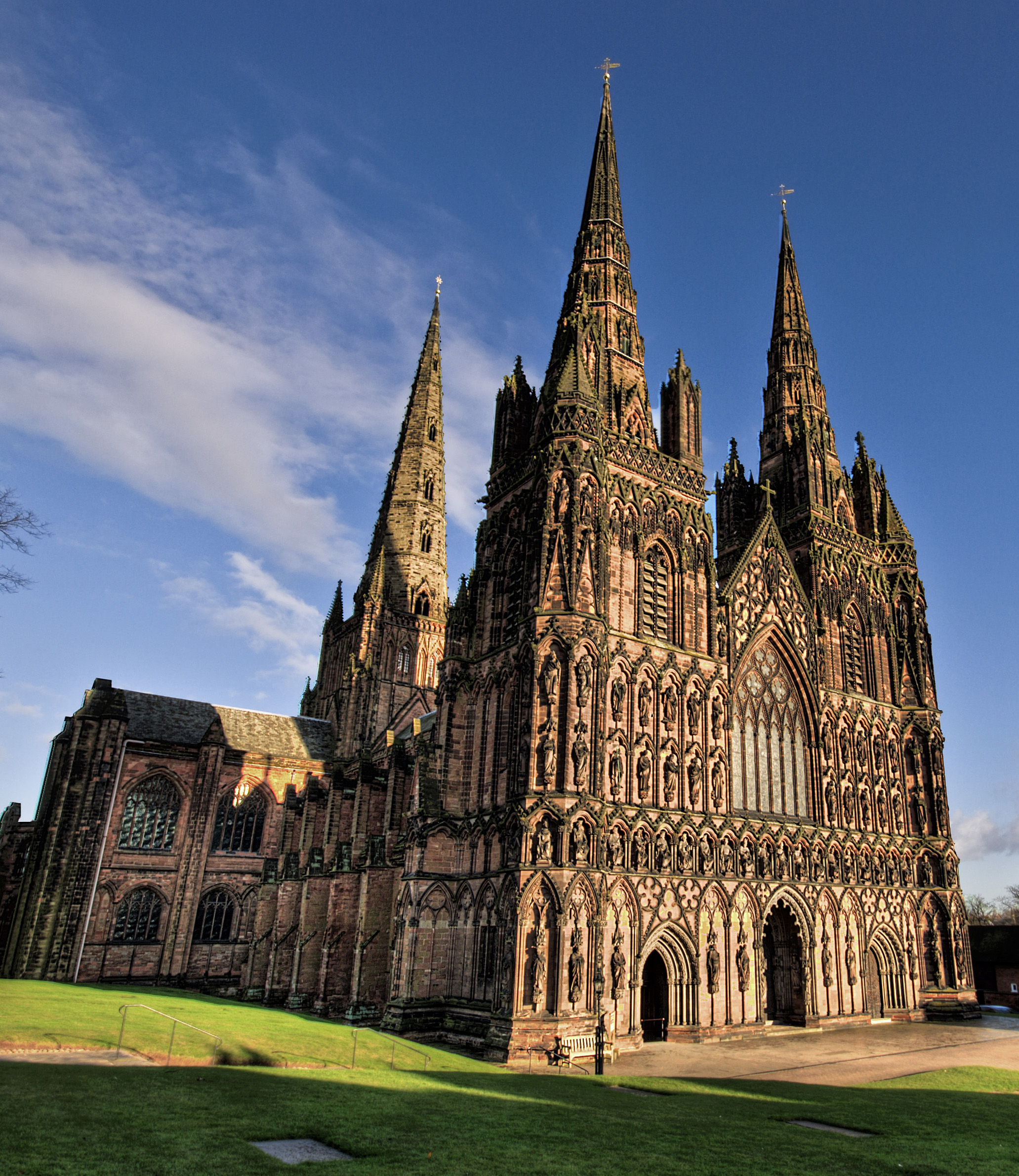
- Lichfield Cathedral
- Archdiocese: Province of Canterbury
- Appointed: 14 December 1321
- Term ended: 22 November 1358
- Predecessor: Walter Langton
- Successor: Robert de Stretton
- Previous post: Archdeacon of Richmond

Orders
- Consecration: 27 June 1322 by Thomas Cobham, the Bishop of Worcester

Personal details
- Born: Reputedly Norbury, Staffordshire
- Died: 22 November 1358
- Denomination: Catholic

Roger Northburgh (died 1358) was a cleric, administrator and politician who was Bishop of Coventry and Lichfield from 1321 until his death. His was a stormy career as he was inevitably involved in many of the conflicts of his time: military, dynastic and ecclesiastical.

== Origins and education ==
Northburgh was long supposed to derive his name from Norbury, Staffordshire, which was considered his birthplace. Sometimes his name has even been rendered as Norbury, as in the edition of his episcopal register by Edmund Hobhouse. However, the identification is no longer accepted as certain. Norbury is, in any case, a very common toponym: even within Northburgh's diocese, there were several examples. Nothing definite is known of his background. He seems to have communicated in Norman French, which makes it likely, but still not certain, that he came from the landed class of French descent.

Northburgh is often said to have been educated at Cambridge University. His interest in the university around 1321 makes this plausible, but there is no direct evidence to support it. He must have acquired an adequate education in Latin to perform his ecclesiastical functions.

== Royal servant ==
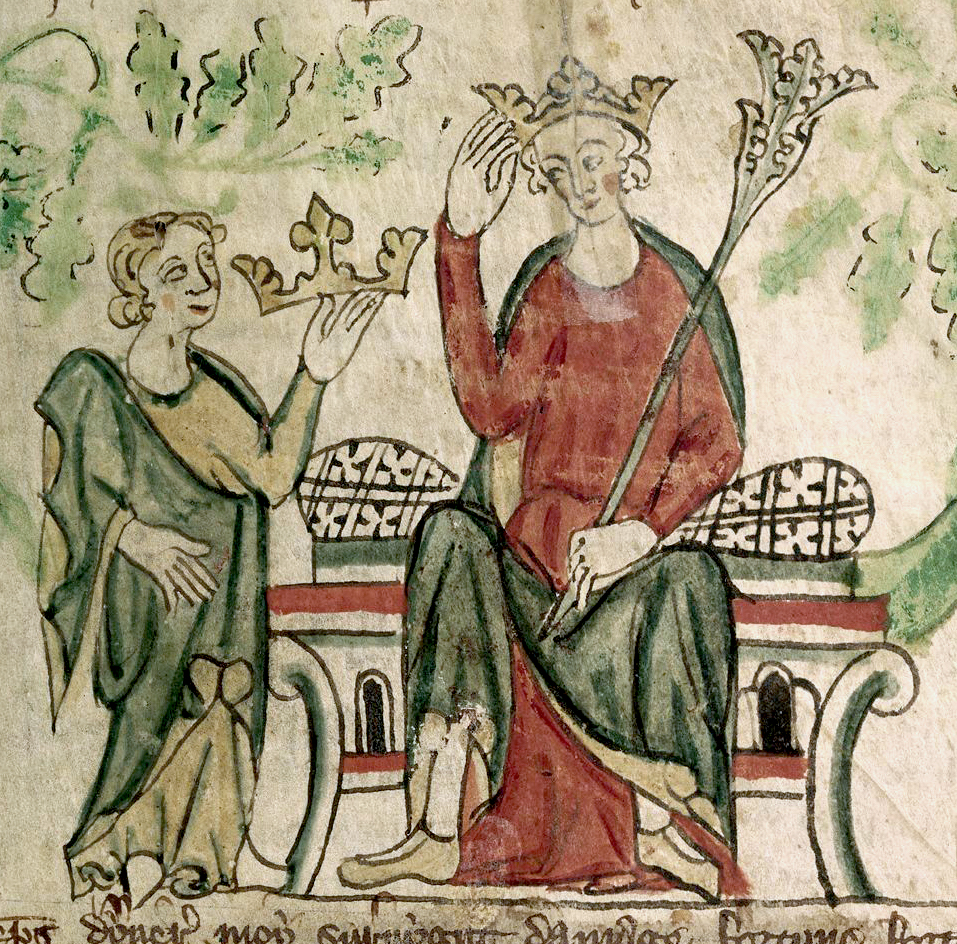
Edward II receiving the crown.

Northburgh appears as early as 1306–7, during the reign of Edward I, already employed in the royal wardrobe. This was the recruiting ground from which senior figures in the royal government were drawn. By 1310, under Edward II he was a wardrobe clerk on a wage of 7½d. per day. However, the wardrobe was coming under great pressure from the powerful baronial opposition, the Lords Ordainers, and its funds reducing as they sought to reduce the independent power of the monarchy. In 1311–12, Northburgh accompanied the king as he led an army to Scotland and then across northern England, while the Ordainers, dominated the south.

== Keeper of the Privy Seal ==
It is unclear at exactly what point Northburgh was given custody of the Privy Seal, although he definitely held the post by 18 September 1312 and continued in office until 1316. He was not given the formal title of Keeper of the Privy Seal until 1315, apparently the first so-called, although the function had existed for some time. His keepership is regarded as decisive in constituting it as a separate office. The administrators who worked under him, although at first numbered among the wardrobe clerks, became titled "clerks of the privy seal," thus constituting a separate staff for the first time.

The barons were determined to separate control of the privy seal from the court, which they saw as the source of the nation's ills, and Northburgh seemed ready to work with them. Under the terms imposed on the king by parliament, Northburgh was compelled to work in London with his staff, separately from the rest of the Court, which kept its distance from the barons. He was in London with three clerks during the autumn of 1312 and again, with his staff enlarged to four, for the early part of 1313, and yet again, with two assistants, from February to May. During these absences, John of Reading, a clerk in the royal household forged the privy seal and a major scandal broke, tainting for a time senior members of the royal household whom he tried to implicate in his crime. However, his trial in February 1313 concluded that he was acting alone and he was hanged, despite benefit of clergy. In the summer of 1313 Northburgh was reunited with the king for a time, accompanying him on a journey to France, but was away again in the early part of 1314.

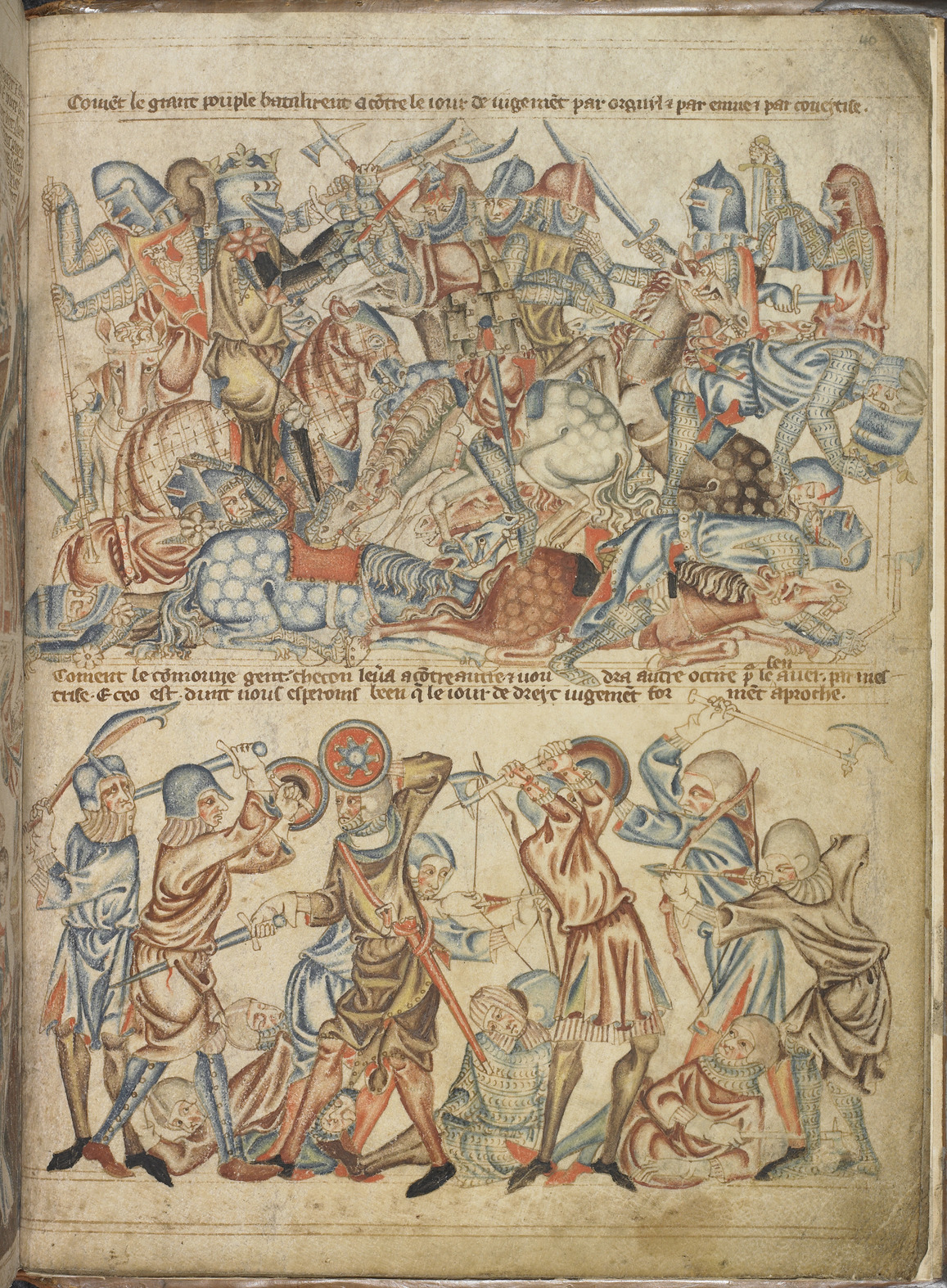
Depiction of the Battle of Bannockburn from the Holkham Bible.

Northburgh rejoined the king for the campaign of summer 1314 in Scotland, which was hampered from the outset by lack of resources. He and the two clerks accompanying him were captured at the Battle of Bannockburn in June, along with the seal itself, and his accounts of the administration of the wardrobe were lost. Some of the king's debts were not paid for more than twenty years, as the records were missing. The king was forced to write from Berwick-upon-Tweed to every English sheriff to warn them that the seal was no longer under his control and not to act solely on its authority. The logical problem of validating the letter itself was solved by using the seal of Queen Isabella, and this continued in use until mid-July, when a new privy seal came into use. Northburgh was probably soon at liberty again and acts issued on his initiative recommenced on 22 November. He retained the seal and was with the court intermittently in the first half of 1315, but he was given leave of absence from July to October. He became Keeper of the wardrobe from 1 February 1316, after the previous keeper, William Melton, was elected Archbishop of York. He was to hold the post until 1322.

== Ecclesiastical preferment ==
Near the beginning of his political and ecclesiastical career, Northburgh is found in 1308 as a subdeacon, the lowest of the major orders of the Church, but already a rector in the Diocese of Carlisle, and securing papal permission to take a further benefice, valued at 50 marks This was perhaps the rectory in the Diocese of Exeter that he was holding in 1313, when he next received leave to hold benefices in plurality. The number extra was two, and Kingsford reports three possible candidates, all royal grants, including two in the Diocese of Lincoln.

For some years from 1315 the king made persistent efforts to equip his faithful servant Northburgh with further ecclesiastical benefices to provide a steady income in keeping with his status. Initially he tried to place Northburgh in canonries with lucrative prebends at various cathedrals. On 11 June 1315 the king granted him the prebend of Wistow in the Archdiocese of York. This was already the subject of a succession battle that had gone on for two years. The king was forced to make the grant again on 10 December, allowing Northburgh to ease out John Nassington, the victor of the earlier struggle, in the following year. On 26 July 1315 the king granted Northburgh the prebend of Farndon-cum-Balderton in the Diocese of Lincoln. This attempt proved unsuccessful as the prebend was already occupied by an absentee Italian cleric. However the grant of the prebend of Stoke, also in Lincoln Diocese, on 1 November 1315 proved more fruitful. The incumbent, possibly the same Italian cleric, proved vulnerable here, as the prebend had been declared vacant during the reign of Edward I, and he was canonically removed by the bishop on 29 July 1316.

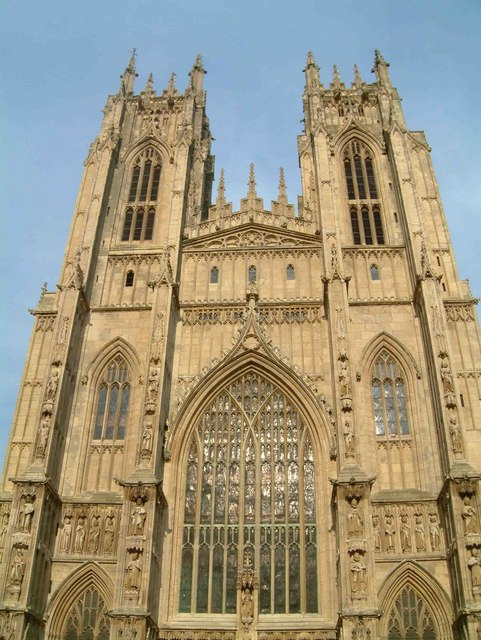
Beverley Minster, one of many churches where Northbugh held a canonry.

In March 1316 papal approval was given, at the king's request, for Northburgh to be provided to a canonry at Wells Cathedral and a long list is given of the benefices he already occupies, including two not already noted: a parish church in the Diocese of Bath and Wells and a prebend of Beverley Minster. However, the provision seems never have happened: this was a period of interregnum for the papacy and there is no subsequent mention of Northburgh among the canons of Wells. Also 1316 the king attempted to present Northburgh to the prebend of Blewbury in the Diocese of Salisbury However, the right of presentation was contested here and the subsequent series of legal challenges dragged on for ten years, leaving Northburgh empty handed. Further confusion attended the king's presentation of Northburgh to the prebend of Piona Parva in the Diocese of Hereford in 1317. In this case the king himself unaccountably granted the position to Roger Nassington concurrently. Northburgh emerged victorious but in 1318 exchanged the prebend for that of Yatesbury in the Diocese of Salisbury, which he held until he became a bishop. Northburgh was also successfully inserted into an unidentified prebend of the Diocese of St David's, where he is attested on 14 March 1317.

These were relatively small income streams. However, the king also briefly attempted to make Northburgh Dean of St Paul's, with what serious hope of success is unclear. There had already been a three-year wrangle over the position, with the king initially favouring John Sandale, while the pope provided Vitalis de Testa, and Richard Newport was elected. However two contenders dropped out of the race by acquiring bishoprics: Sandale became Bishop of Winchester and Newport Bishop of London. Northburgh was imposed by royal grant at some time in early 1317, as the pope complained in May that he had illegally taken charge and requested the king to protect the interests of Vitalis. Northburgh also briefly acquired the St Paul's prebend of Newington by royal grant on 1 January 1317. However, Vitalis emerged victorious in 1318 and Northburgh seems to have abandoned hope of an economic or power base in the capital. He settled for being Archdeacon of Richmond, a post to which he was appointed by royal grant of 29 May 1317. On 24 September of that year he made his profession of loyalty to William Melton, whose consecration as Archbishop of York had been greatly delayed, and remained in post until he became a bishop. The powerful and wealthy Archdiaconate of Richmond, dominating much of the north-west of England, was able to act in most respects as a diocese in its own right, with its own consistory court and complete control of institutions to benefices.

With his promotions, the king tried to ensure that the emoluments of previous occupants of the offices passed to Northburgh. For example, a letter under the privy seal was sent to the Abbess of Wilton ordering her to transfer a pension paid to Ralph de Stoke, previous keeper of the wardrobe, to the new man.

== Keeper of the wardrobe ==
Tout saw Northburgh as part of a "middle party," between the king and his most redoubtable opponent, Thomas, 2nd Earl of Lancaster, which formed during 1317-18 and attempted to win the king's trust for the moderate, reforming baronial opposition, centred on Bartholomew de Badlesmere, 1st Baron Badlesmere and Aymer de Valence, 2nd Earl of Pembroke Davies had already expressed a similar view. The idea that there was any such party is now generally rejected, but there was certainly a considerable number of churchmen who sought to mediate the disputes. As keeper of the wardrobe, Northburgh had great responsibilities in the area of royal finances and corresponding opportunities to seek compromise reforms.

The parliament of 1318, convened on 20 October at York, came after a reconciliation between the king and Lancaster, who had dominated the political scene since Bannockburn. It was attended by Northburgh, who was claiming an allowance for conducting negotiations with the Scots. It made a serious effort to reform the royal household. An audit of Northburgh's accounts showed that the wardrobe had recovered some of its former financial power by 1318, and an increasing proportion of its resources came from "foreign" sources, i.e. income streams that did not pass through the Exchequer and were not easily subject to outside scrutiny. A reform committee was set up, changes made in personnel, and a reform ordinance, prescribing much greater accountability, and closer definition of the roles of royal officials, drafted by a Northburgh, Badlesmere, Despenser and Gilbert Wigton, the controller of the wardrobe. This was accepted by the king. After this, the wardrobe seems to have run smoothly under Northburgh's administration, with receipts and expenditure rising only in time of war, particularly the abortive expedition to reverse the capture of Berwick.

The idea that Northburgh was Chancellor of the University of Cambridge from 1321 to 1326 is now discredited, although it goes back at least as far as Henry Wharton's 1691 compilation of episcopal biographies, Anglia Sacra. It seems to stem from his initiation of a scheme for the university to set up halls of residence for theology and philosophy students, financed by an investment in the advowsons of churches. This was given a royal licence on 5 February 1321. Nothing more came of the project.

Northburgh was recommended for preferment to the pope by the king in letters from 1318 to 1320. From 1320 to mid-1321 he was also the king's candidate to become a cardinal. John de Stratford also claimed that this was one of the aims of his protracted mission to Avignon, from which he emerged as Bishop of Winchester in 1323. However, when the Diocese of Coventry and Lichfield became vacant late in 1321, Northburgh was not the king's preferred candidate.

== Bishop of Coventry and Lichfield ==
=== Elevation to episcopacy ===
Walter Langton, Bishop of Coventry and Lichfield, died on 9 November 1321 and the king issued a licence to elect the new bishop on 22 of the month. However, there was disagreement between the secular clergy of the chapter at Lichfield Cathedral and the Benedictine monks of the chapter at Coventry Cathedral, over whether they were to be equal partners in the election: a position agreed during the time of Bishop Roger Weseham (1245–56), although the dispute stretched back to the tortuous election process following the death of Geoffrey de Muschamp in 1208. The Lichfield canons decided to appeal to Pope John XXII over the issue, initiating a case that was to drag on for twelve years. The king wrote to the Pope requesting that he provide Robert Baldock, then keeper of the privy seal, to the see. The Coventry chapter, however, went ahead with the election, choosing their own prior, Henry, who is identified with Henry of Leicester by Fasti Ecclesiae.

All of these moves proved futile, as the Pope provided Northburgh to the vacant see on 14 December, apparently without reference to the other candidates, and wrote to the king, the Archbishop, the chapters, the clergy and the people of the diocese, informing them of the appointment on 19 January 1322: in May the unfortunate Baldock was promised a canonry and prebend at Salisbury Cathedral. The spring of that year was marked by the revolt of Thomas of Lancaster and the Battle of Boroughbridge on 16 March. Hence, it not surprising that Northburgh had to wait until 12 April to be invested with the temporalities.

From this point Northburgh began to take control of the diocese, although he was forced to assemble a team of deputies, as he had not yet set foot in either of the diocesan centres. He appointed Master Ralph Holbeach as his commissary-general, dealing with appointments among other matters. Holbeach was forced to act quickly, responding to recent political events. He installed in the prebend of Gaia Major William of Harlaston, a clerk of the chancery who was trusted to look after both the privy seal and the Great Seal on occasion, as John of Chelmsford, the incumbent, had been deprived for supporting Lancaster's revolt: this was a decision Chelmsford later emerged from prison to contest. Holbeach also had to see that John of Kynardessey, a clerical client of Lancaster, was transferred to the prebend of Flixton, apparently making room for Robert Baldock in that of Eccleshall, although the details are complex and hazy, and were to lead to further disputes later.

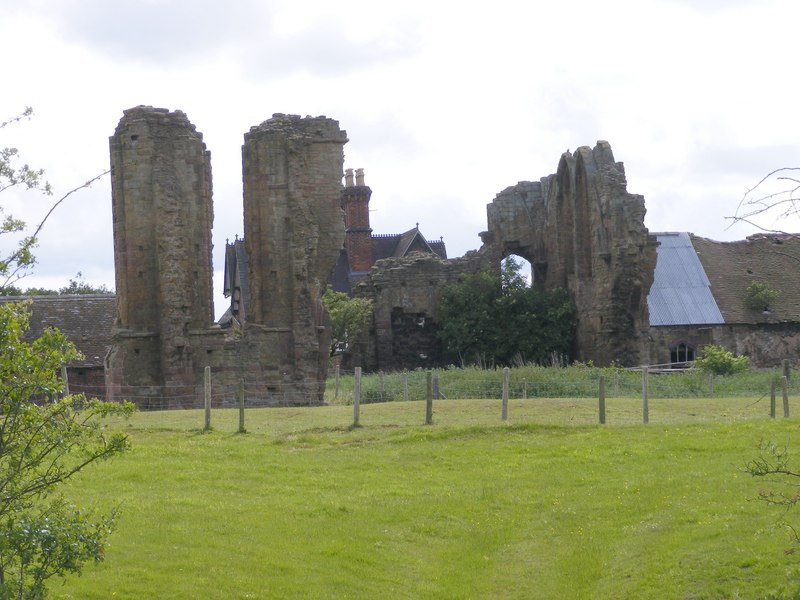
remains of Halesowen Abbey, where Northbugh was consecrated in 1322.

While at Rothwell, Northamptonshire with the king, Northburgh appointed Gilbert Ó Tigernaig, the Bishop of Annaghdown (rendered in the diocesan register as Enagdun) as suffragan bishop, to carry out ordinations and other necessary episcopal functions, and Stephen Blound as seneschal. Later, from Bosworth he recommissioned Holbeach, widening his powers, and appointed as his vicar general Geoffrey of Blaston, the experienced Archdeacon of Derby. These were troubled times and there were apparently already disturbances in the diocese. A sentence of excommunication had to be read out at Eccleshall against parishioners suspected of breaking into the bishop's deer parks, although it is unclear whether this concerned Blore, near Eccleshall, or Brewood, further south, or both, as both are mentioned. It later transpired that one of the malefactors was a cleric, Thomas de Stretton, who with his brother William, was later fined for a series of outrages: roaming with an armed gang, carrying out assaults and raiding Brewood Park to carry off game.

Northburgh was at last consecrated on 27 June at Halesowen Abbey by Thomas Cobham, the Bishop of Worcester and five other bishops. He decreed a forty-day indulgence to pilgrims who visited the Abbey's most important relic, the head of St Barbara, so long as they also made a gift and said both the Lord's Prayer for the king and queen and the Hail Mary in English. He made his profession of obedience to the Archbishop of Canterbury on 31 August.

=== Diocesan conflicts ===
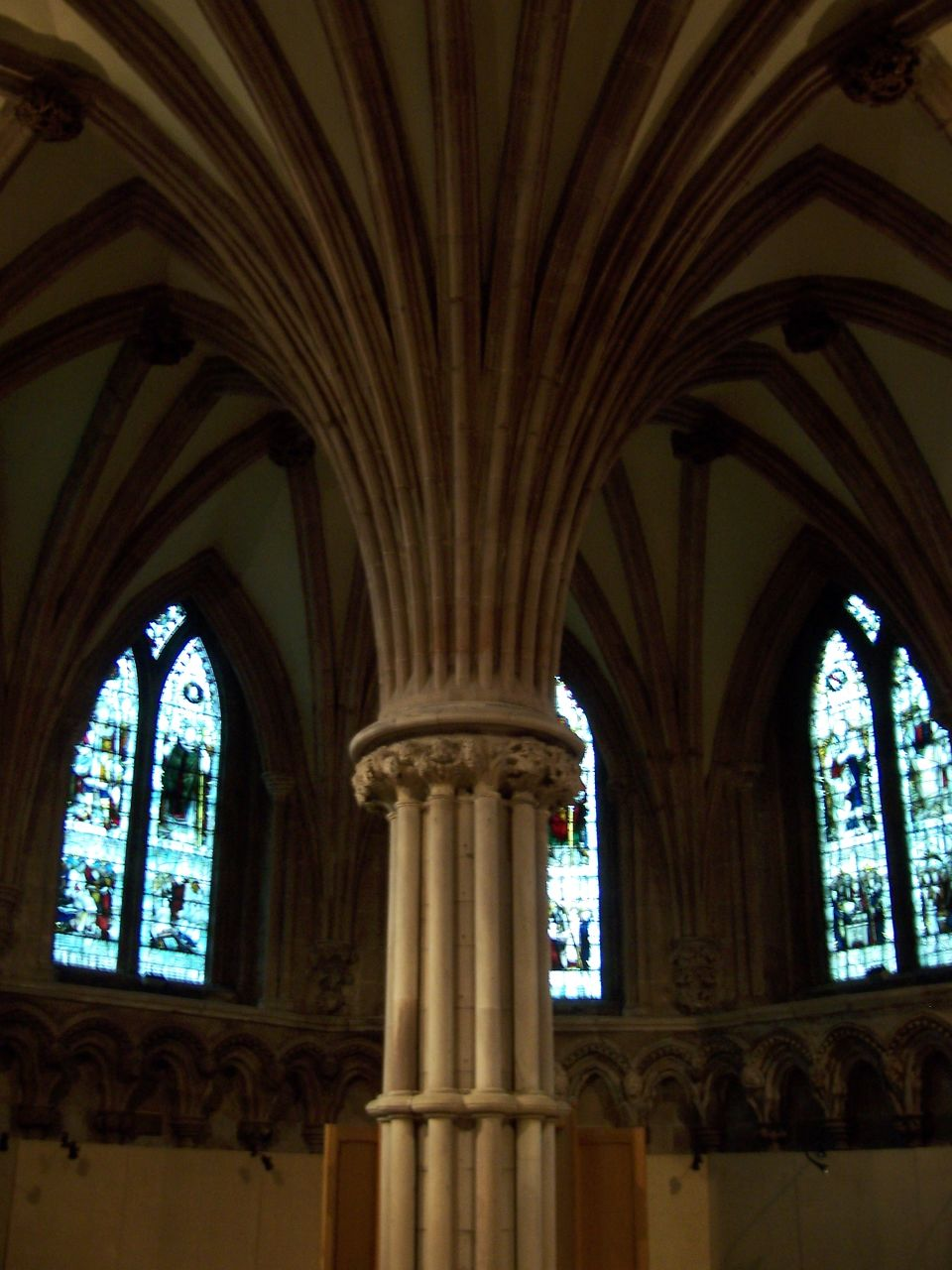
The chapter house at Lichfield cathedral.

Northburgh was in almost constant conflict with his Lichfield chapter. An underlying problem was that most of the senior diocesan posts, and many of the less important, were filled by papal provision, leading to high rate of absenteeism. Nearly half, 47 out of 98, of the appointments of canons in Northburgh's episcopate were made in this way. Northburgh's treasurers, a key role in the diocese, were both important foreign prelates. Until 1348 the post was occupied by Gaucelin Johannis Deuza of Cahors, who was cardinal priest of Santi Marcellino e Pietro al Laterano: Then came Hugh Pelegrini, a papal nuncio. Both were absentees. The problem became immediately apparent, as Northburgh's first major decision was to conduct a thorough canonical visitation of the diocese, starting with the Archdeaconry of Stafford. The Deanery, another key post in the administration, was occupied by Stephen Segrave, who was absent at the Roman Curia, at that time based in Avignon. Northburgh's proposal to visit the chapter itself led to a protest from Dean Segrave, who claimed exclusive rights to discipline the canons. The canons wrote to Northburgh requesting a delay because the dean was still at Avignon. However, Northburgh visited the Coventry chapter on 27 September and at Michaelmas wrote to Lichfield, rejecting the request for a delay and asserting the importance of the proposed visitation. Northburgh seems to have simply reiterated his original citation, rejected the claim of immunity and proceeded with the visitation.

Probably seeing that he would get little practical help from the chapter, Northburgh appointed William Weston as his official, assigned him the prebend of Dasset Parva, and set out on the visitation of Stafford Archdeaconry, which included the areas immediately surrounding Lichfield itself. Problems and resistance were soon encountered. The king's invasion of Scotland had ended in an ignominious retreat and some parishes had to be exempted from visitation because their men had been called away to help resist a Scottish counter-invasion. The parishioners of Abbots Bromley refused to appear at Colton parish church and were excommunicated. At Cheswardine there were more excommunications after the bishop's representative was assaulted. As the military situation worsened, Northburgh was summoned by the king and had to call off the visitation completely.

Northburgh's excommunication of the Archdeacon of Chester in 1323 led to a repetition of the earlier protests, as the archdeacon was a member of the cathedral chapter. The Bishop's steward, probably Blound, presumed to test the weights and measures used by the canons and was brought before the chapter, where Segrave abused both him and Northburgh. Segrave had been provided by the pope to become Archbishop of Armagh in 1323 but was allowed to postpone his transfer for a year. He resigned the deanery at last on 29 April 1324, when he was consecrated at Avignon. Northburgh tried to use the vacancy to take over jurisdiction, and the chapter wrote to other cathedrals with chapters of secular clergy for advice. Segrave's replacement, Roger de Covenis, was provided by the Pope and was installed on 24 November. He too was keen to uphold the established order at the cathedral, but his commitment to the post did not last long: he exchanged it with John Garssia in 1328 for a canonry at Lleida. However, the chapter continued to defend itself against the Bishop, paying for legal representation from a common fund. By 1329 there were seven cases pending in the Court of Arches.

=== Diocesan business ===
The ODNB entry on Northburgh describes him as apparently "efficient and conscientious" as a bishop. There is evidence that he undertook further visitations in 1331, 1338 and 1378–8. He seems generally to have been supportive to serving clergy and fairly sensitive to the needs of the laity, while often firm with clerical laxity.

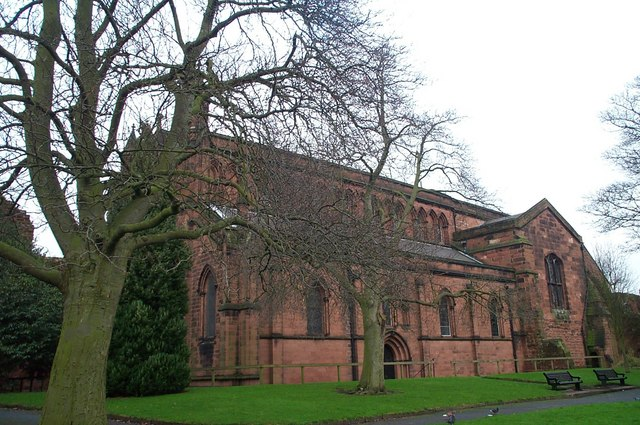
St John's, Chester, today. The church has been truncated at the eastern end since Northburgh's time.

At St John the Baptist's Church, Chester, a great collegiate church, Northburgh's visitation of 1331 found the usual absenteeism by the chapter, who relied on poorly paid vicars to perform their work. He gave the vicars security of tenure, ordering that they be dismissed only with his own permission, and ordered that they be paid punctually and allowed to use the dwellings of the absentee canons, pending provision of proper common quarters. When he visited in 1348 he found that the vicars were still not being allowed to use the premises of the canons. Moreover, absenteeism and poor management had wasted resources, allowing the fabric of the building and the liturgical vestments to deteriorate alarmingly. This time he cancelled outstanding leases and capped the canons' incomes at 16 marks, earmarking the surplus for necessary work.

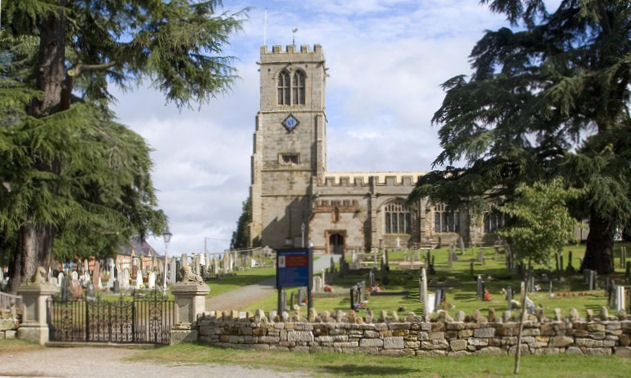
St Chad's church in Hanmer, where the rector served Welsh-speaking clergy and laity as a penitentiary or confessor. Welsh-speaking areas stretched well into Shropshire and Cheshire in Northburgh's day.

Language issues seem to have loomed large and Northburgh intervened in various ways to remove barriers to communication. When appointing penitentiaries for the diocese, empowered to hear confessions from all the laity and clergy of their districts, Northburgh took care to ensure that there was one to serve the Welsh language speakers – the Rector of Hanmer, near Wrexham – as well as several to work in English. He also licensed John Gilbert to start an embryonic grammar school at Oswestry. Latin was a barrier even to many clerics and religious. After visiting Farewell Priory, very close to Lichfield, in 1331, Northburgh had a good deal to say about enforcing better discipline and segregation from lay people, but was compelled to have his decrees translated from the customary Latin into Norman French to ensure there was no excuse of incomprehension for the nuns.

Northburgh carried out numerous visitations to religious houses, as well as intervening on other occasions to secure improvements in governance. In 1322 William de Bloxham, the Prior of Arbury, offered his resignation as soon as a visitation was announced, explaining that he was insufficiens ad regimen, not up to the task of leadership, as soon as Northburgh arrived in the diocese and Holbeach was deputed to hold an inquiry. Evidently Holbeach recommended acceptance of the Prior's resignation, as shortly afterwards Northburgh was making enquiries about the competence and character of John de Borebach, the prior-elect. Later still, under 1326, Northburgh's register has a record of the Prior being deprived, but this appears out of place: it cannot refer to Borebach, who survived in office until 1329. Hobhouse, the editor, conjectured it had been added as a model document for such occasions. Another displaced entry makes clear that provision was made for the retirement of the former prior.

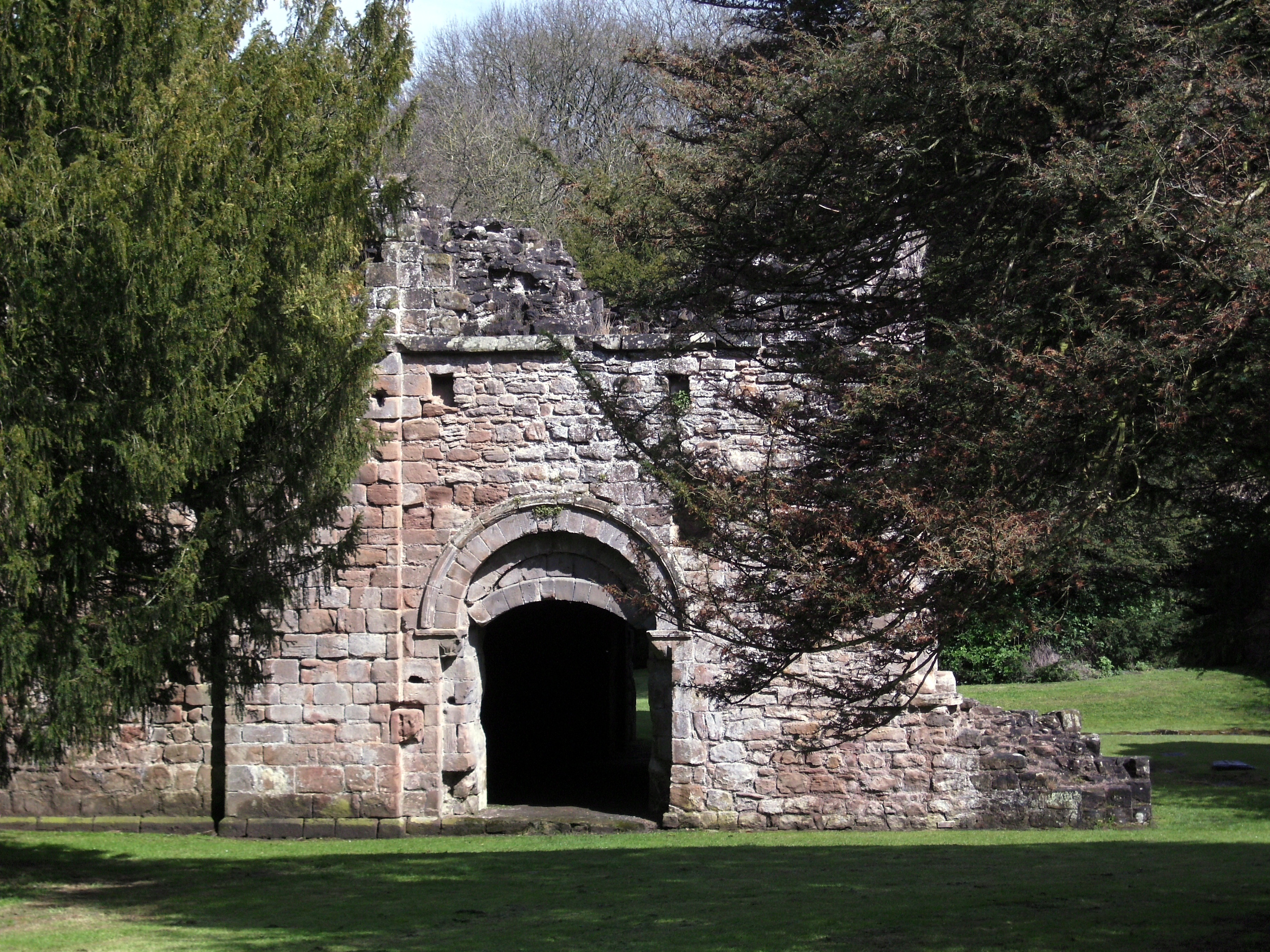
Part of the domestic range at Lilleshall Abbey, which included the abbot's lodging.

John of Chetwynd, abbot of Lilleshall seems to have resigned in 1330 with a visitation in the offing. Northburgh's register records the proposals made for his retirement by the Augustinian canons, who described Chetwynd as "much beloved." His allowance was substantial and burdensome to the community: the building where he lived, including several rooms and a chapel, heating, wax for six candles during winter, a corrody equal in value to that of two canons, a servant, two grooms, a canon to act as chaplain, and a palfrey and baggage-horse, with their fodder. Allegedly to cover his clothing, he was also to receive the income from two of the abbey's manors, Blackfordby in Leicestershire and Freasley, near Tamworth and of two of its churches. Finally his guests and family were to receive to receive reasonable hospitality at Lilleshall. An earlier visitation, probably in 1324, had reported that Chetwynd ran the abbey in a wasteful, dictatorial and unaccountable way. In fact Chetwynd had a history of criminality and violence. In 1316 he and John Ipstones, one of Staffordshire's most turbulent landowners, had raised an armed force to rescue a highway robber who had taken a large sum of money belonging to the king and destined for Ireland. Warrants were issued for their arrest but Chetwynd escaped and went into hiding. Old habits continued and, a year after his retirement, Chetwynd fell out with his successor and raided the abbey with a gang of armed men to seize goods, necessitating a royal intervention to restore order.

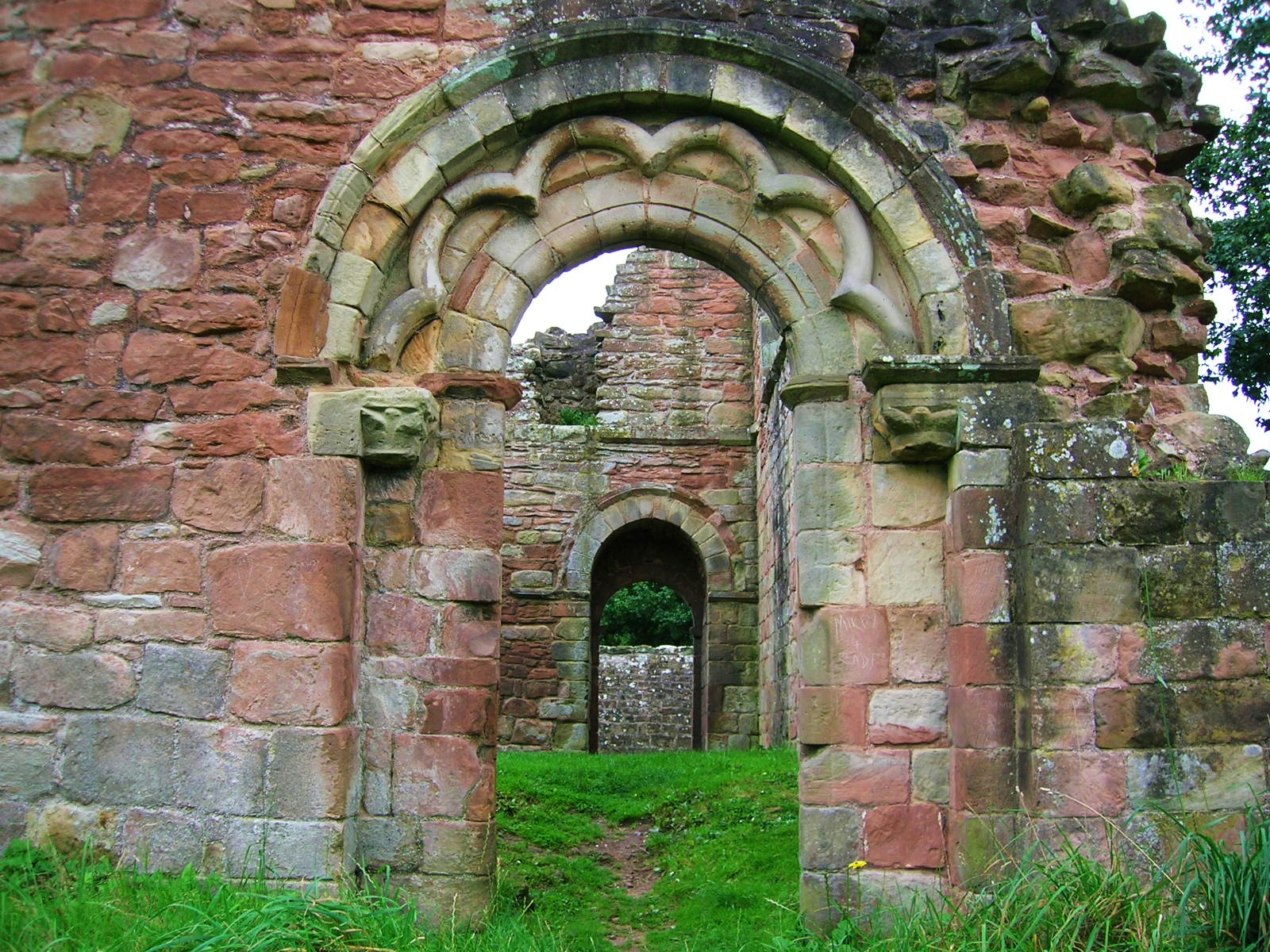
Night entrance of White Ladies Priory, an Augustinian house in Shropshire.

Women's houses brought criticisms, often of a similar kind. Northburgh had to intervene in the case of Elizabeth la Zouche, who, with another canoness, deserted White Ladies Priory, near Brewood, in 1326. Initially the case was simply advertised in churches. She seems not to have returned until 1331, when she had to confess before Northburgh in Brewood parish church, ask for readmission at the priory entrance and undergo penance. When he visited White Ladies in 1338, Northburgh reprimanded the prioress, Alice Harley, for financial mismanagement and extravagance, including her expenditure on clothes. He also demanded that she cease hunting with hounds.

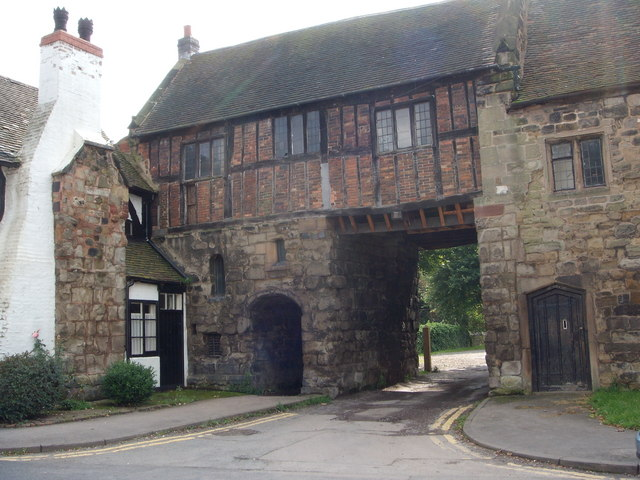
Polesworth Abbey gatehouse, Warwickshire.

However, Polesworth Abbey in Warwickshire seems to have had a special relationship with the Bishops, Northburgh included, through most of the 14th century and enjoyed unusual favour. One of Northburgh's earliest measures after taking up the see was to grant extraordinary pastoral and liturgical powers to Maud, the abbess-elect. In September 1327 the Pope wrote to the Bishop of Hereford asking him to intervene and secure justice between the rector of Eyton in Shropshire and the abbess of Polesworth. Northburgh had forced Thomas, the rector, to swear to pay the abbess two thirds of his income as a pension before allowing him to be inducted. On taking up the post, Thomas found the remaining third of the revenue insufficient to support him. The Pope had already intervened, ordering members of the Lichfield chapter to annul the oath: Richard Bernard, the Archdeacon of Salop, William de Bosco, the Chancellor, and Gilbert de Bruer, prebendary of Wolvey. He had also ordered the abbess to take the matter no further. However, she had got judgement against Thomas in the secular courts, claiming that the pension was a charge on the rectory instituted by Walter Langton, Northburgh's predecessor. Moreover, the Chancellor and Bruer had delegated their powers to Roger le Mareschall, the prebendary of Dernford, and he and Bernard refused to take the matter further. Once Thomas appealed to the Pope, the abbess had deprived him of his rectory and given it to William de Ipstones. Nothing more is reported of the case. When Northburgh visited the abbey in 1352 he found little to remark upon. He had his injunctions delivered in French, as was now the custom with women's houses.

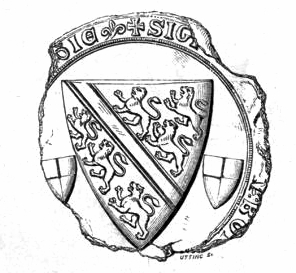
Counter seal of John, Earl of Hereford.

Northburgh also attracted papal criticism for refusing to deal with a consanguinity case. In February 1331 he and Stephen Gravesend, the Bishop of London, were ordered by John XXII to summon witnesses to London to investigate the case of John de Bohun, 5th Earl of Hereford, and Margaret Bassett, of a prominent Staffordshire family. The couple had discovered after their marriage that they were related to the fourth degree. They were at that time living apart. However, a papal letter three years later makes clear that Northburgh refused to act. The pope was forced to relaunch the enquiry, nominating canons from London and Lincoln to replace Northburgh on the panel. The reasons for Northburgh's inaction are not made clear. He certainly had no principled objection to giving dispensations for cousin marriage: he had ratified a papal dispensation in exactly the same circumstances in the interim. A political grudge might offer an explanation: John de Bohun's father, Humphrey de Bohun, 4th Earl of Hereford, had been one of the moderate ordainers but was provoked by personal conflict with Hugh Despenser the Younger into revolt alongside Lancaster, and was killed at Boroughbridge.

The Black Death struck in 1348 and must have created enormous spiritual and practical challenges for the diocese. However, Northburgh's register mostly reflects this only indirectly. One definite reference occurs when a recent pestilence is mentioned when dealing with the need to consecrate a chapel yard at Didsbury for burials in 1352.

== Later political career ==
=== Régime change ===
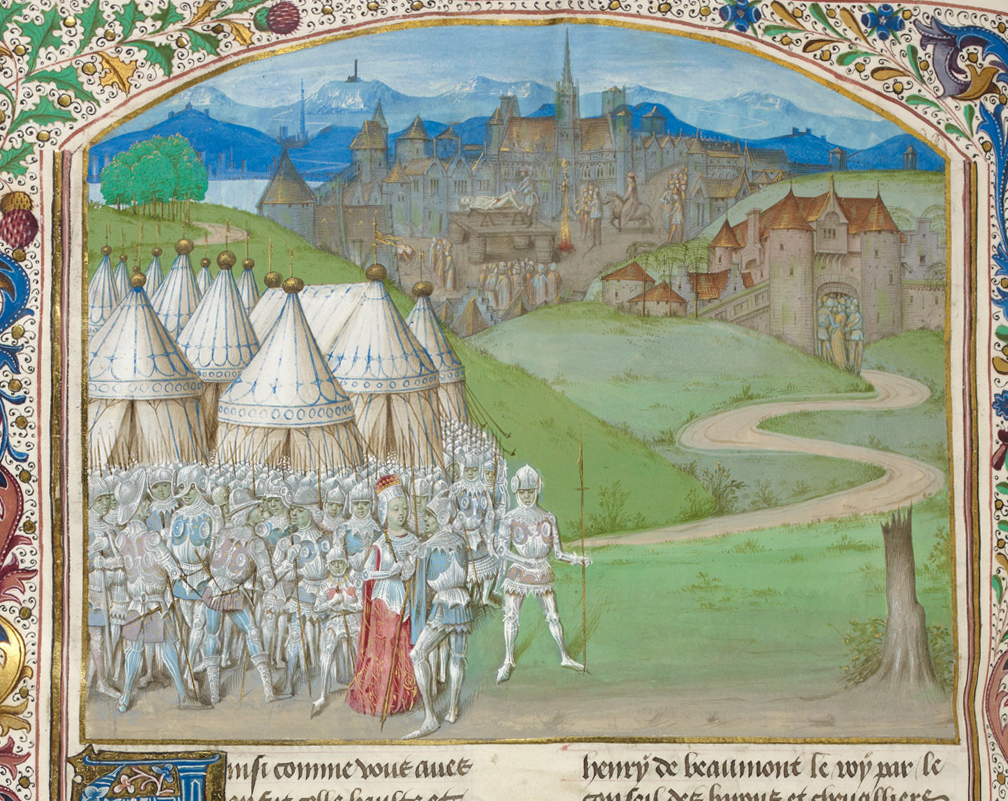
Queen Isabella and Mortimer with their troops. The execution of the younger Despenser is shown in the background.

Northburgh remained in favour with Edward II, through the difficulties of his final years. In 1323, he was sent, with others, to sequestrate the property of John de Stratford: Stratford's papal provision to the see of Winchester had displeased the king, who had once again tried to place Baldock in the post. As late as February 1326 Northburgh was ordered to give aid to the commissions of array raising troops in his diocese.

However, Northburgh made a smooth transition to the new régime, and on 13 and 20 January 1327 took the Guildhall oaths, pledging support for the privileges of the City of London and for Queen Isabella and the young Edward III. His attitude to the dominance of the Roger Mortimer, 1st Earl of March, the Marcher Lord who effectively ruled in partnership with the queen, is not known. However, he was made Treasurer on 2 March 1328, although he left the post on 20 May of the same year. He was one of several Treasurers who served for only very short periods because they moved to other work. In his case, this was an embassy to France, which set out in May. It is possible that he never actually took over the functions of Treasurer, as his predecessor, Henry Burghersh, was still acting in the post until at least late April, possibly July. Northburgh accompanied Adam Orleton, then Bishop of Worcester, arriving in Paris at the end of May, to press the claims of Edward III to the French throne after the death of his uncle, Charles IV of France. They were too late and Philip of Valois was crowned. This was a prelude to the outbreak of the Hundred Years' War.

Northburgh remained politically active after Edward III took control of his own realm in 1330. He attended the Parliament of 1333 and was one of a group of bishops and nobles appointed to discuss royal activities. On 2 March, probably of 1334, he was with the king at York and was a witness to a privy seal writ freeing the merchants of Coventry of the obligation to pay a range of tolls. The City of London's corporation duly noted the document and agreed the Coventry merchants should no longer pay murage, the toll intended to pay for the city's fortifications. Northburgh's prominence among the witnesses may suggest he had been an advocate for the merchants of his own diocese. When the king moved to assert his claim to the French throne in 1337, Northburgh was active in supporting the venture. He attended an assembly at Stamford in May to discuss financing the war, including the imposition of a royal wool monopoly. In August the king sent out writs to sheriffs and bishops ordering that assemblies of clergy and laity be held in each county to hear his case for the war against the king of France. Northburgh's summonses to the assemblies are recorded in his register. The following month he held a great diocesan assembly of clergy and a simultaneous assembly of Staffordshire laity at Stafford. Each archdeaconry appointed a specific monastery and its head to act as collectors for the tax on clergy, while the laity also voted a grant. A later assembly of merchants agreed a levy on wealthy townsmen.

=== Treasurer ===
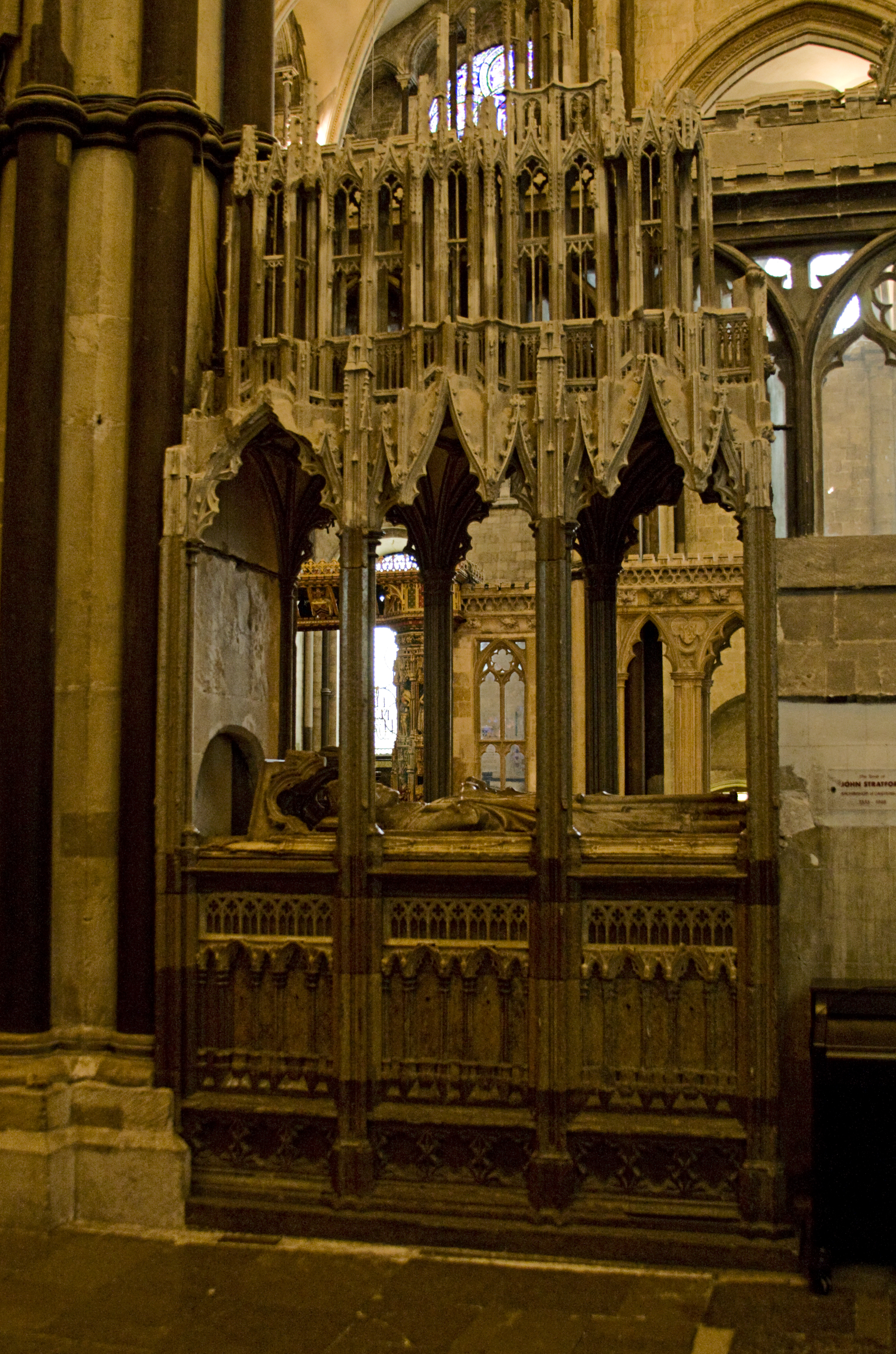
Tomb of John de Stratford in Canterbury Cathedral.

As the war went on, Northburgh was drawn further into government and into a developing constitutional crisis. On 11 June 1340 he was appointed by letters patent as commissioner, with three others, to requisition ships in the Port of London and elsewhere and fit them out for war, in readiness for assembling them as a fleet on the River Orwell. He was again appointed Treasurer on 21 June. His efforts on the king's behalf were handsomely rewarded by a grant of £200 on 6 July. As Treasurer, he was part of an administration dominated, in the absence of the king, by John de Stratford, now Archbishop of Canterbury, and containing several other Stratford family members. Northburgh seems to have been a welcome addition to the administration, a veteran administrator who shared many of Stratford's values and attitudes.

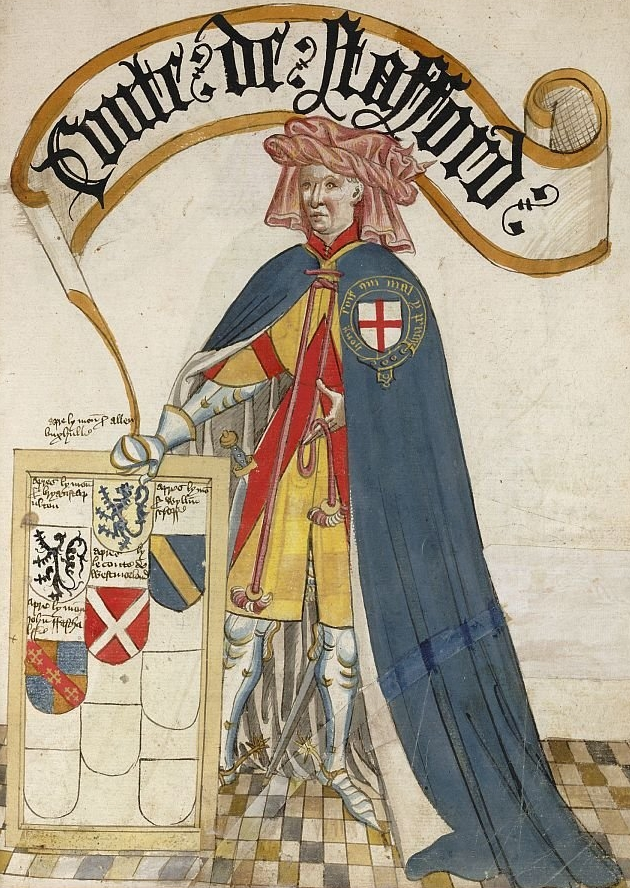
Ralph Stafford, one of the king's military clique who obstructed the bishops' access to parliament.

However, the king was becoming increasingly irritated by delays and deficiencies in the resources reaching him during his campaigns in Flanders and this came to a head while he was at Ghent in October and November 1340. He detached himself by agreement from his allies, sent a delegation to Pope Benedict II to express his feelings about Stratford, and embarked at Sluys. He arrived by surprise with a coterie of mainly military men, of whom William de Bohun, 1st Earl of Northampton, a brother of the Earl of Hereford, was the most prominent. He then carried out a coup against his own administration, removing and in some cases arresting, judges and officials whom he identified with Stratford's rule. Northburgh was called to the Tower of London on 1 December, together with Robert de Stratford, the Archbishop's brother, Bishop of Chichester and Chancellor of the Exchequer. Both were summarily dismissed, although neither was arrested. John de Stratford escaped to Canterbury Cathedral, from which he continued to preach and to denounce royal intrusions on ecclesiastical privilege. Northburgh and both Stratfords arrived at the parliament convened on 23 April 1341, armed with a safe conduct and determined to take up their seats. They were prevented for a week by two members of the royal household: Ralph de Stafford, 1st Earl of Stafford, the steward, and John Darcy, 1st Baron Darcy de Knayth, the chamberlain. They persisted and were strongly supported by John de Warenne, 7th Earl of Surrey, and his nephew, Richard FitzAlan, 10th Earl of Arundel. Their opponents finally withdrew and the king allowed all three bishops to attend. There was then a formal reconciliation but this was effectively the end of Northburgh's participation in national politics.

== Death ==
Northburgh died in office on 22 November 1358.

== Footnotes ==
Political offices
| Preceded by William Melton | Lord Privy Seal; 1312–1316 | Succeeded by Thomas Charlton |
| Preceded by William Melton | Keeper of the wardrobe 1316–1322 | Succeeded by Roger Waltham |
| Preceded by Henry Burghersh | Lord High Treasurer; 2 March 1328 – 20 May 1328 | Succeeded by Thomas Charlton |
| Preceded by Sir Robert Sadington | Lord High Treasurer; 1340–1341 | Succeeded by Sir Robert Parning |
Catholic Church titles
| Preceded by Francesco Gaetani | Archdeacon of Richmond; 1317–1322 | Succeeded by Hélie de Talleyrand-Périgord |
| Preceded by Walter Langton | Bishop of Coventry and Lichfield; 1321–1358 | Succeeded by Robert de Stretton |
