= Benedict of Gloucester =

Benedict of Gloucester (fl. 1120) was an English hagiographer, author of a life of St. Dubricius, mythological archbishop of Caerleon.

Benedict was, according to his own description of himself, a monk of St. Peter's, Gloucester. Having devoted his attention to the lives of the saints, and finding that there was no satisfactory account of St. Dubricius, he set himself the task of compiling one from what authentic records he could obtain access to. This work, which still exists in manuscript at the British Library, was edited by Henry Wharton in his Anglia Sacra, but with the omission of several miraculous details. Thomas Tanner and other authorities supposed Benedict of Gloucester to have flourished about the year 1120; but all that can definitely be said with reference to his date seems to be that he lived after this year, in which, according to Benedict's own account, the saint's bones were removed to Llandaff. There seems, however, to be little question that Benedict was indebted to Geoffrey of Monmouth, as may be seen from comparing the two authors' accounts of King Arthur's coronation and the battle of Badon. This would make the date of the 'Vita Dubricii' after the year 1147.
