= Richard of Bardney =

Richard of Bardney (fl. 1503), was an English Benedictine.

Richard of Bardney, Lincolnshire, was educated at Oxford, where he took the degree of Bachelor of Divinity. In 1503 he wrote in verse "Vita Roberti Grosthed quondam Episcopi Lincolniensis", a work of little or no value, which he dedicated to William Smith, then bishop of Lincoln. He also wrote "Historia S. Hugonis Martyris". "The Life of Robert Grosstête" is printed with some omissions in Henry Wharton's Anglia Sacra, vol. ii.
