= Stephen Birchington =

British monk and writer

Stephen Birchington (died 1407) was a British monk and writer in the 14th century.

== Life ==
His name probably derives from a village in the Isle of Thanet. He became a monk of Christ Church, Canterbury in 1382, though it is said that he had a previous connection to that house. For some time he held the offices of treasurer and warden of the manors of the monastery.

He died on 21 August 1407.

== Works ==
Birchington wrote Vitae Archiepiscoporum Cantuariensium ("Lives of the Archbishops of Canterbury"), which was later edited and published by Henry Wharton in his Anglia Sacra (1691).

Wharton hypothesised that Birchington wrote another and longer version of the Lives of the Archbishops, which was not preserved. There were three other manuscripts found in the same codex as the Vitae, which Wharton believed might have been written by Birchington: De Regibus Anglorum (a chronicle of England), De Pontificibus Romanis, and De Imperatoribus Romanis. However, the last two are now known to have been the work of the French Dominican, Bernard Gui. Nigel Ramsay has further argued that De Regibus, and another set of archiepiscopal lives held in Lambeth Palace Library, are more likely to be the work of a predecessor, working in about the 1360s, and that Birchington's original contribution, which would have continued the story into the later fourteenth century, is lost.
