= Norbury (disambiguation) =

== Places ==
Norbury may refer to these places in England:

- Norbury, Cheshire
- Norbury, Derbyshire
  - Norbury Manor, a Tudor-period manor house there
- Norbury, Greater Manchester
- Norbury, London
- Norbury, Shropshire
- Norbury, Staffordshire

or to Norbury, Saskatchewan, in Rural Municipality of Spiritwood No. 496#Urban communities, Canada

== People ==
- Norbury (surname)
- Earls of Norbury
