= Henry Wharton (writer) =

English writer (1664–1695)

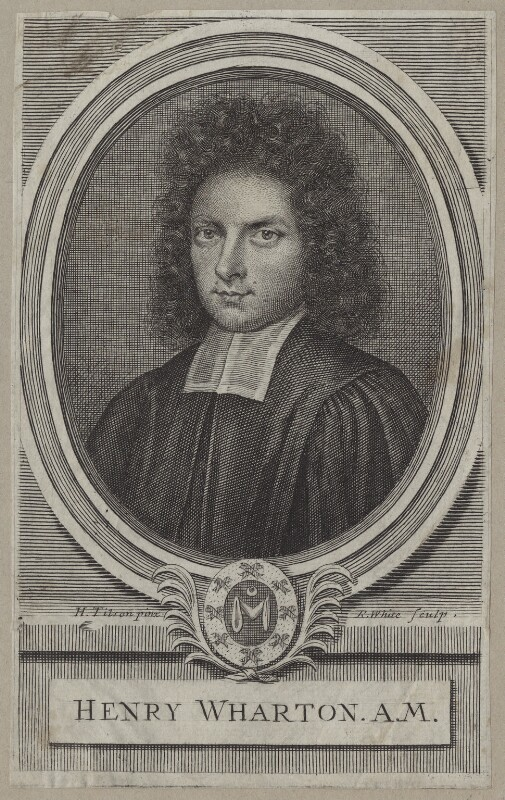
- Born: 9 November 1664
- Died: 5 March 1695
- Occupation: Historian

Henry Wharton (9 November 1664 – 5 March 1695) was an English writer and librarian.

== Life ==
Wharton was descended from Thomas, 2nd Baron Wharton (1520–1572), being a son of the Rev. Edmund Wharton, vicar of Worstead, Norfolk. Born at Worstead, he was educated by his father, and then at Gonville and Caius College, Cambridge. Both his industry and his talents were exceptional, and his university career was brilliant. In 1686 he entered the service of the ecclesiastical historian, the Rev. William Cave (1637–1713), whom he helped in his literary work; but considering that his assistance was not sufficiently appreciated he soon forsook this employment.

In 1687 he was ordained deacon, and in 1688 he made the acquaintance of the archbishop of Canterbury, William Sancroft, under whose generous patronage some of his literary work was done. The archbishop, who had a very high opinion of Wharton's character and talents, made him one of his chaplains, and presented him to the Kentish living of Sundridge, and afterwards to that of Chartham in the same county.

In 1689 he took the oath of allegiance to William III and Mary II, but he wrote a severe criticism of bishop Burnet's History of the Reformation, and it was partly owing to the bishop's hostility that he did not obtain further preferment in the English church. He died on 5 March 1695, and was buried in Westminster Abbey.

== Works ==
Wharton's major work is his Anglia Sacra, a collection of the lives of English archbishops and bishops, which was published in two volumes in 1691. Some of these were written by Wharton himself; others were borrowed from early writers. These include Stephen Birchington's Vitae Archiepiscoporum Cantuariensium.

His other writings, in addition to his criticism of the History of the Reformation, include A Treatise of the Celibacy of the Clergy (1688); The Enthusiasm of the Church of Rome Demonstrated in Some Observations upon the Life of Ignatius Loyola (1688); and A Defence of Pluralities (1692, new ed. 1703).

In Lambeth Palace Library there are sixteen volumes of Wharton's manuscripts. Describing him as "this wonderful man", William Stubbs says that Wharton did for the elucidation of English Church history "more than any one before or since". A life of Wharton is included in George D'Oyly's Life of William Sancroft (1821).

== Sources ==
- Okie, Laird. "Wharton, Henry (1664–1695)". Oxford Dictionary of National Biography (online ed.). Oxford University Press. doi:10.1093/ref:odnb/29167. (Subscription, Wikipedia Library access or UK public library membership required.)
