= Hugh Howard =

Hugh Howard may refer to:

- Hugh Howard (painter) (1675–1738), Irish portrait painter and art collector
- Hugh Howard (1731–1799), Irish MP
- Hugh Howard (1761–1840), Irish MP
- Hugh Howard (historian) (born 1952), American historian
- Hugh W. Howard, United States Navy admiral
