= Ralph Howard =

Ralph Howard may refer to:

- Ralph Howard, 7th Earl of Wicklow (1877–1946), Irish aristocrat and politician
- Ralph Howard, 1st Viscount Wicklow (1726–1786), Anglo-Irish politician and nobleman
- Sir Ralph Howard, 1st Baronet (1801–1873) of the Howard baronets
- Ralph Howard (politician) (1931–2013), Australian politician
- Ralph Anthony Howard, member of the Alabama House of Representatives
