= William Howard, 4th Earl of Wicklow =

Anglo-Irish peer

William Howard, 4th Earl of Wicklow KP (13 February 1788 – 22 March 1869) was an Anglo-Irish peer, styled Lord Clonmore from 1815 to 1818.

He was the eldest son of William Howard, 3rd Earl of Wicklow and Eleanor Caulfeild, and was known as William Forward, his father having assumed the surname of his mother, Alice Howard, 1st Countess of Wicklow, née Alice Forward. William Forward was appointed Colonel of the Wicklow Militia on 25 September 1810 in succession to his uncle, the Hon Hugh Howard. He retained the command until 1833.

He became Earl of Wicklow in 1818 on the death of his father, and on 10 November 1821 he was elected as an Irish representative peer, thus enabling him to sit in the House of Lords as a Tory. Between 1831 and his death he served as the first Lord Lieutenant of Wicklow, and he was appointed a Knight of the Order of St Patrick on 9 October 1846.

On 16 February 1816, he married Lady Cecil Frances Hamilton, the only child of John Hamilton, 1st Marquess of Abercorn by his second wife, Cecil Hamilton. He had no male issue, and was succeeded in his title by his nephew, Charles Howard.

Political offices
Preceded by The Lord Tyrawley	Representative peer for Ireland; 1821–1869	Succeeded by The Earl of Bantry
Honorary titles
New title Office created	Lord Lieutenant of Wicklow; 1831–1869	Succeeded by The 11th Earl of Meath
Preceded by The 10th Earl of Meath	Custos Rotulorum of County Wicklow; 1851–1869	Succeeded by The 11th Earl of Meath
Peerage of Ireland
Preceded by William Howard	Earl of Wicklow; 1818–1869	Succeeded by Charles Howard
