= Great Irish Households =

2022 book edited by Tessa Murdoch

Great Irish Households: Inventories from the Long Eighteenth Century
- Jacket showing a view of Carton House, County Kildare, by William van der Hagen,
- Authors: Tessa Murdoch (consultant editor): with inventories transcribed by Jessica Cunningham and Rebecca Campion; foreword by Toby Barnard; preface by Leslie Fitzpatrick; preambles by John Adamson, Rebecca Campion, Alec Cobbe, Jessica Cunningham and Edmund Joyce; appendices and indexes by John Adamson
- Cover artist: William van der Hagen
- Language: English
- Release number: 1st edition
- Subject: Social history, Material culture
- Published: Cambridge
- Publisher: John Adamson
- Publication date: 17 November 2022
- Publication place: United Kingdom
- Media type: Print
- Pages: 436
- ISBN: 978-1-898565-17-8
- OCLC: 1233305993
- Dewey Decimal: 728.80941509033
- Website: Book on publisher's website

Great Irish Households: Inventories from the Long Eighteenth Century presents in a single volume transcripts of inventories of fourteen great country houses, three Dublin town houses and one London town house, published as a tribute to the last Knight of Glin. (Note: Published as a companion volume to Noble Households: Eighteenth-Century Inventories of Great English Houses.) The inventories, all but two published for the first time, span the period from 1702, the year of William of Orange's death, to 1821, the year of George IV's coronation.

In 2003, Jane Fenlon, the historian of Irish art and architecture of the early modern period, had lamented the fact that inventories were a "rather neglected area of study" and had stressed how important it was that they "should not be treated as mere records of house furnishings" but "be seen as valuable research sources rich in information . . ." Regrettably, as Simon Swynfen Jervis's book British and Irish inventories bears out, there is still a dearth of Irish household inventories available in published form. By making more of them available in transcript, however, the book Great Irish Households has helped meet this acknowledged need.

== Structure ==
A preface by Leslie Fitzpatrick (Note: She was formerly the Samuel and M. Patricia Grober Associate Curator of European Decorative Arts, The Art Institute of Chicago and co-curated the exhibition Ireland: Crossroads of Art and Design, 1690–1840 held at the institute, 17 March – 21 June 2015.) and a foreword by Toby Barnard give a broad historical setting for the transcriptions. The inventories themselves, drawn up for probate or for a variety of other purposes by specialist appraisers together with family members or their staff, are given preambles by way of introduction to the houses and are supplemented with a glossary and indexes to personal names (Note: The index of personal names includes house owners as well as sitters in portraits, artists, makers and dealers.) and to the items listed. There are also appendices identifying the books listed in abridged form in inventories from three of the houses: at Kilkenny Castle, in the second Duchess of Ormonde's closet (1705); at the bishop's mansion house, Elphin, County Roscommon, in the study (1740); at Newbridge House, County Dublin, in the library (1821). (Note: As Toby Barnard remarks in his foreword, two out of the three listings had been assembled by bishops, "perhaps supporting the contention that the members of the Irish peerage and country gentry were not notably bookish" (see p. 14 of Great Irish Households).)

The inventories are grouped as follows:

Number	House	Location	Year	Notes
1	Lismore Castle	County Waterford	1702-03	(Note: This inventory was taken during the brief tenure of Charles Boyle, 2nd Earl of Burlington and 3rd Earl of Cork.)
2	Kilkenny Castle	County Kilkenny	1705	(Note: These were taken during James Butler's tenure as 2nd Duke of Ormonde.)
3	Dublin Castle	Dublin	1707	
4	The Duke of Ormonde's house	St James's Square, London	1710	
5	Bishop's Palace	Elphin, County Roscommon	1740	(Note: The inventories were drawn up on the death of Robert Howard, who was Church of Ireland bishop of Elphin.)
6	Captain Balfour's town house	Dublin	1741-42	auction sale (Note: Inventory previously published, without index to the items, in the Irish Ancestor in 1984 in a transcription by Rosemary ffolliott. Neither Captain Balfour nor his town house has been identified, but the original document is in the Townley Hall Papers at the National Library of Ireland, NLI MS 10,279. David Fleming in his review in Irish Architectural and Decorative Studies, 2022, vol. 25, p. 134, writes: '[T]his must have been Captain Harry Townley (1693–1741) of Piedmont, county Louth, who inherited his uncle's estates and changed his surname to Balfour'.)
7	Hillsborough Castle	County Down	1746 and 1777	(Note: Both inventories were drawn up for Wills Hill, 2nd Viscount Hillsborough (1742), later 1st Earl of Hillsborough (1751) and 1st Marquess of Downshire (1789).)
8	Kilrush House	Freshford, County Kilkenny	1750	(Note: Drawn up for Major-General Richard St George.)
9	9 and 10 Henrietta Street	Dublin	1772	Luke Gardiner's house (Note: This inventory lists and values goods and furniture at the house the year before it was sold by Sackville Gardner to his brother's son, Luke Gardiner (the younger), later 1st Viscount Mountjoy.)
10	Morristown Lattin	County Kildare	1773	(Note: Drawn up for probate on the death of George Lattin, the proprietor and member of a Roman Catholic family which had remained prosperous despite the rise of the Protestant ascendancy (see p. 165 of Great Irish Households).)
11	Baronscourt	County Kildare	1782	(Note: This inventory was drawn up for James Hamilton, 8th Earl of Abercorn.)
12	Castlecomer House	County Kilkenny	1798	(Note: Drawn up for Anne, Countess of Ormonde, to make a claim after the house was burnt down by rebels during the Irish Rebellion of 1798.)
13	Killadoon	County Kildare	1807-29	(Note: Inventories of 1807 overlaid with one of 1812 and of 1812 revised in 1829, all for Nathaniel Clements, 2nd Earl of Leitrim.)
14	Shelton Abbey	County Wicklow	1816	(Note: Inventory of furniture drawn up for William Howard, 3rd Earl of Wicklow.)
15	Borris House	County Carlow	1818	(Note: Inventory, compiled for probate on the death of Walter Kavanagh, was previously published, without index to the items, in Joyce 2013.)
16	Carton House	County Kildare	1818	(Note: The longest inventory published in the book, it was compiled for Augustus FitzGerald, 3rd Duke of Leinster shortly before his marriage to Lady Charlotte Augusta Stanhope. Adrian Tinniswood in his review of the book in the Critic remarks: "Great Irish Households is worth buying for the Carton House inventory alone.")
17	Newbridge House	County Dublin	1821	(Note: Drawn up for Charles Cobbe (1781–1867), great grandson of Archbishop Cobbe.)
18	Mount Stewart	County Down	1821	(Note: Created for Robert Stewart, 2nd Marquess of Londonderry (Lord Castlereagh).)

The end matter comprises:

- Glossary
- Appendix I: Sales by buyer at Captain Balfour's town house sale, 1741/2
- Appendix II: Books in the 2nd Duchess of Ormonde's closet at Kilkenny Castle, County Kilkenny, 1705
- Appendix III: Books in the bishop of Elphin's study, County Roscommon, 1740
- Appendix IV: Books in the library at Newbridge House, County Dublin, 1821
- List of inventory sources
- List of plates
- Bibliography
- Index of personal names
- General index

Other than Castlecomer House and the bishop's mansion house at Elphin, all the houses featured, some since modified, refashioned or rebuilt, are still standing to this day. Several of them are still the abodes of the same families.

== Illustrations ==
Among the plates in the book are portraits of owners of some of the houses, including:

- Charles Boyle, 2nd Earl of Burlington and 3rd Earl of Cork, detail of painting attributed to Michael Dahl
- James Butler, 2nd Duke of Ormonde, painting by Sir Godfrey Kneller
- Robert Howard, bishop of Elphin, mezzotint by John Brooks, after a painting by Michael Dahl
- Wills Hill, later 1st Marquess of Downshire, painting by Pompeo Batoni
- Major-General Richard St George, mezzotints by John Brooks after paintings by Francis Bindon and by Stephen Slaughter
- Luke Gardiner (the younger), later 1st Viscount Mountjoy, painting by Sir Joshua Reynolds
- James Hamilton, 8th Earl of Abercorn, painting by Thomas Gainsborough
- Susan Frances Elizabeth (Anne) Butler, Countess of Ormonde, painting by Hugh Douglas Hamilton
- Robert Clements, later 1st Earl of Leitrim, painting by Pompeo Batoni
- Ralph Howard, later 1st Viscount Wicklow, painting by Pompeo Batoni
- Augustus FitzGerald, 3rd Duke of Leinster, drawing by Gédéon Gaspard Alfred de Grimaud, comte d'Orsay
- Charles Cobbe (1781–1867), miniature in watercolour by Charles Robertson
- Robert Stewart, 2nd Marquess of Londonderry (Lord Castlereagh), painting by Sir Thomas Lawrence

== Book design ==
The book was designed by Philip Lewis, who chose to set the body in Rosart. This typeface is based on a type specimen by the type-founder Jacques-François Rosart, published in 1768.

== Critical reception ==
The historian and writer Adrian Tinniswood captures the essence of the book when in the Critic, he declares that it is "A box of geeky delights, certainly, but also a fabulous (one might even say indispensable) source for the scholarly study of the Irish country house . . ." He also alludes to the book's "excellent glossary, that essential component of published inventories", a view endorsed by Michael Hall in his review in the Times Literary Supplement.

Robert O'Byrne, the historian of Irish architecture and the decorative arts, reminds us in his review "Listed buildings" in Apollo that household inventories, Irish or otherwise, vary in what they include and what they omit. Such omissions hint at their "fascination and fallibility", he ventures, and goes on to say: "When it comes to country house contents, they provide us with a great deal of information, but rarely all of it". Nevertheless, across the inventories transcribed in the book, spanning some 120 years, he reassures us that "it is possible to see how the decoration and design of affluent Irish households changed".

Writing in Country Life, Kate Green sees historic household inventories that record the contents of rooms as "an essential documentary tool for understanding the use and appearance of houses in the distant past", and, for the benefit of those "with a serious interest in Irish Georgian houses", sees Great Irish Households as "an essential work of reference". The book's usefulness to researchers is likewise acknowledged by James Rothwell, National Curator, Decorative Arts, National Trust, who avers: "[This] will be an invaluable and rich source of information for scholars and I know I will be using it on a regular basis." These views are shared by Christopher Ridgway in the Journal of the History of Collections when he writes: "[T]his collection is a cornucopia of information, and while its primary audience will be scholars and curators, there is plenty to be gleaned from the listings for anyone interested in historic interiors". 'One of the things that make this volume incredibly useful,' asserts David Fleming in Irish Architectural and Decorative Studies, 'is the detailed, thematic index that draws each object together, allowing for comparison across the houses.' Marie Boran praises the general index in her review in Eighteenth-Century Ireland; "a mammoth undertaking," she dubs it, "as it includes an exhaustively detailed index to individual types of items within the inventories".

Whereas the architectural historian Peter Pearson, reviewing the book for the Irish Arts Review, admires the book, "a beautiful production — elegantly laid out, printed and bound into a neat volume, with a fine dust jacket", he wishes there was more information given about what became of the items listed. "Where are these objects now? Have any survived at all? Only occasionally are we told."

Drawing our attention to the fashion for mahogany in his review in the Furniture History Society Newsletter, Simon Swynfen Jervis writes: "[M]ahogany furniture occupies four columns of Great Irish Households' comprehensive, dense and detailed index, but this very emphasis serves to confirm the stock observation that this wood was particularly popular in well-to-do Irish houses."

Tom Jaine, writing in Petits Propos Culinaires, examines the kitchens and sculleries with especial delight. "There is so much information that recitation here would be exhausting, but for sheer extravagance, exuberance and breath-catching detail, the domestic and service sections of the Carton House inventory from 1818 take some beating . . ."

In her article about the book in the Irish Times, Bernice Harrison recognizes the usefulness of the transcribed inventories for artistic directors working on historical films. "It's not hard to see how a set designer on a film set in a grand 18th-century house would pore over the details in the book to find out how many paintings to put in the hall, whether there should be a rug on the floor and might it really be made of velvet . . . "

Nigel Hankin captures the essence of the book when he writes in the Georgian: "[T]his book gives a tantalising glimpse into the interiors of the home of the wealthy in Ireland in the period and provides an invaluable resource for serious study of Irish Georgian houses". Admiring the book's success in achieving its overall aim, William Derham, curator at Dublin Castle, foresees that it "will be the go-to source book on material culture in the great Irish house, above and below stairs, for many years to come".

== See also ==
- Sales of Irish country house contents

== Bibliography ==
- Fenlon, Jane. Goods & Chattels: A Survey of Early Household Inventories in Ireland, Kilkenny, Heritage Council, Stationery Office, 2003 ISBN 978-0-7557-1778-1 OCLC 57212552
- ffolliott, Rosemary. "Captain Balfour's auction, 15th March 1741–2", The Irish Ancestor, vol. XVI, no. 1 (1984), pp. 21–31
- Jervis, Simon Swynfen. British and Irish Inventories: A List and Bibliography of Published Transcriptions of Secular Inventories. Leeds, Furniture History Society, 2010 ISBN 978-0-903335-15-7 OCLC 715291123
- Joyce, Edmund. Borris House, Co. Carlow, and Elite Regency Patronage, Maynooth studies in local history, no. 108. Dublin, Four Courts Press, 2013 ISBN 978-1-84682-404-3 OCLC 827974018
