= William Forward =

Irish politician

William Forward MP, of Castle Forward, Newtown Cunningham, County Donegal, was an MP in the Irish Parliament for St. Johnstown Constituency, County Donegal. Colonel William Forward was married to Isabella Stewart (granddaughter of Bart. William Stewart), and had one daughter, Alice. His daughter Alice married Viscount Wicklow Ralph Howard, and became Countess of Wicklow. The Forwards owned 6,000 acres in the barony of Raphoe, County Donegal, which passed on to Alice and the Earls of Wicklow.

Williams father Lieutenant Colonel John Forward, was High Sheriff of Donegal, had also served in the Irish House of Commons for the St. Johnstown Constituency, and was involved in the Siege of Londonderry, and his mother was Anne Forward, and Lieutenant Colonel John Forward's grandfather Rev. Robert Forward was dean of Dromore.

Forward in 1722 built the All Saints Church, Newtown Cunningham, as the family chapel, the church includes a number of monuments to the Forward family, including William Forward's grave.

William Forward served from 1715 until 1768, and died in Bath, in 1770.
