= Cecil Howard, 6th Earl of Wicklow =

Anglo-Irish British Army officer and peer

Cecil Ralph Howard, 6th Earl of Wicklow (26 April 1842 – 24 July 1891) was an Anglo-Irish British Army officer and peer.

== Early life ==
He was a younger son of the Rev. Hon. Francis Howard, Vicar of Swords, County Dublin (the son of William Howard, 3rd Earl of Wicklow), and his second wife Sarah Hamilton.

== Career ==
In 1864 he was commissioned as an ensign in the King's Royal Rifle Corps, and was promoted to lieutenant in 1867 and to captain in 1876. After his elder brother succeeded to the earldom he was granted the style and precedence of the younger son of an earl by Royal Warrant in 1870. He retired from the regular army in 1877, but joined the Antrim Artillery Militia as a captain in 1879 and was later promoted to major in the Wicklow Artillery Militia on 23 February 1881. He retired on 8 August 1884.

He succeeded his brother, Charles Howard as Earl of Wicklow on 20 June 1881. On 23 January 1888, he was elected as an Irish representative peer and took his seat in the House of Lords.

== Personal life ==
He was twice married. His first marriage was on 23 March 1876 to Francesca Maria Chamberlayne (d. 1877), a daughter of Thomas Chamberlayne. Before her death on 30 December 1877, they were the parents of one son:

- Ralph Howard, 7th Earl of Wicklow (1877–1946), who married Lady Gladys Mary Hamilton, daughter of James Hamilton, 2nd Duke of Abercorn and Lady Mary Anna Curzon (a daughter of the 1st Earl Howe), in 1902. After her death, he married Lady Beatrix Frances Gertrude Herbert, daughter of Sidney Herbert, 14th Earl of Pembroke and Lady Beatrix Louisa Lambton (a daughter of the 2nd Earl of Durham), in 1942.

Howard remarried on 2 June 1880 to Fanny Catherine Wingfield, the daughter of Richard Robert Wingfield and Fanny Castle (a daughter of Michael Hinton Castle). Together, they were the parents of two further sons:

- Hon. Cecil Mervyn Malcolm Howard (1881–1882), who died young.
- Hon. Hugh Melville Howard (1883–1919), who married American heiress Mary Emily "May" Sands, daughter of Benjamin Aymar Sands, in 1908.

Lord Wicklow died on 24 July 1891 and was succeeded by his eldest son from his first marriage, Ralph. After his death, his widow married Marcus Francis Beresford, son of Maj. Henry Marcus Beresford and brother to George Charles Beresford, on 10 April 1894.

Political offices
Preceded by The Viscount Lifford	Representative peer for Ireland; 1888–1891	Succeeded by The Lord Dunalley
Peerage of Ireland
Preceded by Charles Howard	Earl of Wicklow; 1881–1891	Succeeded by Ralph Howard
