= Howard Mausoleum =

Tomb at Kilbride, County Wicklow, Ireland

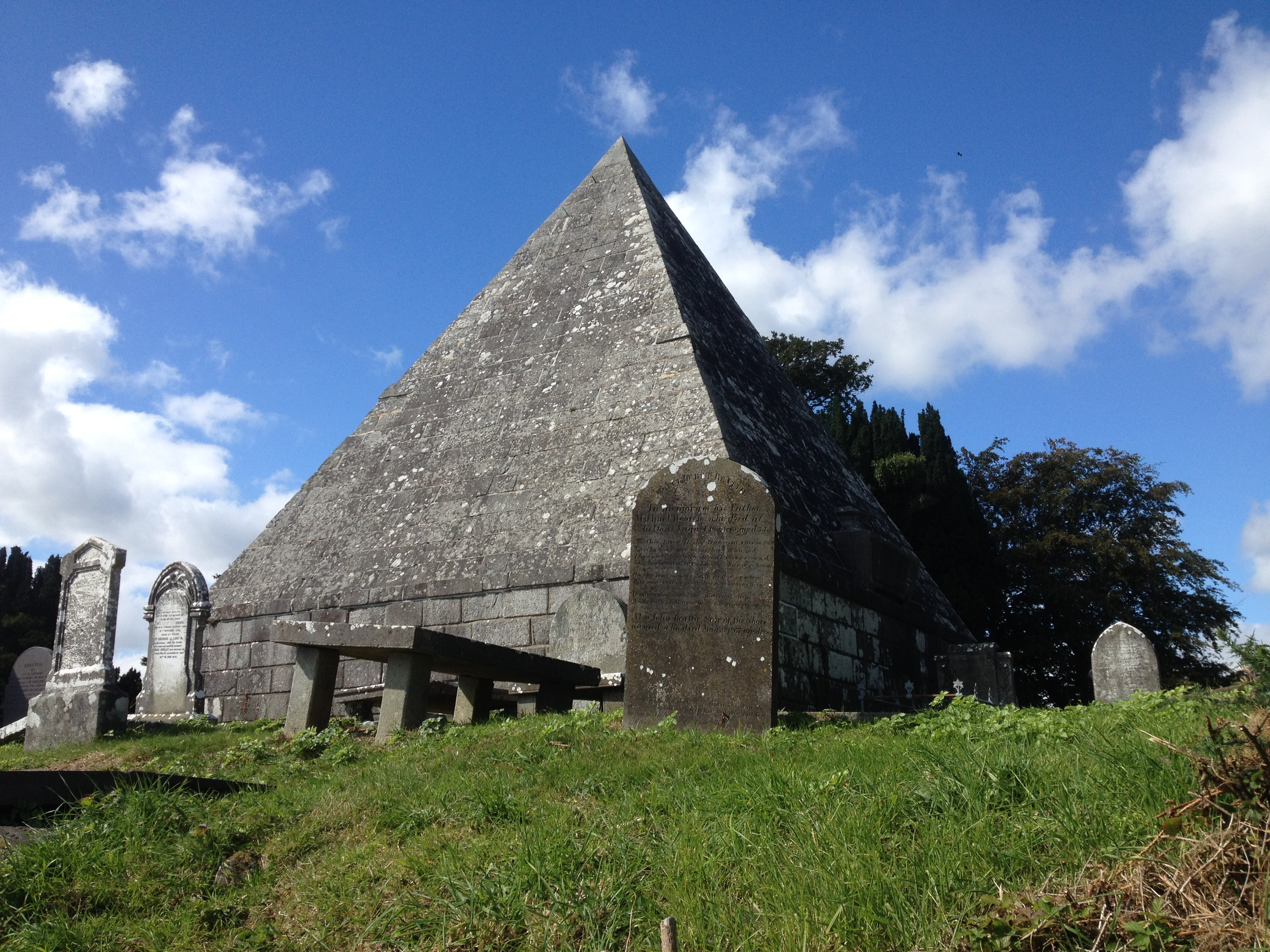

- Location within Ireland

General information
- Status: Mausoleum
- Type: Mausoleum
- Location: County Wicklow, Ireland, Ireland
- Coordinates: 52.811986°N 6.163042°W
- Construction started: 1785
- Owner: Ralph Howard, 1st Viscount Wicklow

Design and construction
- Architect: Simon Vierpyl

Howard Mausoleum was erected in County Wicklow, Ireland, commissioned in 1785, for the first Viscount of Wicklow, Ralph Howard. The architect is believed to have been Simon Vierpyl.

== History ==
The granite mausoleum was built to house the remains of the Howard family near Shelton Abbey, close to Arklow in County Wicklow. Until as recently as 2001 it was at significant risk due to neglect. However it is now being restored by the Arklow Marine and Heritage Committee with TÚS.

The first burial to take place there was Isabella Howard, the Vicount's daughter who died at nineteen in December 1784, a year before the pyramid was built. The last burial is recorded as 1823. The tomb was designed to hold 33 people but only 18 were actually interred within it. There is a local ghost story of the body of an infant being interred in the monument which cried at night until taken and reburied elsewhere. The tomb was then silent.

In writing about the location John Betjeman described it as the largest pyramid tomb ‘beyond the banks of the Nile’.

There is a second tomb housing another branch of the family, often mistaken for part of the pyramid. It is an Egyptian-style temple fronted building.
