= Ralph Howard, 7th Earl of Wicklow =

Irish aristocrat and politician (1877–1946)

The Right Honourable The Earl of Wicklow
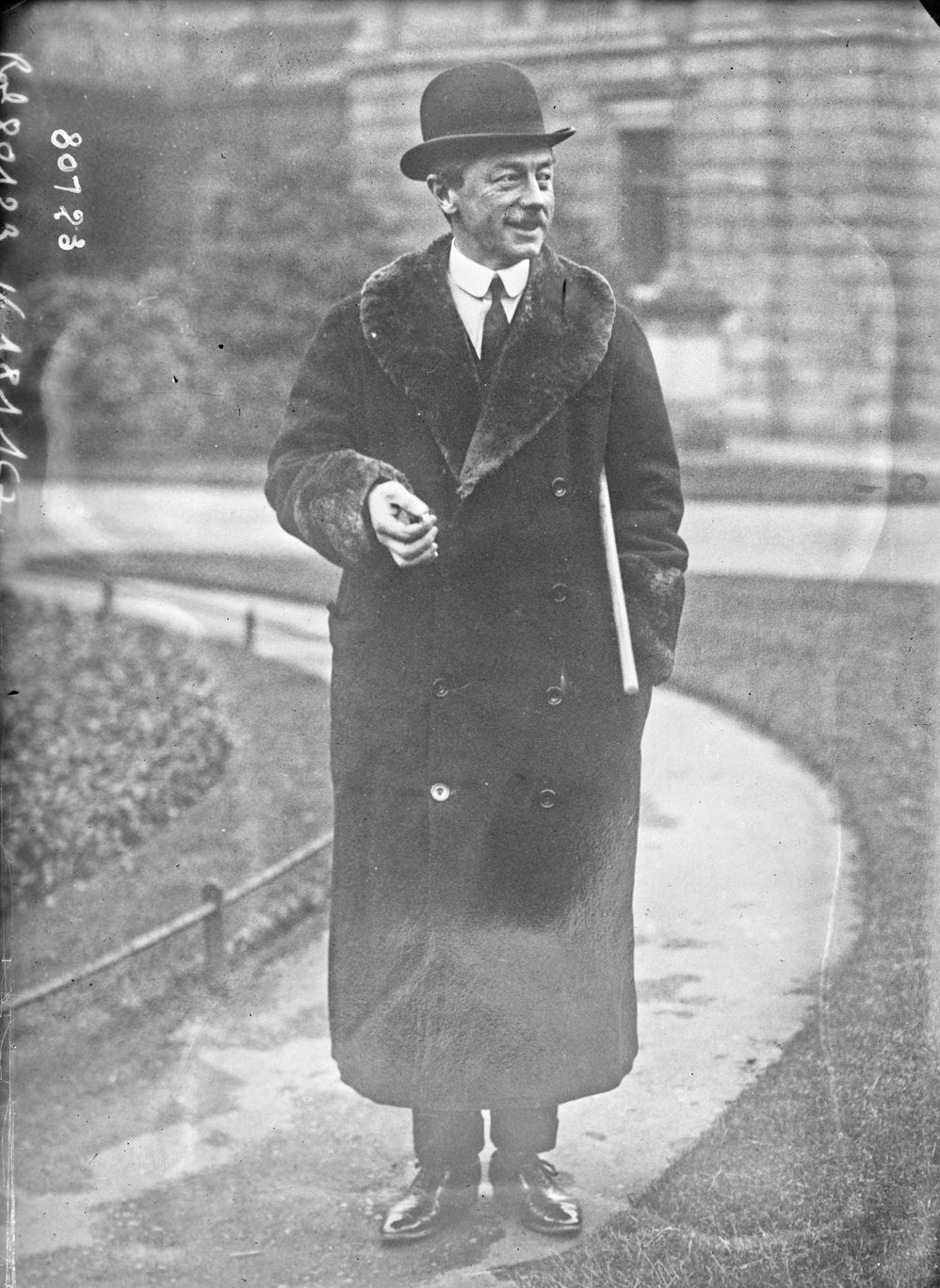
- Howard in 1922

Senator
- In office 11 December 1922 – 12 December 1928

Personal details
- Born: Ralph Francis Howard; 24 December 1877
- Died: 11 October 1946 (aged 68) County Wicklow, Ireland
- Spouses: Lady Gladys Hamilton (m. 1902; died 1917); Lady Beatrix Herbert (m. 1942; died 1946)
- Children: William Howard
- Parents: Cecil Howard (father); Francesca Maria Chamberlayne (mother)
- Relatives: Thomas Chamberlayne (grandfather)

Ralph Francis Howard, 7th Earl of Wicklow (24 December 1877 – 11 October 1946) was an Irish aristocrat and politician.

== Early life ==
Howard was the son of Cecil Howard, 6th Earl of Wicklow and Francesca Maria Chamberlayne. After his mother died in 1877, his father married Fanny Catherine Wingfield, the daughter of Richard Robert Wingfield. From this marriage, he had two younger half-brothers, Hon. Cecil Mervyn Malcolm Howard, who died young, and Hon. Hugh Melville Howard, who married American heiress Mary Emily "May" Sands (a daughter of Benjamin Aymar Sands).

His paternal grandparents were the Rev. Hon. Francis Howard, Vicar of Swords, County Dublin (the son of the 3rd Earl of Wicklow), and his second wife Sarah Hamilton. His maternal grandparents were Thomas Chamberlayne and Amelia Onslow (a daughter of Gen. Denzil Onslow).

== Career ==
He succeeded as Earl of Wicklow on the death of his father in 1891.

Lord Wicklow was commissioned a second-lieutenant in the 2nd Life Guards on 16 February 1898, promoted to lieutenant on 26 April 1899, and saw active service in South Africa from 1899 to 1900 during the Second Boer War. A squadron from the 2nd Life Guards was attached to the Household Cavalry Regiment during the war, and Lord Wicklow served as Brigade Signalling Officer, and received the Queen's South Africa Medal with three clasps. After his return to the United Kingdom, he was promoted to captain on 3 September 1902.

In 1922, he was nominated by W. T. Cosgrave to the Seanad Éireann of the Irish Free State on its formation. He served for six years until he was defeated at the 1928 Seanad election.

== Personal life ==
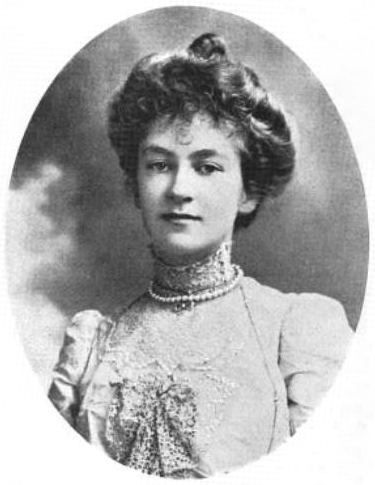
Lady Gladys Hamilton in 1902

On 14 January 1902 at St. Mark's Church, North Audley Street, London, Lord Wicklow was married to Lady Gladys Mary Hamilton (1880–1917), a daughter of James Hamilton, 2nd Duke of Abercorn and Lady Mary Anna Curzon-Howe. As the couple were both prominent and visible members of Anglo-Irish society, the bride received valuable presents from several public bodies in Ireland, and the ceremony was performed by the Archbishop of Armagh (Primate of All Ireland). Before her death in 1917, they were the parents of one son:

- William Cecil James Philip John Paul Howard, 8th Earl of Wicklow (1902–1978), who married Eleanor Butler, an architect who had been a member of Seanad Éireann between 1948 and 1951, in 1959.

After his brother died in 1919 and his sister-in-law had to be institutionalised after developing psychological problems, Wicklow took in his niece, Katharine Frances Theodosia Howard (1910–1990), and nephew, Cecil Aymar Howard (later the 9th Earl of Wicklow, at his estate, Shelton Abbey.

Late in Lord Wicklow's life he remarried, in 1942, to Lady Beatrix Francis Gertrude (née Herbert) Wilkinson (1878–1957). The daughter of Sidney Herbert, 14th Earl of Pembroke and Lady Beatrix Louisa Lambton (the eldest daughter of the 2nd Earl of Durham), she was the widow of Maj. Sir Nevile Rodwell Wilkinson, who had died in 1940.

Lord Wicklow died in County Wicklow, Ireland on 11 October 1946, and was succeeded in his titles by his only son, William. His widow died on 3 December 1957. Upon his son's death, without issue, in 1978, the earldom passed to the 7th Earl's nephew, Cecil Aymar Howard. When the 8th Earl died in 1983, the title became extinct.

Peerage of Ireland
Preceded by Cecil Howard	Earl of Wicklow; 1891–1946	Succeeded by William Howard
Political offices
Preceded by The Earl of Lanesborough	Representative peer for Ireland; 1905–1946	Office lapsed
