= Hugh Howard (painter) =

Irish painter (1675–1737)

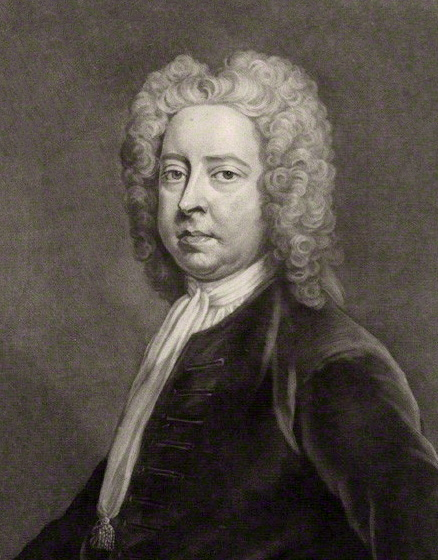
A 1737 engraving in mezzo-tint by John Faber the Younger based on a portrait by Michael Dahl dating from 1723.

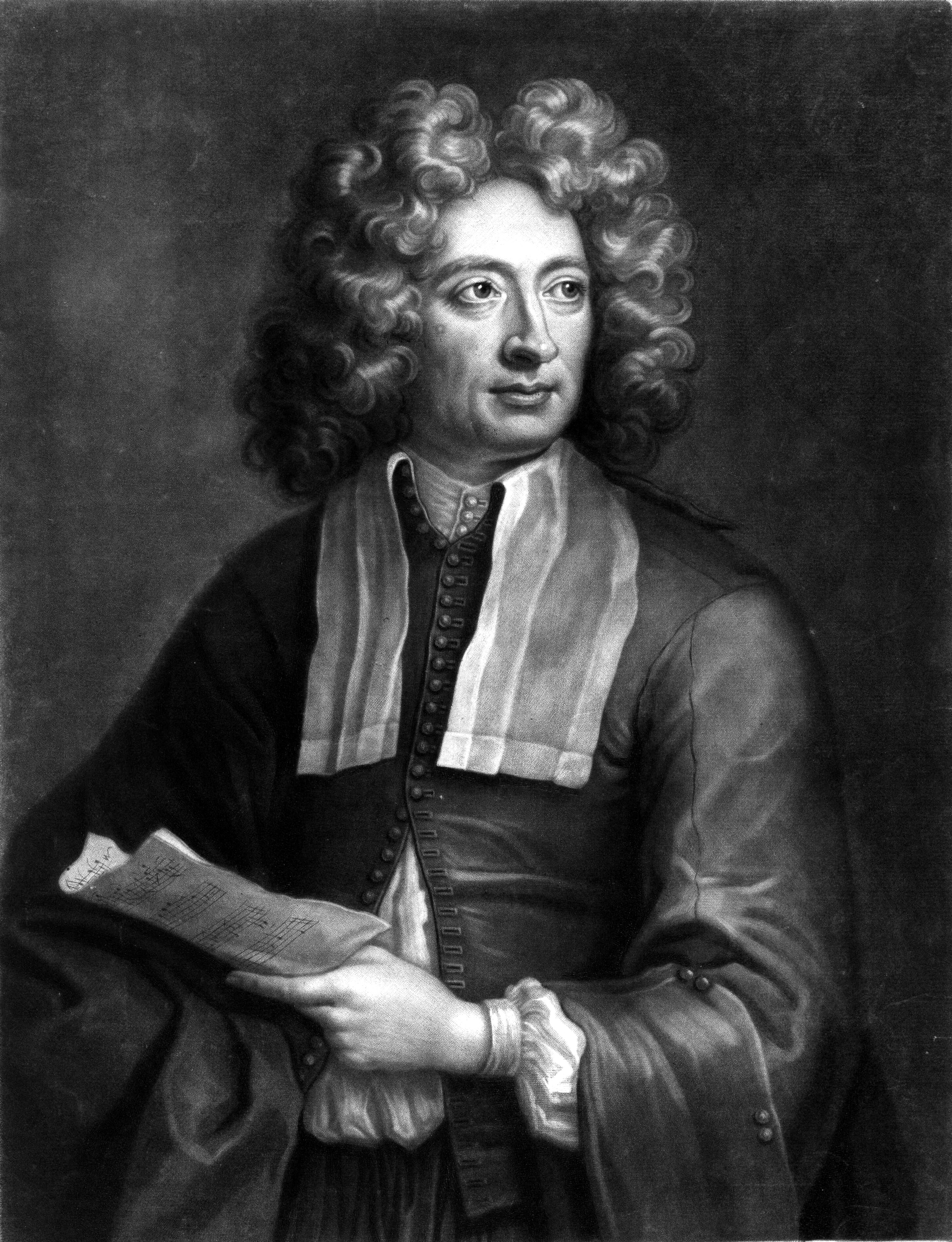
An engraving based on Howard's "masterpiece" of Arcangelo Corelli.

Hugh Howard (7 February 1675 – 17 March 1737) was a portrait-painter and collector of works of art from Dublin.

== Biography ==
Hugh Howard was born in Dublin on 7 February 1675. He was the eldest son of Ralph Howard of Shelton, county Wicklow. He came with his father to England in 1688, and showing a taste for painting joined in 1697 the suite of Thomas Herbert, eighth earl of Pembroke, one of the plenipotentiaries for the treaty of Ryswyck, on a journey through Holland to Italy.

Howard remained in Italy about three years studying with Carlo Maratti who has been described as the last painter in the Raphael tradition. Howard returning to the British Isles in October 1700 and he then resided in Dublin. Howard settled in London eventually, where he practised for some time as a portrait-painter. Howard was appointed to the sinecure post of keeper of the state papers, and then paymaster of the works belonging to the crown. He was thus enabled to relinquish painting as a profession. Howard was an exceptional student of the arts and he was to find a new application for his training.

He was elected a Fellow of the Royal Society in November, 1696.

== Art collecting ==
The salaries of his new jobs combined with his private income far outweighed his costs, and Howard invested in purchasing works of art: medals, drawings and prints. He also bought from the collections of Sir Peter Lely and the Earl of Arundel. Of note with regard to his finances was his marriage in 1714 to Thomasine, heiress to General Thomas Langston.

Howard executed a few etchings, including one of Padre Resta, the collector; twenty-one drawings by him, including a portrait of Cardinal Albani, and some caricatures, are in the print room in the British Museum. Matthew Prior wrote a poem in his honour. Howard died in Pall Mall 17 March 1737, and was buried in the church at Richmond, Surrey. Howard inherited in 1728 part of Lord Chancellor West's library from his younger brother, William Howard, M.P. for Dublin. He left his collections to his only surviving brother, Robert Howard, Bishop of Elphin, who had them transported to Ireland. They remained in the possession of the latter's descendants, the Earls of Wicklow, until December 1873, when the fifth Earl sold the collection of prints and drawings. 1,488 prints of the eighteenth and seventeenth centuries found their way in 1874 into the British Museum's collection.
