= Militia Artillery units of the United Kingdom and Colonies =

The Militia Artillery
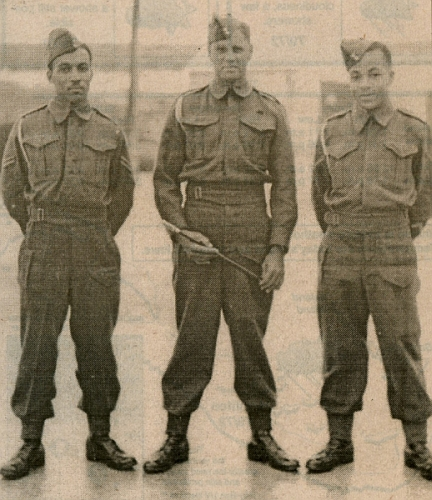
- Warrant Officer and NCOs of the Bermuda Militia Artillery at St. David's Battery, Bermuda, ca. 1944.
- Country: (United Kingdom British Empire)
- Branch: British Army
- Type: Coastal artillery

The Militia Artillery units of the United Kingdom and Colonies (including Canada, New Brunswick, Nova Scotia, Newfoundland, Australia, New Zealand, and South Africa prior to their attaining dominion status) were military reserve units made up of volunteers who served part-time during peacetime, training to take over responsibility for manning fixed artillery batteries from the regular Royal Artillery during times of war.

Most of these batteries were of coastal artillery positioned to guard ports, naval bases, and coastal locations likely to be used by an enemy to land invading forces, or were designed to protect coastal batteries from overland attacks by infantry. A single militia artillery unit, the Lancashire Royal Field Artillery, was also created in the United Kingdom as field artillery, equipped with mobile guns.

== History ==
=== Early history ===
With the increasing importance of artillery defences by the mid-Nineteenth century (and the usual reluctance of the British Government to fund an expansion of the regular military forces), a military reserve artillery force became a pressing concern to aid in maintaining the fixed defensive batteries (the units tasked with these duties were referred to either as garrison artillery or coastal artillery). Through the Eighteenth Century, and up to the end of the Napoleonic Wars and the American War of 1812, the military reserve forces that supported (but were not part of either) the British Army and the Board of Ordnance Military Corps (which included the Royal Artillery, the Royal Engineers, and the Royal Sappers and Miners) included the Militia (which was normally an all-infantry force), and the mounted Yeomanry. During wartime, these were supplemented by Volunteer units that were normally disbanded with peace. Royal Artillery coastal batteries were often brought up to strength with drafts from the British Army or the militia, or by temporarily re-tasking militia units or raising volunteer artillery corps. In Bermuda, from the Seventeenth Century until after the American War of 1812, men with status and the required funds were appointed as Captains of forts (which spared them from any obligation to serve in the Militia), in command of fortified coastal batteries manned by volunteers through peace and war.

=== Reorganisation ===
In 1852, with fear of an invasion of Britain by France, the reserve forces were re-organised. The Militia, which had become a paper tiger, changed from a conscripted force to one in which recruits voluntarily engaged for a term of service. It also ceased to be an all-infantry force. As the most critical shortage was of garrison artillery, a number of Militia Infantry regiments were re-tasked as Militia Artillery, and new militia units were also raised as artillery. The Militia Artillery units, which (like other reserve units) were raised under the Lords-Lieutenants of counties, who appointed officers), and were all tasked with garrison duties at fixed batteries. The invasion scare also led to the re-establishment of the Volunteer Force as a permanent (though only part-time, except when embodied for emergencies) branch of the British military. This force (which differed from the Militia primarily in that its volunteers did not engage for a term of service, and might quit with fourteen days notice, except while embodied) contained a mixture of artillery, engineering and infantry units. Similar militia and Volunteer units were also raised in various British colonies.

During the latter half of the Nineteenth Century, the military forces were re-organised through a succession of reforms, with the Board of Ordnance abolished after the Crimean War. Its military corps, including the Royal Artillery, as well as its civilian Commissariat, transport and stores organs were absorbed into the British Army. The Militia and the Volunteer Force units were more closely integrated with the British Army, though remaining separate forces.

In 1882, the Militia Artillery units lost their individual identities, becoming numbered brigades organised within Royal Artillery territorial divisions, of which the British Isles were divided into eleven. In 1889 the number of divisions was reduced to three, and the Militia Artillery brigades were renamed again, mostly regaining some variation of their original territorial names.

The Home (i.e., British Isles) Militia Artillery collectively had constituted a Corps of Militia Artillery, within which units had been numbered in order-of-precedence until 1882. The Home Militia as a whole also formed a numbered Corps of the British Army in the Twentieth Century. Separately from the Home Militia, Militia units of Bermuda, Malta and the Channel Islands were numbered together also on the British Army order-of-precedence of corps (amongst themselves, they were ordered in accordance with the precedence of their parent corps). Other colonial Militia Artillery units not funded by the War Office were considered auxiliary forces and did not appear on the British Army order-of-precedence (making them British military units, but not part of the British military force titled the British Army, nor constituting separate armies or parts of separate armies).

=== Disbanding ===
When the Volunteer Force and the Yeomanry in the United Kingdom were merged to create the Territorial Force in 1908, the Militia was redesignated the Special Reserve. At the same time, plans were made to convert all of the Royal Garrison Artillery (Militia) units to Royal Field Artillery, but all were instead disbanded (although Militia Artillery units remained in some of the colonies, and these were not redesignated as Special Reserve. The most notable of these was the Bermuda Militia Artillery, which, like the Bermuda Volunteer Rifle Corps, formed part of the garrison of the important Imperial Fortress colony of Bermuda). The remainder of the Special Reserve was redesignated as the Militia again after the First World War and permanently suspended.

== Ranks and insignia ==
Prior to 1882, each Militia Artillery unit in the United Kingdom wore a unique badge. Between 1882 and 1889, Militia Artillery brigades wore a divisional badge based on that of the Royal Artillery, except that the lower scroll and upper scroll, which on the Royal Artillery badge were inscribed "Quo Fas Et Gloria Ducunt" and "Ubique" (which indicated the regular Royal Artillery, like the Royal Engineers, served everywhere), were respectively inscribed with the name of the territorial division name (by example, North Irish Division) and left blank or covered in a spray of laurel (as the Militia and Volunteer Force were both home defence forces, the members of which could not be sent abroad on expedition without their consents). From 1889 to 1902, the lower scroll was inscribed with the name of the unit (by example, Antrim Artillery) and the upper scroll left blank or covered in a spray of laurel. Grenade badges, whether worn as a collar badge or elsewhere, lacked the scroll inscribed "Ubique" that was part of the regular Royal Artillery version.

Militia Artillery units were made up of Militia officers and other ranks, with a Permanent Staff made up of seconded Royal Artillery officers and senior other ranks, including a single officer acting as both Commandant and Adjutant (where a suitably qualified Militia officer was unavailable to serve as Commandant), or only as Adjutant where the Commandant was a Militia officer.

Following the separation of the garrison companies from the Royal Artillery into the Royal Garrison Artillery in 1899, the Militia Artillery units were re-titled accordingly in 1902 (by example, The Antrim Royal Garrison Artillery (Militia), which would usually be rendered Antrim R.G.A (M)). The badge adopted was the same as that of the regular Royal Regiment of Artillery, including the "ubique" and "Quo Fas Et Gloria Ducunt" scrolls, with a letter "M" fixed at the bottom of the gun badge, and on the body of the grenade on the grenade badge (also with the "ubique" scroll), whether worn on the collar or on a cap. Alternately, Ubique was replaced on scrolls with the name of the city, county or colony for which the unit was named.

== List of Militia Artillery units ==
Militia Artillery units of the United Kingdom and Colonies
Order of Precedence (Home)	Original Name	Date formed or converted	Territory	1882 Name and Royal Artillery Division	1889 Name and Royal Artillery Division	1902 Name (following 1899 separation of Royal Garrison Artillery)	1909 Fate (after 1908 re-designation of Home Militia as Special Reserve)	1919 Fate (Special Reserve renamed Militia and permanently suspended)	1956 Fate (on abolition of coastal artillery)	Embodiments and service
1	Antrim Militia Artillery	November 1854 (new)	County Antrim	2nd Brigade, North Irish Division, Royal Artillery	The Antrim Artillery (Southern Division)	The Antrim Royal Garrison Artillery (Militia)	Retained as Royal Garrison Artillery (Special Reserve) in 1908	Demobilised with the Special Reserve. Re-formed 1939 as 188 (Antrim) Heavy Battery RA (TA). 1940 expanded to Antrim Heavy Regiment RA (TA). 1945 re-designated 525 (Antrim) Coast Regiment RA. 1947 re-designated 429 (Antrim) Coast Regiment RA (TA)	Converted to engineers as 74 (Antrim Artillery) Engineer Regiment (V)	Crimean War 27/12/1854 - 21/05/1856; Indian Mutiny 05/04/1859-28/02/1861; Second Boer War 08/05/1900-06/11/1900 (5 officers and 153 other ranks volunteered for service in South Africa as a service company, embarking in March 1900 and brigaded with the service company of the Donegal RGA (M). The brigade departed South Africa in June, 1901. First World War 1914-1919
30	Argyll and Bute Militia Artillery	1861 (Converted: Previously The Argyllshire Regiment of Militia (1798-1802); The Argyll and Bute Regiment of Militia (1802-1861))	Argyll and Bute (from 1895, also Lanarkshire and Renfrewshire)	The 6th Brigade, Scottish Division, Royal Artillery	The Argyll and Bute Artillery (Southern Division, Royal Artillery); Changed in 1895 to The West of Scotland Artillery	The West of Scotland Royal Garrison Artillery (Militia)	Transferred to Special Reserve Royal Field Artillery in 1908 and disbanded in 1909	N/A	N/A	Second Boer War 08/05/1900-03/10-1900
2	Armagh Artillery (amalgamated 1875 with the Londonderry Artillery and Tyrone Artillery to form The Mid-Ulster Regiment of Artillery Militia)	1854 (New)	Armagh (from 1875: Armagh; County Londonderry; County Tyrone)	The 6th Brigade, North Irish Division, Royal Artillery	Mid-Ulster Artillery (Southern Division, Royal Artillery)	The Mid-Ulster Royal Garrison Artillery (Militia)	Transferred to Special Reserve Royal Field Artillery in 1908 and disbanded in 1909	N/A	N/A	Crimean War April 1855-July 185; Second Boer War 03/05/1900-06/11/1900
N/A	Bermuda Militia Artillery	1895 (New)	Bermuda	N/A	N/A	Not renamed	Retained as garrison artillery	Retained. Disembodied on end of First World War, but reformed for 1921 annual training. 1928 re-organised on Territorial Army lines (but not organisationally part of the Territorial Army), taking over most artillery duties of the Bermuda Garrison on the withdrawal of regular company. Reduced to Permanent Staff from 1946 to 1951. Re-established as a single battery of 200 all ranks in 1951. Converted to infantry role in 1953 on closure of St. David's Battery, but retained identity and continued to be badged as Royal Artillery.	Retained as infantry, still badged as Royal Artillery. Amalgamated in 1965 with Bermuda Rifles to form the Bermuda Regiment (since 2015, the Royal Bermuda Regiment)	First World War; Second World War; Already embodied for annual training on declaration of First World War. Remained embodied for duration. Two contingents sent to Western Front as Bermuda Contingent of the Royal Garrison Artillery. Embodied for duration of Second World War, manning two coastal batteries (St. David's Battery and Warwick Camp Battery). One officer attached to June 1940 Bermuda Volunteer Rifle Corps contingent to the Lincolnshire Regiment for transit to England and given temporary regular Royal Artillery commission. Served in coastal artillery in Sierra Leone. Transferred to Lincolnshire Regiment and served in North West Europe, then as Press Officer in charge of German press industry in British Area of Occupation of Germany. Two other officers received temporary regular Royal Artillery commissions and served as AOP pilots in Italy and the Far East. Volunteers detached in 1943 to a joint Bermuda Militia Artillery-Bermuda Militia Infantry overseas service contingent, trained in Bermuda as infantry for the European Theatre of Operations, then providing the training cadre of the new Caribbean Regiment formed in the United States of America, and thereafter serving as part of that regiment in Italy, North Africa and Palestine. The contingent returned to Bermuda in 1946, where members returned to their original units. Other members of the Bermuda Militia Artillery volunteered to transfer to the Royal Air Force (either first training at the Bermuda Flying School while serving in the Bermuda Militia Artillery, or transferring to the Royal Air Force prior to training for their new roles), serving as air and ground crew.
3	Berwickshire, Haddington, Linlithgow and Peebles Artillery Militia, changed in 1858 to Haddington, Berwickshire, Linlithgow and Peebles Artillery Militia	1854 from Berwickshire, Haddington, Linlithgow and Peebles Militia	Berwickshire, Haddingtonshire, Linlithgowshire and Peeblesshire; Widened in 1894 to South-East of Scotland	2nd Brigade, Scottish Division, Royal Artillery	The Haddington Artillery (Southern Division, Royal Artillery); Changed in 1894 to The South-East of Scotland Artillery)	The South-East of Scotland Royal Garrison Artillery (Militia)	Transferred to Special Reserve Royal Field Artillery in 1908 and disbanded in 1909	N/A	N/A	Crimean War 02/1855-08/1856; Second Boer War 15/05/1900-05/10/1900
N/A	British Guiana Militia Artillery	1902	British Guiana				Disbanded in 1948	N/A	N/A	
N/A	Cape Garrison Artillery	1889 (Converted: Cape Town Volunteer Engineers was formed in 1879, adding a coastal artillery company in 1889, with the title changing to Garrison Artillery & Engineer Volunteer Corps, then Cape Garrison Artillery in 1896 when Engineering was discontinued. It ceased to be a volunteer unit when it became partially-paid in 1898)	Cape Town; Simonstown	N/A	N/A	Not renamed	Retained as garrison artillery	Defence of Cape Town and Simonstown handed to the Union of South Africa in 1920	N/A	Second Boer War (?); First World War; Heavy Batteries formed for service in France and Flanders during First World War
33	Royal Cardigan Artillery	1877 (Converted: Previously raised in 1644 by Colonel John Jones; regimented as The Cardiganshire Regiment of Militia (1762-1804); The Royal Cardiganshire Militia (1804-1861); (Having become light infantry in 1810 and a rifle regiment in 1812) amalgamated with the Brecknockshire and Radnorshire Militia to form the Royal Cardigan, Brecknock & Radnor Rifle Corps (1861-1867); and the Royal Cardigan Rifle Corps (1867-1877)	Cardiganshire	5th Brigade, Welsh Division, Royal Artillery	The Cardigan Artillery (Western Division, Royal Artillery)	The Cardigan Royal Garrison Artillery (Militia)	Transferred to Special Reserve Royal Field Artillery in 1908 and disbanded in 1909	N/A	N/A	Second Boer War 02/05/1900-05/10/1900; Two officers served in South Africa attached to 15th Company, Western Division RGA
24	Royal Carmarthen Artillery	1867 (Converted: Previously The Carmarthen Militia (1763-1799); The Royal Carmarthen Militia (1799-1803); The Royal Carmarthen Fusiliers (1803-1852); The Royal Carmarthen Rifle Regiment (1852-1861); Amalgamated with the Royal Pembrokeshire Artillery Regiment of Militia (retaining 24 in order-of-precedence from The Royal Pembrokeshire Artillery Regiment of Militia) to form The Royal Carmarthen & Pembroke Artillery (1861-1867); separated as The Royal Carmarthen Artillery, with The Royal Pembrokeshire Artillery renumbered 31, while The Royal Carmarthen Artillery retaining 24 in order-of-precedence (1867-1882)	Carmarthen	3rd Brigade, Welsh Division, Royal Artillery	The Carmarthen Artillery (Western Division, Royal Artillery)	The Carmarthen Royal Garrison Artillery (Militia)	Transferred to Special Reserve Royal Field Artillery in 1908 and disbanded in 1909	N/A	N/A	Second Boer War 03/05/1900-06/10/1900
N/A	Ceylon Garrison Artillery	1888 (New)	Sri Lanka (formerly Ceylon)	N/A	Not renamed	Not renamed	Retained as garrison artillery			
N/A	Royal Alderney Artillery (Channel Islands Militia)	1881 (Converted: re-organised as garrison artillery)	Jersey	N/A	N/A	N/A	Retained	Retained. Disbanded 1929 (when Channel Islands coastal artillery battalions were closed)	N/A	
N/A	Royal Guernsey Artillery (Channel Islands Militia)	1881 (Converted: re-organised as garrison artillery)	Guernsey	N/A	N/A	N/A	Retained	Retained. Disbanded 1929 (when Channel Islands coastal artillery battalions were closed)	N/A	
N/A	Royal Jersey Artillery (Channel Islands Militia)	1881 (Converted: re-organised as garrison artillery)	Jersey	N/A	N/A	N/A	Retained	Retained. Disbanded 1929 (when Channel Islands coastal artillery battalions were closed)	N/A	
37	7th Brigade, South Irish Division, Royal Artillery	April 1882 (Converted: Previously Clare Militia Regiment of Foot, of the Irish Militia (1793-1882); Amalgamated with the Cork Militia as the 3rd Battalion, Royal Munster Fusiliers (March 1882-April 1882)	County Clare	N/A	The Clare Artillery (Southern Division, Royal Artillery)	The Clare Artillery, Royal Garrison Artillery (Militia)	Transferred to Special Reserve Royal Field Artillery in 1908 and disbanded in 1909	N/A	N/A	Second Boer War 19/02/1900-16/11/1900
4	3rd Cork Artillery; Changed in 1855 to The West Cork Artillery	1854	County Cork	2nd Brigade, South Irish Division, Royal Artillery	The Cork Artillery (Southern Division, Royal Artillery), having amalgamated with the 3rd Brigade (Royal Cork City Artillery)	Cork Royal Garrison Artillery (Militia)	Transferred to Special Reserve Royal Field Artillery in 1908. Retained in 1909.	Disbanded	N/A	Crimean War 02/1855-09/1856; Second Boer War 09/05/1900-06/11/1900
5	The Cork City Artillery; Changed to The Royal Cork City Artillery in 1855	1854 (Converted: Previously the 27th Royal Cork City Regiment of the Irish Militia (1793-1854)	Cork	3rd Brigade, South Irish Division, Royal Artillery	The Cork Artillery (Southern Division, Royal Artillery), having amalgamated with the 2nd Brigade, South Irish Division, Royal Artillery	Cork Royal Garrison Artillery (Militia)	Transferred to Special Reserve Royal Field Artillery in 1908. Retained in 1909.	Disbanded	N/A	Crimean War 02/1855-09/1856; Second Boer War 09/05/1900-06/11/1900
6	Royal Cornwall and Devon Miners Regiment of Militia; Changed in May, 1853, to Royal Cornwall & Devon Miners Artillery Militia	1852 (Converted: Previously Cornwall and Devon Miners Regiment of Militia (1798-1800); Royal Cornwall and Devon Miners Regiment of Militia (1800-1853))	Cornwall; Devon	2nd Brigade, Western Division, Royal Artillery	Cornwall & Devon Miners Artillery (Southern Division, Royal Artillery)	Cornwall & Devon Miners Royal Garrison Artillery (Militia)	Transferred to Special Reserve Royal Field Artillery in 1908 and disbanded in 1909	N/A	N/A	Crimean War 15/01/1855-26/05/1856; Second Boer War 07/05/1900-05/10/1900
7	The Devon Artillery Militia	1853 (Converted: Previously The North Devon Militia (1763-1853))	Devon	3rd Brigade, Western Division, Royal Artillery	The Devon Artillery (Western Division, Royal Artillery)	The Devon Royal Garrison Artillery (Militia)	Transferred to Special Reserve Royal Field Artillery in 1908 and disbanded in 1909	N/A	N/A	Crimean War 01/1855-06/1856; Threat of war 09/03/1885-30/09/1885 -Second Boer War 01/05/1900-17/10/1900
8	The Donegal Artillery Militia (Changed in 1855 to The Donegal Artillery (The Prince of Wales's)	1854 (Converted: Previously four of the twelve companies of The Donegal Infantry Militia' (1793-1854)	Donegal	3rd Brigade, North Irish Division, Royal Artillery	The Donegal Artillery (Southern Division, Royal Artillery)	The Donegal Royal Garrison Artillery (Militia)	Transferred to Special Reserve Royal Field Artillery in 1908 and disbanded in 1909	N/A	N/A	Crimean War 09/1855-09/1856; Second Boer War 02/05/1900-06/11/1900; Five officers and one-hundred and forty-four other ranks served in South Africa, embarking in March, 1900. Along with the Antrim Artillery Service Company, they formed a Brigade Division, Irish Militia Artillery. The company left Kimberley, headed for Cape Town and Ireland, on 7 June 1901. Casualties in South Africa were one officer, two Corporals, and one Gunner died of disease. Captain FH Crawford, Acting Sergeant-Major CW Holt, and Sergeant J. Clark were mentioned -in-despatches. Acting Sergeant-Major CW Holt was awarded the Distinguished Conduct Medal.
9	Dublin City Artillery Militia	1854 (New)	Dublin	4th Brigade, North Irish Division, Royal Artillery	The Dublin City Artillery (Southern Division, Royal Artillery)	The Dublin City Royal Garrison Artillery (Militia)	Transferred to Special Reserve Royal Field Artillery in 1908 and disbanded in 1909	N/A	N/A	Crimean War 02/1855-09/1856; Indian Mutiny 02/04/1859-29/11/1860; Second Boer War 09/05/1900-06/11/1900
10	Durham Artillery Militia	1853 (new)	Durham	2nd Brigade, Northern Division, Royal Artillery	The Durham Artillery (Western Division, Royal Artillery)	The Durham Royal Garrison Artillery (Militia)	Transferred to Special Reserve Royal Field Artillery in 1908 and disbanded in 1909	N/A	N/A	Indian Mutiny 05/04/1859-25/03/1861; Second Boer War 01/05/1900-11/10/1900; A Service Company of five officers and one-hundred and seventy other ranks departed for South Africa on 24 March 1900. Together with a Duke of Edinburgh's Own Edinburgh Artillery Service Company, it formed the Durham & Edinburgh Division Royal Garrison Artillery. Six other ranks were wounded. One officer was awarded the Distinguished Service Order. One officer was recommended for the Distinguished Service Order and two Bombardiers for the Distinguished Conduct Medal, though these were not awarded. Four officers, a Company Sergeant Major, and three non-commissioned officers were mentioned-in-despatches. The Service Company returned to England at the end of 1901.
11	The Edinburgh Artillery Militia (Changed in 1875 to The Duke of Edinburgh's Own Edinburgh Artillery Militia)	1854 (New)	Edinburgh	3rd Brigade, Scottish Division, Royal Artillery	The Duke of Edinburgh's Own Edinburgh Artillery (Southern Division, Royal Artillery)	The Duke of Edinburgh's Own Edinburgh Royal Garrison Artillery (Militia)	Transferred to Special Reserve Royal Field Artillery in 1908 and disbanded in 1909	N/A	N/A	Crimean War 02/02/1855-26/05/1856; Indian Mutiny 04/04/1859-08/1860; Second Boer War 07/05/1900-06/10/1900; A Service Company of five officers and one-hundred and fifty-four other ranks served in South Africa, embarking on 23 March 1900, and (together with a Durham Artillery Service Company) forming the Durham & Edinburgh Division Royal Garrison Artillery. In September, 1901, the Service Company escorted Boer prisoners-of-war to Bombay, India, where it remained to as guards until departing for the United Kingdom in November, 1901. Casualties were three Gunners who died from disease. Three officers and one non-commissioned officer were mentioned-in-despatches.
12	Fifeshire Artillery Militia	1855 (Converted: Previously The Fifeshire Militia (1798-1855))	Fifeshire	4th Brigade, Scottish Division, Royal Artillery	The Fife Artillery (Southern Division, Royal Artillery)	The Fife Royal Garrison Artillery (Militia)	Transferred to Special Reserve Royal Field Artillery in 1908 and disbanded in 1909	N/A	N/A	Crimean War 02/1855-05/1856; Indian Mutiny 25/04/1859-01/09/1860; Second Boer War 04/05/1900-12/10/1900
13	The Forfar & Kincardine Artillery Militia	Forfarshire; Kincardine	1854 (Converted: Previously The Forfarshire Regiment of Militia (1798-1802), and The Forfarshire and Kincardine Militia (1802-1854))	5th Brigade, Scottish Division, Royal Artillery	The Forfar & Kincardine Artillery (Southern Division, Royal Artillery)	The Forfar & Kincardine Royal Garrison Artillery (Militia)	Transferred to Special Reserve Royal Field Artillery in 1908 and disbanded in 1909	N/A	N/A	Crimean War 02/1855-05/1856; Indian Mutiny 11/1857-08/1860; Second Boer War 07/05/1900-06/10/1900
14	The Galway Militia Artillery	1854 (New: Evidently only existed on paper 'til 1878. Disbanded in 1888)	Galway	5th Brigade, Northern Irish Division, Royal Artillery	N/A	N/A	N/A	N/A	N/A	
15	The Glamorgan Artillery (Changed in 1855 to The Royal Glamorgan Artillery Militia	1854 (New)	Glamorgan	2nd Brigade, Welsh Division, Royal Artillery	The Glamorgan Artillery (Western Division, Royal Artillery)	The Glamorgan Royal Garrison Artillery (Militia)	Transferred to Special Reserve Royal Field Artillery in 1908 and disbanded in 1909	N/A	N/A	Second Boer War 01/05/1900-03/10/1900
16; 17 (after 1891 amalgamation)	Hampshire Militia Artillery	1853 (New)	Hampshire	2 Brigade, Southern Division, Royal Artillery	The Hampshire Artillery (Southern Division, Royal Artillery) (Amalgamated with the Duke of Connaught's Own Isle of Wight Artillery in 1891 to form The Duke of Connaught's Own Hampshire and Isle of Wight Artillery (Southern Division, Royal Artillery))	In the 1902 Harts, Pg 878, Under "Militia", "Royal Garrison Artillery": Hampshire and Isle of Wight Artillery (Duke of Connaught's Own Isle of Wight)	Transferred to Special Reserve Royal Field Artillery in 1908 and disbanded in 1909	N/A	N/A	Crimean War 07/12/1854-05/06/1856; Indian Mutiny 11/10/1858-10/1860; Threat of war 09/03/1885-30/09/1885; Second Boer War 01/05/1900-06/11/1900
17	Isle of Wight Artillery Militia	1853 (Converted: Previously Isle of Wight Light Infantry Militia (1757-1853))	Isle of Wight	3rd Brigade, Southern Division, Royal Artillery (Changed in 1886 to 3rd (Duke of Connaught's Own) Brigade, Southern Division, Royal Artillery)	The Duke of Connaught's Own Isle of Wight Artillery (Southern Division, Royal Artillery) (Amalgamated with The Hampshire Artillery in 1891 to form The Duke of Connaught's Own Hampshire and Isle of Wight Artillery (Southern Division, Royal Artillery))	In the 1902 Harts, Pg 878, Under "Militia", "Royal Garrison Artillery": Hampshire and Isle of Wight Artillery (Duke of Connaught's Own Isle of Wight) (1903 & 1907)	Transferred to Special Reserve Royal Field Artillery in 1908 and disbanded in 1909	N/A	N/A	Crimean War 01/02/1855-16/06/1856
N/A	Jamaica Militia Artillery	1891 (new)	Jamaica	N/A	N/A	Not renamed	Retained as garrison artillery	Retained		
18	The Kent Militia Artillery	1853 (New)	Kent	2nd Brigade, Cinque Ports Division, Royal Artillery	The Kent Artillery (Eastern Division, Royal Artillery)	The Kent Royal Garrison Artillery (Militia)	Transferred to Special Reserve Royal Field Artillery in 1908 and disbanded in 1909	N/A	N/A	Crimean War 30/01/1855-07/1856; Second Boer War 04/05/1900-03/10/1900; Two officers served in South Africa, both Mentioned-in-Despatches
19	The Royal Lancashire Militia Artillery	1853 (New)	Lancashire	2nd Brigade, Lancashire Division, Royal Artillery	The Lancashire Artillery (Southern Division, Royal Artillery)	The Lancashire Royal Garrison Artillery (Militia)	Transferred to Special Reserve Royal Field Artillery in 1908 and disbanded in 1909	N/A	N/A	Crimean War 25/01/1855-30/05/1856; Indian Mutiny 04/10/1857-15/06/1860; Second Boer War 03/05/1900-10/10/1900
N/A	Lancashire Royal Field Artillery	1901 (New)	Lancashire	N/A	N/A	No change	Transferred to Special Reserve Royal Field Artillery in 1908 and disbanded in 1909	N/A	N/A	
21	Londonderry Artillery Militia (amalgamated 1875 with the Armagh Artillery and Tyrone Artillery to form The Mid-Ulster Regiment of Artillery Militia, which retained 21 in order of precedence)	1855 (New)	County Londonderry (from 1875: Armagh; Londonderry; Tyrone)	The 6th Brigade, North Irish Division, Royal Artillery	Mid-Ulster Artillery (Southern Division, Royal Artillery)	The Mid-Ulster Royal Garrison Artillery (Militia)	Transferred to Special Reserve Royal Field Artillery in 1908 and disbanded in 1909	N/A	N/A	Second Boer War 03/05/1900-06/11/1900
36	9th Brigade, North Irish Division, Royal Artillery	April 1882 (Converted: Previously The Londonderry Militia Regiment (1793-1855); The Londonderry Militia Light Infantry (1855-1882); amalgamated with the Tyrone Fusiliers, becoming 4th Battalion, Royal Inniskilling Fusiliers (March 1882-April 1882))	Londonderry	N/A	The Londonderry Artillery (Southern Division, Royal Artillery)	The Londonderry Royal Garrison Artillery (Militia)	Transferred to Special Reserve Royal Field Artillery in 1908 and disbanded in 1909	N/A	N/A	Second Boer War 01/05/1900-03/10/1900; Sergeant AW Vyce volunteered for service in South Africa and was attached to the Antrim and Donegal Brigade; Mentioned-in-Despatches and awarded Distinguished Conduct Medal.
20	The Limerick City Artillery Militia	1854 (Converted: Previously the Irish Militia's The City of Limerick Regiment of Militia (1794-1854)	Limerick	4th Brigade, South Irish Division, Royal Artillery	The Limerick City Artillery (Southern Division, Royal Artillery)	Limerick City Royal Garrison Artillery (Militia)	Transferred to Special Reserve Royal Field Artillery in 1908 and disbanded in 1909	N/A	N/A	Crimean War 04/1855-07/1856; Second Boer War 04/05/1900-06/11/1900
22	The Norfolk Artillery Militia (Changed in 1875 to The Prince of Wales's Own Norfolk Artillery Militia	1853 (New)	Norfolk	The Prince of Wales's Own 2nd Brigade, Eastern Division, Royal Artillery	The Prince of Wales's Own Norfolk Artillery (Eastern Division, Royal Artillery)	The Prince of Wales's Own Norfolk Royal Garrison Artillery (Militia)	Transferred to Special Reserve Royal Field Artillery in 1908 and disbanded in 1909	N/A	N/A	Crimean War 25/01/1855-15/06/1856; Indian Mutiny 05/04/1859-18/08/1860; Second Boer War 02/05/1900-13/10/1900; A Service Company of five officers and 132 other ranks served in South Africa, arriving at Cape Town on 27 May 1901, and returning in 1902. Casualties: One Gunner died of disease; One non-commissioned officer wounded; One non-commissioned officer and one Gunner badly injured. One officer, one Company Sergeant Major, and one non-commissioned officer mentioned-in-despatches. One officer awarded the Companion of the Order of St Michael and St George; One Company Sergeant Major awarded the Distinguished Conduct Medal.
23	The Northumberland Militia Artillery	1854 (New)	Northumberland	3rd Brigade, Northern Division, Royal Artillery	The Northumberland Artillery (Western Division, Royal Artillery)	The Northumberland Royal Garrison Artillery (Militia)	Transferred to Special Reserve Royal Field Artillery in 1908 and disbanded in 1909	N/A	N/A	Indian Mutiny 04/04/1859-02/03/1861; Second Boer War 07/05/1900-11/10/1900
24; 31	The Royal Pembrokeshire Artillery Regiment of Militia; Amalgamated in 1861 with the Royal Carmarthen Rifle Regiment to form The Royal Carmarthen & Pembroke Artillery (retaining 24 in order-of-precedence from The Royal Pembrokeshire Artillery Regiment of Militia), which separated in 1867 with The Royal Carmarthen Artillery retaining 24 in order-of-precedence, and The Royal Pembrokeshire Artillery renumbered 31 (formerly the number of The East & North York Artillery, which was renumbered 32)	1853 (Converted: Previously Pembrokeshire Militia Regiment (1758-1804); The Royal Pembrokshire Militia (1804-1807); The Royal Pembrokshire Fuzileers (1807-1810); The Pembroke Light Infantry (1810-1811); The Royal Pembroke Militia (Rifle Corps) (1811-1853)	Pembrokeshire	4th Brigade, Welsh Division, Royal Artillery	The Pembroke Artillery (Western Division, Royal Artillery)	The Pembroke Royal Garrison Artillery (Militia)	Transferred to Special Reserve Royal Field Artillery in 1908 and disbanded in 1909	N/A	N/A	Crimean War 30-01/1855-07/1856; Second Boer War 04/05/1900-03/10/1900
35	The Sligo Artillery Militia (Changed in 1877 to The Duke of Connaught's Own Sligo Artillery Militia)	1877 (Converted: Previously the Sligo Light Infantry Militia' (1793-1855); and Sligo Rifles Militia (1855-1877)	Sligo	8th Brigade (Duke of Connaught's Own), North Irish Division, Royal Artillery	The Duke of Connaught's Own Sligo Artillery (Southern Division, Royal Artillery)	The Duke of Connaught's Own Sligo Royal Garrison Artillery (Militia)	Transferred to Special Reserve Royal Field Artillery in 1908 and disbanded in 1909	N/A	N/A	Second Boer War 10/05/1900-10/10/1900
25	The Suffolk Artillery Militia	1853 (Converted: Previously the East Suffolk Militia (1759-1831); East Suffolk Light Infantry Militia (1831-1853))	Suffolk	3rd Brigade, Eastern Division, Royal Artillery	The Suffolk Artillery (Eastern Division, Royal Artillery)	The Suffolk Royal Garrison Artillery (Militia)	Transferred to Special Reserve Royal Field Artillery in 1908 and disbanded in 1909	N/A	N/A	Crimean War 3/1855-07/1856; Indian Mutiny 12/04/1859-11/1860; Second Boer War 01/05/1900-06/11/1900
26	Royal Sussex Militia Artillery	1853 (New)	Sussex	3rd Brigade, Cinque Ports Division, Royal Artillery	The Sussex Artillery (Eastern Division, Royal Artillery)	The Sussex Royal Garrison Artillery (Militia)	Transferred to Special Reserve Royal Field Artillery in 1908 and disbanded in 1909	N/A	N/A	Crimean War 01/02/1855-16/06/1856; Second Boer War 01/05/1900-17/10/1900
27	The South Tipperary Artillery Regiment of Militia	1854 (Converted: Previously The Tipperary Militia (1793-1812); The Tipperary (or Duke of Clarence's Munster) Regiment of Militia (1812-1854); The 1st or South Tipperary Regiment of Militia (1854-1854))	County Tipperary	5th Brigade, South Irish Division, Royal Artillery	The Tipperary Artillery (Southern Division, Royal Artillery)	The Tipperary Royal Garrison Artillery (Militia)	Transferred to Special Reserve Royal Field Artillery in 1908 and disbanded in 1909	N/A	N/A	Crimean War 25/01/1855-28/07/1856; Indian Mutiny 28/10/1858-21/03/1861; Second Boer War 02/05/1900-10/10/1900
28	The Tyrone Artillery Militia (Amalgamated 1875 with the Armagh Artillery and Londonderry Artillery to form The Mid-Ulster Regiment of Artillery Militia)	1855 (New)	Tyrone (from 1875: Armagh; Londonderry; Tyrone)	The 6th Brigade, North Irish Division, Royal Artillery	Mid-Ulster Artillery (Southern Division, Royal Artillery)	The Mid-Ulster Royal Garrison Artillery (Militia)	Transferred to Special Reserve Royal Field Artillery in 1908 and disbanded in 1909	N/A	N/A	Crimean War 09/1855-07/1856; Second Boer War 03/05/1900-06/11/1900
29	The Waterford Artillery Militia	1854 (Converted: Previously the Irish Militia's The Waterford Light Infantry Regiment of Militia (1793-1854))	Waterford	6th Brigade, South Irish Division, Royal Artillery	The Waterford Artillery (Southern Division, Royal Artillery)	The Waterford Royal Garrison Artillery (Militia)	Transferred to Special Reserve Royal Field Artillery in 1908 and disbanded in 1909	N/A	N/A	Crimean War 14/01/1855-23/07/1856; Indian Mutiny 01/10/1857-30/04/1860; Second Boer War 07/05/1900-13/10/1900
34	The Wicklow Artillery Militia	1877 (Converted: Previously the Irish Militia's Wicklow Militia (1793-1855); Wicklow Rifles (1855-1877))	Wicklow	7th Brigade, North Irish Division, Royal Artillery	The Wicklow Artillery (Southern Division) Royal Artillery	The Wicklow Royal Garrison Artillery (Militia)	Transferred to Special Reserve Royal Field Artillery in 1908 and disbanded in 1909	N/A	N/A	Second Boer War 11/05/1900-09/10/1900
31; 32 (renumbered 32 in 187, after The Pembroke Artillery was renumbered 31)	The East & North York Artillery (renamed The Yorkshire Artillery Militia in 1873)	1860 (New: but an 180 amalgam of The North York Artillery Militia and The East York Artillery Militia, both created in 1860, neither of which had yet begun recruiting)	Yorkshire	4 Brigade, Northern Division, Royal Artillery	The Yorkshire Artillery (Western Division, Royal Artillery)	The Yorkshire Royal Garrison Artillery (Militia)	Transferred to Special Reserve Royal Field Artillery in 1908 and disbanded in 1909	N/A	N/A	Second Boer War 01/05/1900-12/10/1900
