= Clonmore, County Carlow =

Clonmore Cluain Mhór
- Village
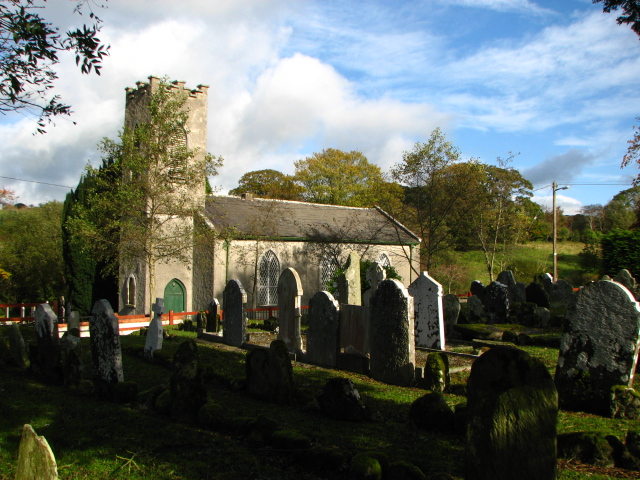
- Clonmore Church and graveyard

- Location in Ireland
- Coordinates: 52°49′29″N 6°34′08″W
- Country: Ireland
- Province: Leinster
- County: County Carlow
- Elevation: 173 m (568 ft)
- Time zone: UTC+0 (WET)
  - Summer (DST): UTC-1 (IST (WEST))
- Irish Grid Reference: S965757

Clonmore (Irish: Cluain Mhór, meaning 'large meadow') is a village, civil parish and townland in County Carlow, Ireland. It is located 3½ miles south of Hacketstown and 9 miles east of Tullow in the north-east corner of County Carlow.

== History ==
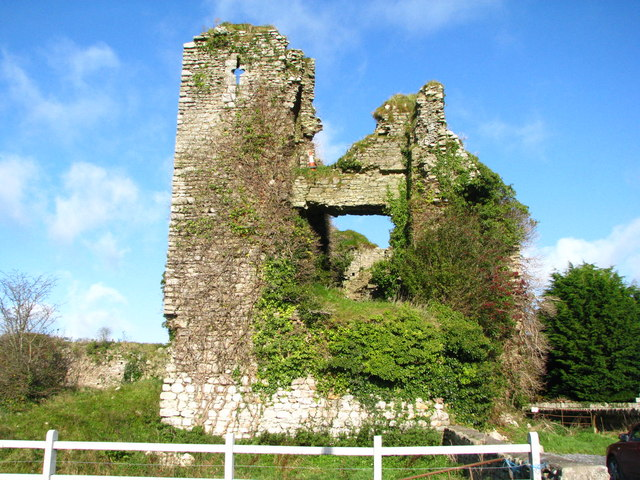
Clonmore castle

Clonmore was named after St Mogue (not to be confused with another St Mogue of the same name) who, around the year 530, established a religious community and built a monastery at the location.

The monastery is recorded as having been plundered multiple times by the vikings between 832 and 836 who were likely overwintering in nearby County Wicklow. A specific incident is recorded as having occurred on Christmas eve 835.

It is likely the original 6th century monastic settlement was destroyed in a power struggle around the year 1040 by Diarmait mac Máel na mBó who wished to prevent the monastery being used by the Mac Murchadas as a base from which to challenge his kingship of south Leinster.

=== Clonmore castle ===
A significant feature of the village is Clonmore Castle, this castle was not mentioned until the 14th century, but the shape of the trefoil window in the south wall shows that it was built probably towards the end of the 13th century. The castle is nearly square in plan with rectangular towers at the southern sides of the courtyard. Clonmore was captured in 1516 by the Earl of Kildare and in 1598 by the Earl of Ormond. It changed hands several times and was finally taken by Oliver Cromwell's forces under Colonel Hewson in 1650. Today much of the castle has been removed for construction of local amenities such as the neighbouring hall and former schoolhouse

== See also ==
- List of towns in the Republic of Ireland
