= Lord Lieutenant of Wicklow =

Ceremonial officer in Wicklow, Ireland

This is a list of people who have served as Lord-Lieutenant of Wicklow. A lord-lieutenant is the British monarch's personal representative, in this case of County Wicklow, Ireland.

There were lieutenants of counties in Ireland until the reign of James II, when they were renamed governors. The office of Lord Lieutenant was recreated on 23 August 1831.

== Governors ==
- Edward Brabazon, 4th Earl of Meath: 1699– (died 1707)
- Chaworth Brabazon, 6th Earl of Meath: (died 1763)
- Edward Stratford, 2nd Earl of Aldborough: 1778- (died 1801)
- Sir Skeffington Smyth, 1st Baronet: (died 1797)
- John Stratford, 3rd Earl of Aldborough: 1795– 1823 (died 1823)
- The Hon. Hugh Howard: –1831
- Benjamin O'Neale Stratford, 4th Earl of Aldborough: 1777–1831
- William Howard, 3rd Earl of Wicklow: 1814– (died 1818)
- William Howard, 4th Earl of Wicklow: –1831

== Lord Lieutenants ==
- William Howard, 4th Earl of Wicklow, 7 October 1831 – 22 March 1869
- William Brabazon, 11th Earl of Meath, 1869 – 26 May 1887
- Edward Leeson, 6th Earl of Milltown, 14 June 1887 – 30 May 1890
- William Proby, 5th Earl of Carysfort, 25 July 1890 – 4 September 1909
- Mervyn Wingfield, 8th Viscount Powerscourt, 15 February 1910 – 1922
