= Earl of Wicklow =

Title in the Peerage of Ireland

Earl of Wicklow was a title in the Peerage of Ireland. It was created in 1793 for Alice Howard, Dowager Viscountess Wicklow. Born Alice Forward, she was the daughter of William Forward, Member of the Irish House of Commons for the County Donegal, and the widow of Ralph Howard, 1st Viscount Wicklow. The latter was the son of the Right Reverend Robert Howard, Lord Bishop of Elphin, and represented the County Wicklow in the Irish Parliament. In 1776 he was raised to the Peerage of Ireland as Baron Clonmore, of Clonmore in the County of Carlow, and in 1785 he was further honoured when he was made Viscount Wicklow, also in the Peerage of Ireland. Both Lord and Lady Wicklow were succeeded by their eldest son, the second Earl. He sat in the House of Lords as one of the twenty-eight original Irish representative peers from 1800 to 1815. He never married and was succeeded by his younger brother, the third Earl. In 1780 he had assumed by Royal licence his maternal grandfather's surname of Forward. After succeeding in the earldom in 1815 he resumed the same year by Royal licence the surname of Howard after that of Forward.

On his death, the titles passed to his son, the fourth Earl. He was an Irish Representative Peer from 1821 to 1869 and served as Lord-Lieutenant of County Wicklow from 1831 to 1869. He was succeeded by his nephew, the fifth Earl. He was the eldest son from the second marriage of Reverend the Hon. Francis Howard, second son of the third Earl. He was an Irish Representative Peer from 1872 to 1881. When he died unmarried at an early age the titles passed to his younger brother, the sixth Earl. He sat in the House of Lords as an Irish Representative Peer from 1888 to 1891. He was succeeded by his eldest son, the seventh Earl. He was an Irish Representative Peer from 1905 to 1946 and a Senator of the Irish Free State from 1922 to 1928. When he died the titles passed to his son, the eighth Earl, who moved in literary and artistic circles and was a close friend of Evelyn Waugh. The 8th Earl, who married the former member of the Irish Senate Eleanor Butler in 1959, was childless and on his death in 1978, the titles passed to his first cousin, Cecil Aylmar Howard, a grandson of the sixth earl. The ninth earl died in 1983 without issue and the peerages became extinct.

The ancestral seat of the Earls of Wicklow was the palatial Shelton Abbey, near Arklow, County Wicklow, which remained in the family until 1951. Shortly thereafter financial difficulties forced the 8th Earl to sell the estate to the Irish State. Shelton Abbey is currently used as an open prison.

== Viscounts Wicklow (1785) ==
- Ralph Howard, 1st Viscount Wicklow (1726–1789)
- Robert Howard, 2nd Viscount Wicklow (1757–1815) (succeeded as Earl of Wicklow in 1807)

== Earls of Wicklow (1793) ==
- Alice Howard, 1st Countess of Wicklow (1736–1807)
- Robert Howard, 2nd Earl of Wicklow (1757–1815)
- William Howard, 3rd Earl of Wicklow (1761–1818)
- William Howard, 4th Earl of Wicklow (1788–1869)
- Charles Francis Arnold Howard, 5th Earl of Wicklow (1839–1881)
- Cecil Ralph Howard, 6th Earl of Wicklow (1842–1891)
- Ralph Francis Howard, 7th Earl of Wicklow (1877–1946)
- William Cecil James Philip John Paul Howard, 8th Earl of Wicklow (1902–1978)
- Cecil Aylmar Howard, 9th Earl of Wicklow (1909-1983)

== See also ==
- Dunduff Castle, South Ayrshire – for the history of the Stewarts of Dunduff, whose property in Donegal the Forward family and then the Howard Earls of Wicklow inherited.
