= Robert Howard, 2nd Earl of Wicklow =

Irish politician

Robert Howard, 2nd Earl of Wicklow (7 August 1757 – 23 October 1815) was an Anglo-Irish politician and peer.

== Biography ==
Howard was the eldest son of Ralph Howard, 1st Viscount Wicklow and his wife, Alice Howard, 1st Countess of Wicklow. Howard's mother had been made a peeress in her own right following the death of her husband.

He served in the Irish House of Commons as the Member of Parliament for St Johnstown between 1776 and 1789. On 26 June 1789, he succeeded to his father's title, forcing him to resign his seat in the Commons, and he assumed his seat in the Irish House of Lords. Following the implementation of the Acts of Union 1800 he was elected as one of the original 28 Irish representative peers and took his seat in the British House of Lords. Following his mother's death on 7 March 1807, he succeeded to his mother's title as Earl of Wicklow.

On the outbreak of the French Revolutionary War he raised the Wicklow Militia under the Militia Act (Ireland) 1793, and was appointed Lieutenant-Colonel commanding on 25 April 1793 (he was later promoted to Colonel with the same date of seniority). He resigned his command in August 1797, and his brother, the Hon Hugh Howard, was appointed to succeed him.

He never married, and was succeeded in his titles by his younger brother, William Howard.

Parliament of Ireland
Preceded by William Talbot; Hugh Howard	Member of Parliament for St Johnstown; 1776–1789; With: Hugh Howard; William Howard	Succeeded by Hon. Hugh Howard; William Howard
Parliament of the United Kingdom
New post	Representative peer for Ireland; 1800–1815	Succeeded by The Earl of Mayo
Peerage of Ireland
Preceded by Alice Howard	Earl of Wicklow; 1807–1815	Succeeded by William Howard
Preceded by Ralph Howard	Viscount Wicklow; 1789–1815	Succeeded by William Howard
