= Charles Howard, 5th Earl of Wicklow =

Anglo-Irish peer

Charles Francis Arnold Howard, 5th Earl of Wicklow (5 November 1839 – 20 June 1881) was an Anglo-Irish peer.

== Biography ==
Howard was the eldest son of Rev. Hon. Francis Howard, the third son of William Howard, 3rd Earl of Wicklow and Eleanor Caulfeild. He was educated at Magdalen College, Oxford, before purchasing a commission as a Cornet in the 11th Hussars on 18 December 1860. On 24 January 1865 he purchased a promotion to Lieutenant and later transferred to the 9th Lancers. He served as Aide-de-Camp to the Lord Lieutenant of Ireland between 1864 and 1866. On 11 December 1871 he was appointed Honorary Colonel of the Wicklow Militia (Wicklow Artillery Militia from 1877).

In 1869 his uncle, William Howard, died, and Howard succeeded to his titles. In 1872 he was elected as an Irish representative peer and assumed his seat on the Conservative benches in the House of Lords. Between 1874 and 1879 Lord Wicklow was State Steward to the Lord Lieutenant of Ireland.

He did not marry, and was succeeded by his younger brother, Cecil Howard, following his death in 1881. Much of his life was spent defending himself against the legal challenge against him by Ellen Howard, wife of his late half-brother, William.

Political offices
Preceded by The Lord Inchiquin	Representative peer for Ireland; 1872–1881	Succeeded by The Earl of Milltown
Peerage of Ireland
Preceded by William Howard	Earl of Wicklow; 1869–1881	Succeeded by Cecil Howard
