= St Johnstown (County Donegal) (Parliament of Ireland constituency) =

Pre-1801 Irish constituency

St Johnstown
- Former borough constituency for the Irish House of Commons
- County: County Donegal
- Borough: St Johnston

–1801
- Replaced by: Disfranchised

St Johnstown was a borough constituency for St Johnston in County Donegal represented in the Irish House of Commons until 1800.

== Members of Parliament ==
Election	First MP	Second MP
1661	James Galbraith	William Hamilton
1692	John Forward	Charles Melville
1695	Humphrey May	Henry Langford
1703	Kilner Brasier	Charles Melville
1713	James Topham	John Hamilton
1715	James Topham	William Forward
1725	Hon. Henry Hamilton	William Forward
1727	Hon. George Hamilton	William Forward
May 1761	Ralph Howard	William Forward
1761	William Talbot	William Forward
1768	William Talbot	Ralph Howard
1769	William Talbot	Hugh Howard
1776	Robert Howard	Hugh Howard
1783	Hon. Robert Howard	Hon. William Forward-Howard
1790	Hon. Hugh Howard	Hon. William Forward-Howard
1801	Constituency disenfranchised	
