= Wicklow Militia =

Auxiliary unit of the British Army

Wicklow Militia Wicklow Rifles Wicklow Artillery Militia
- Active: 25 April 1793–October 1909
- Country: Ireland (1793–1800); United Kingdom (1801–1909)
- Branch: Militia
- Role: Infantry/Garrison Artillery
- Size: 4–6 companies/batteries
- Part of: North Irish Division, Royal Artillery; Southern Division, Royal Artillery
- Garrison/HQ: Wicklow (Arklow 1817–58)
- Engagements: Irish Rebellion of 1798: Dunlavin; Kilcavan Hill; Battle of Vinegar Hill; Castlecomber; Kilconnel Hill

The Wicklow Militia, later the Wicklow Rifles, was an Irish Militia regiment raised in County Wicklow in 1793. It saw service during the Irish Rebellion of 1798. It was later converted into a militia artillery unit before being disbanded in 1909.

== Background ==
Although there are scattered references to town guards in 1584, no organised militia existed in Ireland before 1660. After that date, some militia forces were organised in the reign of King Charles II but it was not until 1715 that the Irish Militia came under statutory authority. During the 18th Century there were various Volunteer Associations and unofficial militia units controlled by the landowners, concerned mainly with internal security. During the War of American Independence, the threat of invasion by the Americans' allies, France and Spain, appeared to be serious. While most of the Regular Army was fighting overseas, the coasts of England and Wales were defended by the embodied Militia, but Ireland had no equivalent force. The Parliament of Ireland passed a Militia Act, but this failed to create an effective force. However it opened the way for the paramilitary Irish Volunteers to fill the gap. The Volunteers were outside the control of either the parliament or the Dublin Castle administration. When the invasion threat receded they diminished in numbers but remained a political force. On the outbreak of the French Revolutionary War In 1793, the Irish administration passed an effective Militia Act that created an official Irish Militia, while the paramilitary volunteers were essentially banned. The new Act was based on existing English precedents, with the men conscripted by ballot to fill county quotas (paid substitutes were permitted) and the officers having to meet certain property qualifications.

== Wicklow Militia ==
County Wicklow was given a quota of 356 men to find, to be organised into a battalion of six companies, and Robert Howard, 2nd Viscount Wicklow, was appointed Lieutenant-Colonel commanding on 25 April 1793 (he was later promoted to Colonel with the same date of seniority). The men were raised by enrolling volunteers rather than resorting to the ballot, and they was first embodied for duty on 10 June 1793.

=== French Revolutionary War ===
The French Revolutionary and Napoleonic Wars saw the British and Irish militia embodied for a whole generation, becoming regiments of full-time professional soldiers (though restricted to service in Britain or Ireland respectively), which the regular army increasingly saw as a prime source of recruits. They served in coast defences, manned garrisons, guarded prisoners of war, and carried out internal security duties.

By April 1794 the Wicklow Militia was quartered at Strabane, with one company detached to Omagh, staying there until July 1795 when it moved to Sligo for 10 months. By November 1796 it was headquartered at Portarlington. Anxiety about a possible French invasion grew during the autumn of 1796 and preparations were made for field operations. A large French expeditionary force appeared in Bantry Bay on 21 December and troops from all over Ireland were marched towards the threatened area. A detachment of the Wicklow Militia started out from Portarlington to Mitchelstown on 26 December. Soon afterwards news arrived that the French fleet had been scattered by the winter storms. Several ships had been wrecked and none of the French troops succeeded in landing; there was no sign of a rising by the United Irishmen. The invasion was called off on 29 December, and the troop concentration was dispersed in early 1797. The Wicklow detachment returned to Portarlington on 27 January. The regiment later moved to Mullingar, where it carried out operations in. support of the civil powers and the revenue service across County Westmeath, for which each militiamen was awarded a silver medal by the county authorities.

Early in 1797 the light companies of the militia were detached to join composite battalions drawn from several militia regiments. The Wicklow contingent was attached to 1st Light Battalion, stationed at Kilkenny. The militia regiments were each issued with two light six-pounder 'battalion guns', with the gun detachments trained by the Royal Artillery. When the militiamen of 1793 reached the end of their four-year enlistment in 1797, most of the Irish regiments were able to maintain their numbers through re-enlistments (for a bounty). The Wicklow Militia was augmented in July 1797 and its establishment now totalled 460 all ranks. Viscount Wicklow resigned his command in August 1797, and his brother, Major (Brevet Lt-Col) the Hon Hugh Howard, was promoted to substantive lieutenant-colonel and colonel to succeed him.

=== Irish Rebellion ===
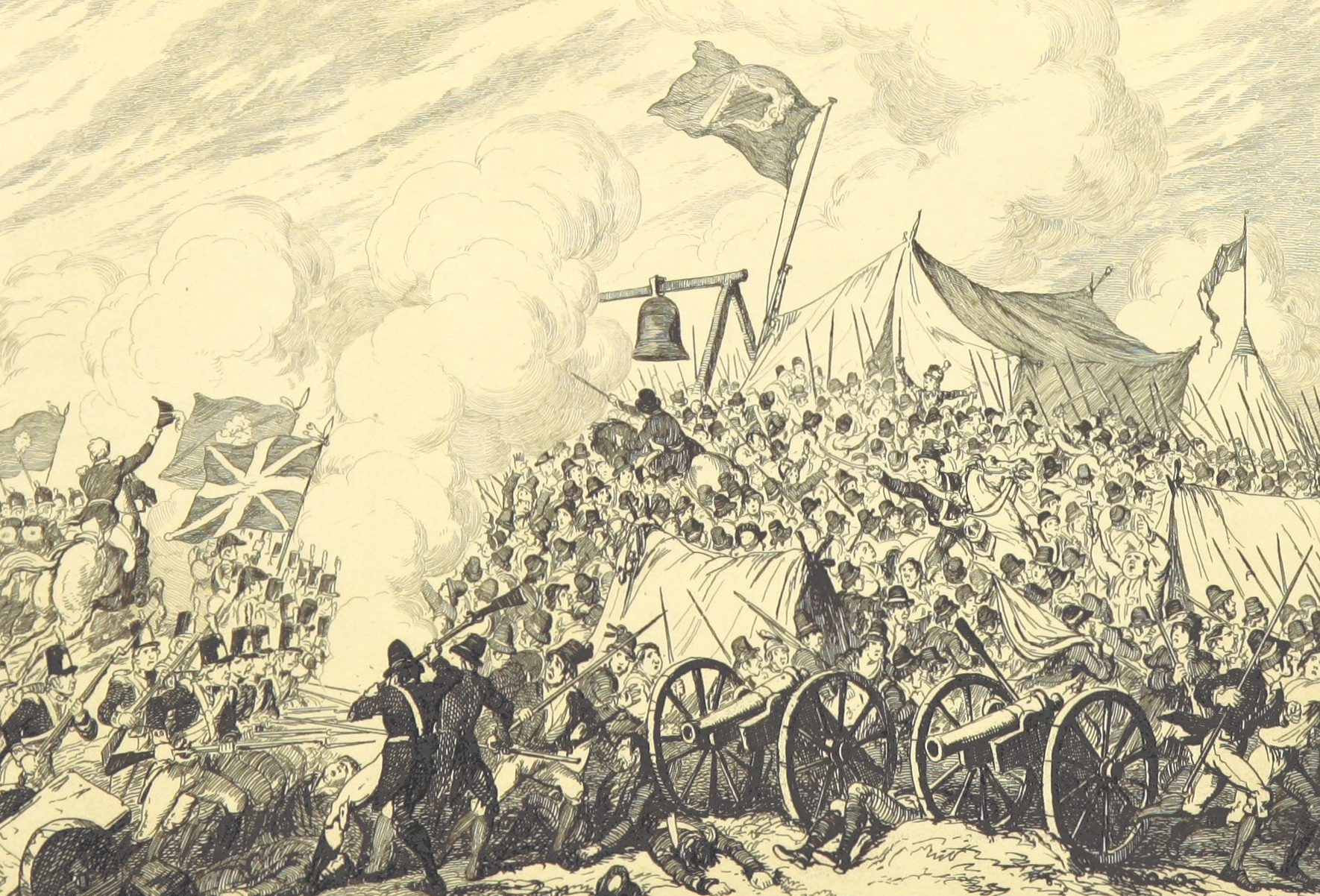
The Battle of Vinegar Hill, which the regiment fought in

The expected Irish Rebellion broke out in 1798. At the time the Light Company of the Wicklow Militia, commanded by Captain William Richardson, was stationed at Dunlavin, and took part in the defence of the town on 24 and 25 May. As the rebellion developed, the Wicklow Company with the 1st Light Battalion was heavily engaged in the operations against the rebels in County Kildare and then moved into County Wicklow. It was part of the force assembled by Lt-Gen Gerard Lake to take the main rebel camp at Vinegar Hill, forming part of David Dundas's column. The battalion was in contact with the rebels at Kilcavan Hill on 18 June, and then formed the advanced guard at the decisive Battle of Vinegar Hill on 21 June, storming the rebel position on the heights.

Meanwhile, on 23 June the rest of the Wicklow Militia marched out of Kilkenny, where it was stationed, as part of a force under Major-General Sir Charles Asgill sent to retake Castlecomer, which had fallen into rebel hands. The militia then extinguished the fires that had been lit in the town. On 26 June Asgill's force attacked a body of rebels estimated at 4000 strong at Kilconnell Hill and overran it, killing many and capturing 14 cannon and other stores. The regiment received praise for its conduct in these two actions.. However, it also gained a reputation for brutality, awith notable atrocities carried out by Lieutenant Edward Lambert Hepenstall during and after the rebellion.

Vinegar Hill broke the back of the rebellion; the Wicklow Militia was not engaged in the final part of the campaign against the French force that landed in August, too late to change the outcome. Later in the year the regiment marched through Limerick to Ennis and Clarecastle. By March 1799 it was stationed at Birr.

With the diminishing threat of invasion after 1799, the strength of the militia could be reduced. At the beginning of 1800 the surplus men were encouraged to volunteer for regiments of the line, and more than a quarter of the Wicklow Militia did so. In March 1800 the light battalions were reformed, the Wicklow Militia being warned to make sure that its light company comprised men who had served before. A composite corps of pioneers under the Quartermaster-General was also formed by detachments from the regiments. Each detachment comprised one subaltern, one sergeant, one corporal and 20 picked men, who received extra pay for the work. The Wicklow contingent served in the '3rd Division'.

In the autumn of 1801 the Wicklow Militia was stationed at Boyle. By then peace negotiations with the French were progressing, and recruiting and re-enlistment for the Irish Militia was stopped in October. The men received the new clothing they were due on 25 December, but the Treaty of Amiens was signed in March 1802 after which the regiments were disembodied. The men of the Wicklow Militia were paid off in May, leaving only the permanent staff of 70 non-commissioned officers (NCOs) and drummers under the regimental adjutant.

=== Napoleonic Wars ===
However, the Peace of Amiens was short-lived, and on 3 January 1803 the commanding officers (COs) of militia regiments were authorised to enrol recruits to bring their regiments up to establishment strength. The Militia was called out on 15 March, the Wicklow regiment being re-embodied on 25 March 1803.

By March the following year the regiment was stationed at Bantry, with detachments at Bearhaven and Skibbereen, and the light company detached to Bandon as part of a new light battalion. In April 1804 the men of the Wicklow Light Company volunteered to extend their service to any part of Great Britain, but the offer was not taken up. By March 1805 the regimental headquarters (HQ) had moved to Clonmel. At this time the establishment was increased to 100 men per company, with a view to encouraging men to volunteer for the regulars. By September 1805 regimental HQ was at Ballinrobe, at Castlebar in March 1806, and at Athlone in June that year. In July 1806 the light battalions were broken up and the companies rejoined their regiments. The regiment was still at Athlone in November 1806 but had moved to Nenagh by June 1807. Militiamen were still being encouraged by generous bounties to transfer to the regulars (the 1807 quota from the Wicklow Militia volunteered for the 37th Foot stationed at Limerick) and in some cases the ballot had to be used to replace them. Wicklow was divided into four groups of parishes: one district raised all its quota (35 men) by ballot, in another only one parish balloted, for 5 men; the other two districts were able to obtain sufficient voluntary recruits.

The Wicklow Militia moved to Drogheda at the end of 1807 or beginning of 1808, and remained there for over two years, moving to Dublin in April 1810, where it remained part of the garrison for nearly a year. On 18–20 February 1811 the regiment marched in three 'divisions' from Dublin to Killarney, where it stayed until July 1812. It then transferred to Bandon, with detachments stationed at Listowel, Millstreet and Clonakilty. The strength of the regiment by November was 547 other ranks (ORs) out of an establishment of 600. In January 1813 it began moving by divisions to Cork, two companies not arriving until mid-February. On 5 and 7 April the regiment marched in two divisions to Clonmel, and then dispersed small detachments to surrounding villages. Late in the year Maj James Edwards was left in charge of regimental HQ at Clonmel while Col William Forward, Lt-Col Robert Howard and the adjutant were all absent on recruiting duty in Co Wicklow. By January 1814 HQ was at Birr. Napoleon abdicated on 6 April 1814, and militia recruiting was halted on 27 April, Lt-Col Howard returning to Birr to resume command of the Wicklow Militia. The regiment marched out of Birr on 22 July, reaching Wicklow on 26 July, where it was disembodied on 1–2 August.

Napoleon escaped from Elba early in 1815 and the Militia was re-embodied, the Wicklow regiment opening recruitment on 4 May and the recruits being embodied on 25 May, the rest of the regiment on 13 July. Although the short Waterloo Campaign had already ended by then, the bulk of the Regular Army remained abroad on occupation duty for some months. The Wicklow Militia was deployed to Derry from October 1815 to March 1816, when it returned to Wicklow and was disembodied on 29 March.

=== Long Peace ===
After Waterloo there was a long peace. Although officers continued to be commissioned into the militia and ballots might still be held, the regiments were rarely assembled for training and their permanent staff (originally 74 warrant officers, non-commissioned officers (NCOs) and drummers under the adjutant) for the Wicklow regiment) were progressively reduced. The regimental HQ of the Wicklow Militia moved from Wicklow to Arklow on 28 March 1817. The permanent staff were occasionally used in support of the civil powers – the Wicklow staff were permanently employed in this way (on full pay) between December 1821 and January 1823.

The Col Forward (now 4th Earl of Wicklow), who had held the colonelcy of the disembodied regiment since 1810, resigned on 29 April 1833, and was succeeded in command by his kinsman Robert Howard of Castle Howard, Wicklow, who had been lieutenant-colonel even longer. However, he died the following year and Sir Ralph Howard, 1st Baronet of Bushey Park, Wicklow, son of Hugh Howard and nephew of 2nd and 3rd Earls of Wicklow, was promoted to the command on 1 October 1834.

== Wicklow Rifles ==
The Militia of the United Kingdom was revived by the Militia Act 1852, enacted during a period of international tension. As before, units were raised and administered on a county basis, and filled by voluntary enlistment (although conscription by means of the Militia Ballot might be used if the counties failed to meet their quotas). Training was for 56 days on enlistment, then for 21–28 days per year, during which the men received full army pay. Under the act, Militia units could be embodied by royal proclamation for full-time home defence service in three circumstances:

1. 'Whenever a state of war exists between Her Majesty and any foreign power'.
2. 'In all cases of invasion or upon imminent danger thereof'.
3. 'In all cases of rebellion or insurrection'.

The regiment was reformed as the Wicklow Rifles with four companies in 1855. The appointment of colonel in the militia lapsed after the 1852 reforms, and Sir Ralph Howard became Honorary Colonel, with Edward Bayly, a former captain in the 34th Foot, as Lieutenant-Colonel Commandant.

=== Crimean War ===
The outbreak of the Crimean War in 1854 and the despatch of an expeditionary force led to the militia being called out for home defence. The Wicklow Rifles were embodied on 27 January 1855. Recruits only came in slowly, and it was not until 28 November that the regiment finally left Wicklow for its war station at Cork. The war was ended by the Treaty of Paris of 30 March 1856, and the militia prepared to be disembodied. The Wicklow Rifles marched to Wexford at the end of June where it stayed a month before returning to Co Wicklow on 5 July. It was disembodied on 11 August 1856.

In July 1858 the regiment assembled at Arklow for its 21 days' annual training. On 3 November that year the permanent staff moved back to Wicklow, where a storehouse and office in Main Street were hired for the regimental HQ by the county. Subsequently, the annual training (21 or 27 days) was held each May at Wicklow until 1865. During the Fenian crisis training was suspended, and the permanent staff mounted guard on the armoury until June 1870. Training resumed at Wicklow in May 1871 for 35 days, following 21 days' preliminary training for the recruits. In subsequent years the preliminary drill lasted 56 days, followed by the main 27-day training period.

The militia regiments now had a large cadre of permanent staff (about 30) and a number of the officers were former Regulars. Around a third of the recruits and many young officers went on to join the Regular Army. The Militia Reserve introduced in 1867 consisted of present and former militiamen who undertook to serve overseas in case of war.

=== Cardwell Reforms ===
Under the 'Localisation of the Forces' scheme introduced by the Cardwell Reforms of 1872, militia regiments were brigaded with their local linked regular regiments. For the Wicklow Rifles this was in Sub-District No 66 (Counties of Dublin, Wicklow, Kildare and Carlow) in Dublin District of Irish Command:

- 102nd Regiment of Foot (Royal Madras Fusiliers)
- 103rd Regiment of Foot (Royal Bombay Fusiliers)
- Carlow Militia at Carlow
- Kildare Militia at Naas
- Wicklow Rifles at Wicklow
- Royal Dublin City Militia at Dublin
- Dublin County Militia at Dublin
- No 66 Brigade Depot at Naas.

Although often referred to as brigades, the sub-districts were purely administrative organisations, but in a continuation of the Cardwell Reforms a mobilisation scheme began to appear in the Army List from December 1875. This assigned Regular and Militia units to places in an order of battle for the 'Active Army' or the 'Garrison Army', even though these formations were entirely theoretical, with no staff or services assigned. The Wicklow Militia's assigned war station was with the Garrison Army in the Portsmouth defences.

== Wicklow Artillery Militia ==
The 1852 Act had introduced Artillery Militia units in addition to the traditional infantry regiments. Their role was to man coastal defences and fortifications, relieving the Royal Artillery (RA) for active service. On 1 April 1877 the Wicklow Rifles were converted into the Wicklow Artillery Militia, with headquarters at Wicklow. The establishment was reduced to 360 men, forming four 90-strong batteries.

The annual training (including the new gunnery skills required) followed from 23 April that year. The Militia Reserve were called out in 1878 during the international crisis caused by the Russo-Turkish War. From 1879 the annual training was carried out in a tented camp, using The Murrough near Wicklow, rather than having the men billeted in the town. For the 1880 training enough recruits came forward finally to complete the unit to its full establishment; however permission was refused to increase the establishment to five batteries. Owing to the unsettled state of Ireland during the Home Rule debate, no training was held by the Wicklow Artillery in 1881 or 1882. In 1881 the regimental HQ was moved from the Main Street in Wicklow to the 'Marine Hotel' on the Murrough, which was converted into a barracks.

The Royal Artillery (RA) was reorganised in 1882, and 11 territorial divisions of garrison artillery were formed, each with a brigade of regular artillery. The Militia Artillery was assigned to form the junior brigades of these divisions, the Wicklow Artillery becoming 7th Brigade, North Irish Division, RA, on 1 April 1882. Although the Army List stated that the brigade consisted of the Wicklow Artillery', its contemporary historian regretted that the old title could not be used more widely, particularly when recruiting. In 1888 the 7th Brigade absorbed some of the permanent staff from the disbanded 5th Brigade, North Irish Division, (the Galway Militia Artillery) and the Wicklow unit's establishment was raised to six batteries in February that year.

On 1 July 1889 the garrison artillery was reorganised again into three large territorial divisions (Eastern, Southern and Western). The assignment of units to them seemed geographically arbitrary, with all the Irish militia units being grouped in the Southern Division, for example, but this related to where the need for coastal artillery was greatest, rather than where the units recruited. The Wicklow unit became the Wicklow Artillery (Southern Division). In 1899 the garrison artillery units formally became the Royal Garrison Artillery (RGA).

=== Second Boer War ===
During the Second Boer War militia artillery units were embodied to replace regular troops sent to South Africa. The Wicklow Artillery was embodied from 11 May to 9 October 1900

The Wicklow Artillery formally became the Wicklow Royal Garrison Artillery (Militia) in 1902.

== Disbandment ==
After the Boer War, the future of the Militia was called into question. There were moves to reform the Auxiliary Forces (Militia, Yeomanry and Volunteers) to take their place in the six Army Corps proposed by St John Brodrick as Secretary of State for War. Some batteries of Militia Artillery were to be converted to Royal Field Artillery (RFA). However, little of Brodrick's scheme was carried out.

Under the sweeping Haldane Reforms of 1908, the Militia was replaced by the Special Reserve (SR), a semi-professional force whose role was to provide reinforcement drafts for Regular units serving overseas in wartime, rather like the former Militia Reserve. All 12 officers and 378 of the 456 ORs of the Wicklow RGA transferred to the SR and the unit became the Wicklow Royal Field Reserve Artillery (RFRA) on 24 May 1908. However, in a change of policy all the RFRA units were scrapped during 1909, the disbandment of the Wicklow unit being announced in October. Instead the men of the RFA Special Reserve would form Brigade Ammunition Columns for the Regular RFA brigades on the outbreak of war.

== Commanders ==
=== Colonels ===
The following served as Colonel of the Regiment:

- Robert Howard, Viscount Wicklow, backdated to 25 April 1793, resigned 7 August 1797
- Hon Hugh Howard, younger son of above, promoted 17 August 1797
- William Forward (previously Howard; Lord Clonmore from 1815, 4th Earl of Wicklow from 1818), appointed 25 September 1810; resigned 29 April 1833
- Robert Howard of Castle Howard, promoted 30 April 1833, died 1834
- Sir Ralph Howard, 1st Baronet of Bushey Park, Wicklow, son of Hugh Howard and nephew of 2nd and 3rd Earls of Wicklow, appointed 1 October 1834, became Hon Col 1852; resigned 9 December 1871

=== Lieutenant-Colonels ===
Lieutenant-Colonels of the regiment (COs from 1852) included:

- Robert Howard, 2nd Earl of Wicklow, appointed 25 April 1793, later promoted to colonel
- William Radcliffe, appointed 25 August 1797, removed 1809
- Robert Howard of Castle Howard, Wicklow, promoted 13 May 1809; promoted to col 30 April 1833
- William Acton, MP for Wicklow, promoted 30 April 1833; died 1854]
- Edward Symes Bayly, former captain, 34th Foot, appointed Lt-Col Commandant 8 August 1854, retired 7 March 1872
- R.A. Gun-Cuninghame, first commissioned into the Wicklow Militia as a captain in 1840, promoted March 1872, died 12 May 1880
- Edward R. Bayly, formerly 3rd Foot, promoted 24 May 1880
- Henry E.W. de Robeck, former captain, Royal Artillery, appointed 25 April 1892
- W.H.O. Kemmis, retired regular army major, appointed 13 May 1905

=== Honorary Colonels ===
The following served as Honorary Colonel of the regiment:

- Sir Ralph Howard, 1st Baronet, from 1852; resigned 9 December 1871
- Charles Howard, 5th Earl of Wicklow, former lieutenant, 11th Hussars, appointed 11 December 1871, died 20 June 1881
- Charles George Tottenham, MP, former lieutenant-colonel, Scots Fusilier Guards, appointed 17 August 1881

=== Other notable officers ===
Other notable officers included:

- Charles Ashmore, commissioned as ensign 26 December 1812, transferred to the 88th Foot 25 December 1813; later commanded the troops in Jamaica and subsequently promoted to General
- Hon William Proby (later 5th Earl of Carysfort and Lord Lieutenant of Co Wicklow), commissioned as captain 16 May 1861, retired 26 March 1872
- Charles Stewart Parnell, commissioned as lieutenant 25 February 1865, retired 1870; later leader of the Home Rule League
- Mervyn Wingfield, 7th Viscount Powerscourt, commissioned as a lieutenant 26 November 1870, promoted to captain 31 March 1871, retired 12 October 1871
- Cecil Howard, 6th Earl of Wicklow, former captain 60th Rifles, joined Antrim Artillery as captain 26 July 1879, transferred to Wicklow Artillery as major 23 February 1881, retired 8 August 1884

== Heritage & ceremonial ==
=== Uniforms & insignia ===
The Wicklow Militia wore a red coat with black facings. The Wicklow Rifles retained black facings on their Rifle green jackets. On conversion to artillery the corps adopted the blue uniform and red facings of the Royal Artillery. From 1882 to 1889 the officers wore the standard North Irish Division helmet plate with 'WICKLOW ARTILLERY' on the lower scroll. Around 1900 the uniform bore the embroidered shoulder title 'WICKw', and about 1907 the ORs bore the brass titles 'RGA' over 'WICKLOW' on the shoulder straps of the khaki service dress.

=== Precedence ===
On the outbreak of the French Revolutionary War the English counties had drawn lots to determine the relative precedence of their militia regiments. In 1798 the new Irish militia regiments received their own table of precedence, in which County Wicklow came 37th. In 1833 King William IV drew the lots to determine an order of precedence for the whole of the United Kingdom. Those regiments raised before 1783 took the first 69 places, followed by the 60 regiments (including those in Ireland) raised for the French Revolutionary War: the Wicklow Militia took 92nd place, and this remained unchanged when the list was updated in 1855. When the Wicklow Rifle converted to artillery in 1877, the unit was put at the end of the artillery militia list, at 34th. Most regiments took little notice of the numeral.

== See also ==
- Irish Militia
- Militia (United Kingdom)
- North Irish Division, Royal Artillery
- Militia Artillery units of the United Kingdom and Colonies
