= Galway Militia Artillery =

Auxiliary unit of the British Army

Galway Militia Artillery 5th Brigade, North Irish Division, RA
- Active: 1854–1888
- Country: United Kingdom
- Branch: Militia
- Role: Garrison Artillery
- Part of: North Irish Division, RA
- Garrison/HQ: Galway

The Galway Militia Artillery was a part-time reserve unit of Britain's Royal Artillery based in County Galway, Ireland, from 1854 to 1888.

== Background ==
The long-standing national Militia of the United Kingdom was revived by the Militia Act 1852, enacted during a period of international tension. As before, units were raised and administered on a county basis, and filled by voluntary enlistment (although conscription by means of the Militia Ballot might be used if the counties failed to meet their quotas). Training was for 56 days on enlistment, then for 21–28 days per year, during which the men received full army pay. Under the Act, Militia units could be embodied by Royal Proclamation for full-time home defence service in three circumstances:

1. 'Whenever a state of war exists between Her Majesty and any foreign power'.
2. 'In all cases of invasion or upon imminent danger thereof'.
3. 'In all cases of rebellion or insurrection'.

The 1852 Act introduced Militia Artillery units in addition to the traditional infantry regiments. Their role was to man coastal defences and fortifications, relieving the Royal Artillery (RA) for active service.

== History ==
The unit was officially formed in December 1854 under the title of Galway Militia Artillery, but unlike many other Militia units it was not embodied during the Crimean War or Indian Mutiny, and no officers were appointed to it. The first commandant was Captain O'Hara, late of the 2nd Dragoon Guards (Queen's Bays), who assumed command on 5 June 1878 and was commandant throughout the unit's remaining existence.

The Artillery Militia was reorganised into 11 divisions of garrison artillery in 1882, and the Galway unit became the 5th Brigade, North Irish Division, RA.

The establishment of the unit was set at 414 for its four batteries, but the enrolled strength was always well below that, 286 being the highest number recorded (in 1886). This probably led to the unit's disbandment, which came in 1888. The permanent staff (one officer and 17 warrant officers, serjeants and trumpeters) transferred to the 4th (Dublin City) and 7th (Wicklow) Brigades of the North Irish Division, RA.
