= Ralph Howard, 1st Viscount Wicklow =

Irish politician and nobleman

The Right Honourable The Viscount Wicklow PC (I)
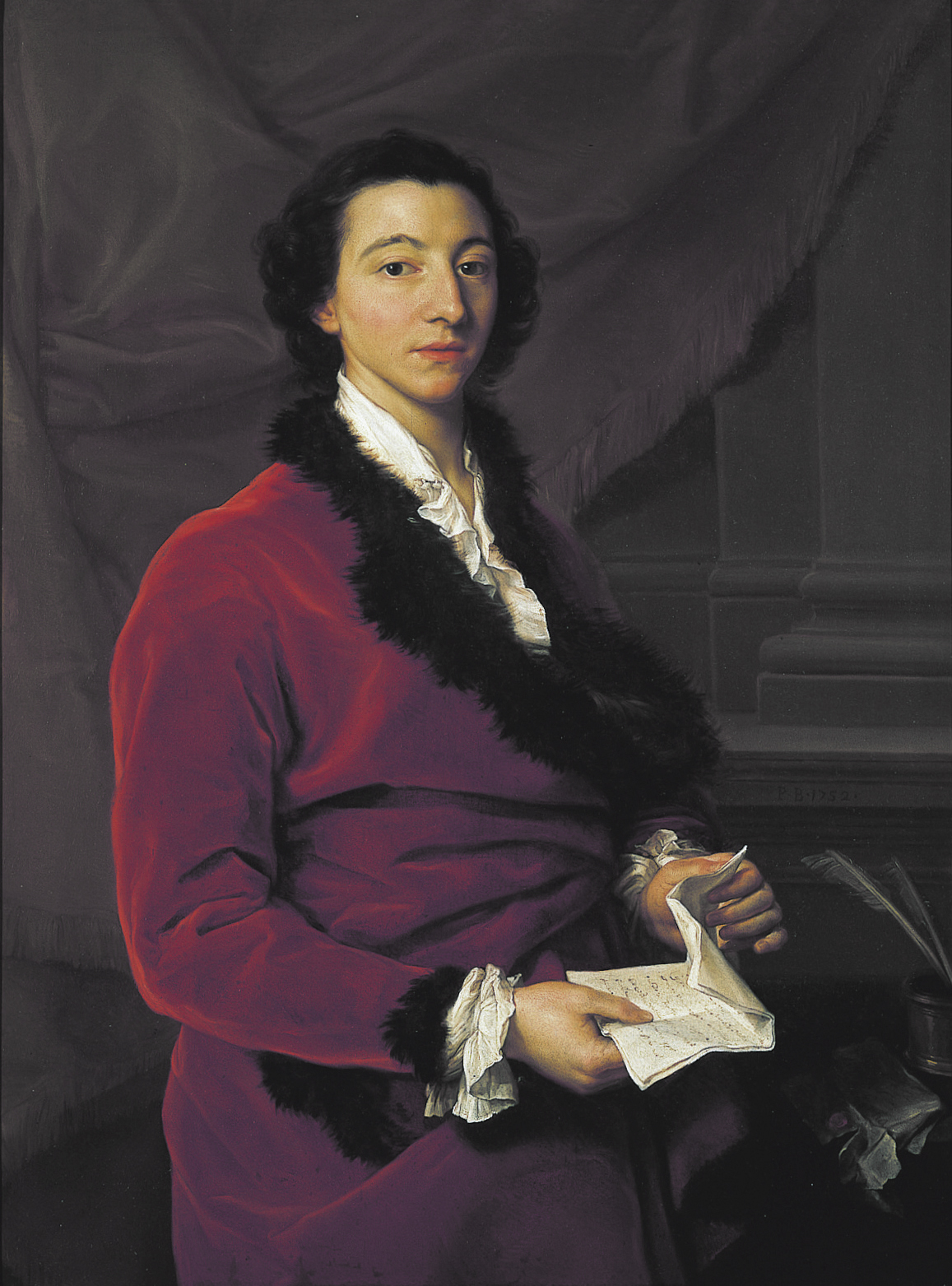
- Portrait of Viscount Wicklow by Pompeo Batoni, 1752

Member of Parliament for County Wicklow
- In office 1761–1776 Serving with Hon. Richard Wingfield, William Brabazon
- Preceded by: Anthony Brabazon; Richard Chapel Whaley
- Succeeded by: William Brabazon; Hon. John Stratford

Member of Parliament for St Johnstown
- In office 1768–1769 Serving with William Talbot
- Preceded by: William Forward; William Talbot
- Succeeded by: William Talbot; Hugh Howard
- In office 1761–1761 Serving with William Forward
- Preceded by: William Forward; Hon. George Hamilton
- Succeeded by: William Forward; William Talbot

Personal details
- Born: Ralph Howard; 29 August 1727 Shelton Abbey, County Wicklow
- Died: 26 June 1789 (aged 61) Dublin, Ireland
- Spouse: Alice Forward (m. 1755)
- Children: 11
- Parent(s): Robert Howard; Patience Boleyn

Ralph Howard, 1st Viscount Wicklow PC (I) (29 August 1727 – 26 June 1789) was an Anglo-Irish politician and nobleman.

== Early life ==
Ralph Howard was born on 29 August 1727 at Shelton Abbey, County Wicklow, the eldest son of seven children born to the former Patience Boleyn and the Rt. Rev. Robert Howard (1670–1740), Bishop of Elphin.

His paternal grandfather was Dr. Ralph Howard. His maternal grandparents were Godfrey Boleyn of Fennor, County Meath ( a distant connection of the family of Anne Boleyn), and Mary Singleton, sister of Henry Singleton, Chief Justice of the Irish Common Pleas.

== Career ==
Howard was High Sheriff of Wicklow in 1749, and of County Carlow in 1754. In 1761 and 1768 he was elected MP for both County Wicklow and the borough of St Johnstown, choosing to sit for the county.

In May 1770, he was appointed to the Privy Council of Ireland and on 12 July 1776 Howard was raised to the Peerage of Ireland as Baron Clonmore of Clonmore Castle, County Carlow. In June 1785 he was further honoured as Viscount Wicklow, but died a year later.

== Personal life ==
On 11 August 1755, Howard was married to Alice Forward, the daughter and sole heiress of William Forward of Castle Forward in County Donegal, and the former Isabella Stewart. Together, they were the parents of eleven children, including:

- Robert Howard, 2nd Earl of Wicklow (1757–1815), a Representative Peer for Ireland from 1800 to 1815 who died unmarried.
- William Howard, 3rd Earl of Wicklow (1761–1818), who married Eleanor Caulfeild, the only daughter of Hon. Francis Caulfeild MP (second son of James Caulfeild, 3rd Viscount Charlemont) and the former Hon. Mary Eyre (only daughter and heiress of John Eyre, 1st Baron Eyre).
- Hon. Hugh Howard (1761–1840), an MP who married Catharine Bligh, second daughter of Very Rev. Robert Bligh, Dean of Elphin, in 1792.
- Hon. Henry Howard (d. 1793), who died in battle in Flanders.
- Lady Mary Howard (d. 1798), who married Rev. Thomas Hore, second son of Walter Hore of Harperstown, in 1797.

Lord Wicklow died on 26 June 1789 at his house in Rutland Square in Dublin. His widow was created Countess of Wicklow in her own right on 20 December 1793. She died on 7 March 1807. Their son, Robert Howard, succeeded her as Earl of Wicklow. Their great-grandnephew Ralph Howard became the seventh Earl of Wicklow.

=== Legacy ===
Howard's grave site, the Howard Mausoleum, has become a landmark due to the large pyramid style marker.

Parliament of Ireland
Preceded by Anthony Brabazon; Richard Chapel Whaley	Member of Parliament for County Wicklow; 1761–1776; With: Hon. Richard Wingfield 1761–1765; William Brabazon 1765–1776	Succeeded by William Brabazon; Hon. John Stratford
Preceded by William Forward; Hon. George Hamilton	Member of Parliament for St Johnstown; 1761; With: William Forward	Succeeded by William Forward; William Talbot
Preceded by William Forward; William Talbot	Member of Parliament for St Johnstown; 1768–1769; With: William Talbot	Succeeded by William Talbot; Hugh Howard
Peerage of Ireland
New creation	Viscount Wicklow; 1785–1786	Succeeded by Robert Howard
New creation	Baron Clonmore; 1776–1786	Succeeded by Robert Howard
