= Hugh Howard (1731–1799) =

Irish politician

Hugh Howard (1731 – 27 October 1799) was an Anglo-Irish politician.

He served in the Irish House of Commons as the Member of Parliament for St Johnstown between 1769 and 1783.

Parliament of Ireland
Preceded by William Talbot; Ralph Howard	Member of Parliament for St Johnstown; 1769–1783; With: William Talbot (1769–1776); Robert Howard (1776–1783)	Succeeded by Hon. Robert Howard; Hon. William Forward-Howard
