= Robert Howard (bishop) =

Church of Ireland bishop

Styles of Robert Howard, D.D.
- Reference style: The Right Reverend
- Spoken style: My Lord
- Religious style: Bishop

Robert Howard, D.D. (October 1670 – 3 April 1740) was an Anglican prelate who served in the Church of Ireland as the Bishop of Killala and Achonry (1727–1730) and Bishop of Elphin (1730–1740).

Born in October 1670, he was the son of Ralph Howard, M.D. In 1703, Robert Howard became a fellow of Trinity College, Dublin. He was appointed Vicar of St. Ann's Church, Dublin in November 1717, then Curate of St. Bride's Church, Dublin. He was then appointed a Prebendary of St Patrick's Cathedral, Dublin in 1712, and Dean of Ardagh in 1722, Precentor of Christ Church, Dublin in March 1723, and Chancellor of St. Patrick's, Dublin and Vicar of Finglas in April 1723. He was nominated Bishop of Killala and Achonry on 14 January 1727 and consecrated on 19 March 1727. Three years later, he was appointed Bishop of Elphin by letters patent on 13 January 1730.

He married Patience Boleyn, only daughter of Godfrey Boleyn of Fennor, County Meath, and Mary Singleton, sister of Henry Singleton, Chief Justice of the Irish Common Pleas. They had seven children. The Boleyn family of Meath were distant cousins of Queen Anne Boleyn.

He was lineal ancestor of the Earls of Wicklow, his son Ralph having been created Baron Clonmore in 1776 and Viscount Wicklow in 1785.

Bishop Howard died in office on 3 April 1740, aged 69, and was buried in St. Bride's Church, Dublin.

== Bibliography ==
- Murdoch, Tessa, ed. (2022). Great Irish Households: Inventories from the Long Eighteenth Century. Cambridge: John Adamson ISBN 978-1-898565-17-8 OCLC 1233305993. See pp. 89–103 for transcripts of the inventories of goods drawn up on Robert Howard's death to sell to Edward Synge, his successor as bishop of Elphin. Interestingly the nearly 400 books listed as being in the study were not given a value.

Church of Ireland titles
Preceded by Charles Cobbe	Bishop of Killala and Achonry; 1727–1730	Succeeded by Robert Clayton
Preceded by Theophilus Bolton	Bishop of Elphin; 1730–1740	Succeeded by Edward Synge
