= Thomas Chamberlayne (cricketer) =

English cricketer and yachtsman

Personal information
- Full name: Thomas Chamberlayne
- Relatives: Tankerville Chamberlayne (Son), Denzil Chamberlayne (Son)

Domestic team information
- Years: Team
- 1844: Marylebone Cricket Club
- 1842–1849: Hampshire

Career statistics
Competition	FC
Matches	14
Runs scored	53
Batting average	2.65
100s/50s	0/0
Top score	24
Balls bowled	–
Wickets	–
Bowling average	–
5 wickets in innings	–
10 wickets in match	–
Best bowling	–
Catches/stumpings	5/–
- Source: Cricinfo, 15 February 2010

Thomas Chamberlayne (1805 – 21 October 1876) was an English first-class cricketer and yachtsman.

== Early life ==
He was born 12 April 1805 at Charlton, Kent, the son of the Rev. Thomas Chamberlayne and Maria Francesca Walker.

His uncle William Chamberlayne (1760–1829) was Member of Parliament for Southampton from 1818 until his death. Whilst serving the town, William Chamberlayne was also chairman of the company supplying gas lighting to the town of Southampton and donated the iron columns for the new gas street-lights. In 1822, the townspeople erected a memorial consisting of an iron Doric column; this now stands in Houndwell Park, near the city centre.

== Career ==
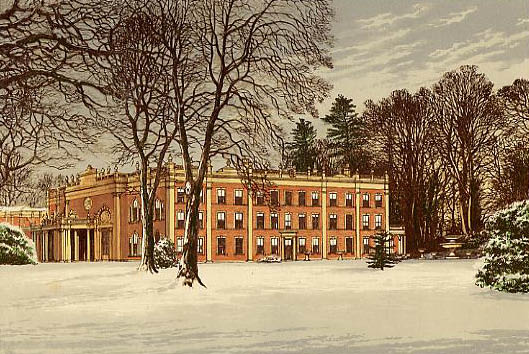
Cranbury Park in Hampshire, England: coloured woodcut from Morris's Country Seats (1880)

Chamberlayne served as High Sheriff of Hampshire in 1833.

=== Cricket career ===
In 1842 three local gentlemen, Chamberlayne, Sir Frederick Hervey-Bathurst and Sir John Barker-Mill, financed the development of the Antelope Ground in Southampton.

Chamberlayne made his first-class debut for Hampshire against Marylebone Cricket Club in 1842. From 1842 to 1849 Chamberlayne represented Hampshire in fourteen first-class matches, with his final first-class match coming against an All England Eleven in 1849.

Additionally, Chamberlayne played a single first-class match for the Marylebone Cricket Club against Petworth in 1844.

In his first-class career, Chamberlayne scored 53 runs at a very low batting average of 2.65, with a high score of 24.

=== Other interests ===
Chamberlayne's yacht the Arrow, took part in the inaugural America's Cup race in 1851.

Chamberlayne was a hunting and coursing enthusiast, who built both new stables and, as was his love for cricket, he built a cricket field at the family home at Cranbury Park.

In 1854 he put £400 towards the cost of building a church on Graham Street in Northam.

== Personal life ==
In 1830, Chamberlayne married Amelia Onslow (b 1812), the daughter of General Denzil Onslow (1770–1838), a former Grenadier Guards officer and an amateur cricketer. Together, they were the parents of:

- Denzil Thomas Chamberlayne (1834–1873), who took part in the Charge of the Light Brigade.
- Tankerville Chamberlayne (1840–1924), who also played first-class cricket for Hampshire as well as holding a keen interest in yachting. Tankerville was also a member of parliament, serving the Southampton constituency three times, as a Conservative. Following the 1895 General Election allegations were made concerning his conduct and this resulted in his being unseated.
- Amy Sophia Chamberlayne (b. 1842), who died young.
- Rosalie Amelia Chamberlayne (1845–1908), who married Sir Alexander Chichester, 2nd Baronet, son of Sir John Chichester, 1st Baronet. After his death, she married Sir Arthur Chichester, 8th Baronet, in 1883.
- Francesca Maria Chamberlayne (1844–1877), who married Cecil Howard, 6th Earl of Wicklow, son of Rev. Hon. Francis Howard and Sarah Hamilton, in 1876.
- Agnes Caroline Chamberlayne (1846–1925), who married Lt.-Col. George Charles Keppel Johnstone, son of Sir Frederick Johnstone, 7th Baronet and Lady Louisa Craven (a daughter of the 1st Earl of Craven), in 1875.

Chamberlayne died at his estate, Cranbury Park on 21 October 1876. Since he was predeceased by his eldest son Thomas in 1873, his second son, Tankerville inherited Cranbury Park.
