= William Howard, 3rd Earl of Wicklow =

Anglo-Irish politician and peer

The Right Honourable Earl of Wicklow
- Tenure: 1815–1818
- Predecessor: Robert Howard, 2nd Earl of Wicklow
- Successor: William Howard, 4th Earl of Wicklow
- Spouse: Eleanor Caulfeild (m. 1787)
- Issue: William Howard, 4th Earl of Wicklow; Reverend Francis Howard; Robert Howard; Isabella Mary Howard; Eleanor Howard; Mary Howard; Alicia Howard
- Father: Ralph Howard, 1st Viscount Wicklow
- Mother: Alice Howard, 1st Countess of Wicklow

William Howard, 3rd Earl of Wicklow PC (I) (January 1761 – 27 September 1818), known as William Forward between 1780 and 1815, was an Anglo-Irish politician and peer.

== Early life ==
Howard was the second son of Ralph Howard, 1st Viscount Wicklow and his wife, Alice Howard, 1st Countess of Wicklow. In 1780 he took the surname of Forward after succeeding to the estates of his mother's family.

== Career ==
Between 1783 and 1800 he served in the Irish House of Commons as the Member of Parliament for St Johnstown. In 1793 was made a member of the Privy Council of Ireland. From 1800 to 1808 he was Treasurer of the Irish Post Office and from 1814 Governor of Wicklow. He reverted his surname to Howard after succeeding his brother, Robert Howard, 2nd Earl of Wicklow, as Earl in 1815.

== Personal life ==
On 31 March 1787, he married Eleanor Caulfeild, the only daughter of Hon. Francis Caulfeild, MP. He was succeeded by his eldest son, William Howard.

== Bibliography ==
- Murdoch, Tessa, ed., Great Irish Households: Inventories from the Long Eighteenth Century. Cambridge: John Adamson, 2022 ISBN 978-1-898565-17-8 OCLC 1233305993. See pp. 229–34 for a transcript of the inventory of furniture drawn up for the 3rd earl, recording the Georgian house at Shelton Abbey just before its remodelling by the 4th earl as a Gothic house with crenellated parapets.

Parliament of Ireland
Preceded by Robert Howard; Hugh Howard	Member of Parliament for St Johnstown; 1783–1800; With: Robert Howard; Hon. Hugh Howard	Succeeded by Constituency disenfranchised
Peerage of Ireland
Preceded by Robert Howard	Earl of Wicklow; 1815–1818	Succeeded by William Howard
