= Alice Howard, 1st Countess of Wicklow =

Anglo-Irish peeress

The Right Honourable Countess of Wicklow
- Tenure: 1793–1807
- Predecessor: New creation
- Successor: Robert Howard, 2nd Earl of Wicklow
- Born: Alice Forward
- Died: 7 March 1807
- Spouse: Ralph Howard, 1st Viscount Wicklow (m. 1755; died 1789)
- Issue: Robert Howard, 2nd Earl of Wicklow; William Howard, 3rd Earl of Wicklow; Hon. Hugh Howard; Hon. Henry Howard; Lady Mary Howard

Alice Howard, 1st Countess of Wicklow (died 7 March 1807), née Alice Forward, was an Anglo-Irish peeress.

She was the daughter and heiress of William Forward of Castle Forward, County Donegal, by his wife Isabella Stewart. On 11 August 1755 she married the politician Ralph Howard, who was later created Baron Clonmore and Viscount Wicklow. Her husband died in 1789.

On 5 December 1793 she was created suo jure Countess of Wicklow in the Peerage of Ireland, with remainder to the heirs male of her body. Upon her death in 1807 she was succeeded by her eldest son, Robert Howard, who had already succeeded to his father's titles.

Peerage of Ireland
New creation	Countess of Wicklow; 1793–1807	Succeeded by Robert Howard
