= Hugh Howard (1761–1840) =

Anglo-Irish politician

The Honourable Hugh Howard

Member of Parliament for St Johnstown
- In office 1790–1800 Serving with Hon. William Forward-Howard
- Preceded by: Hon. Robert Howard; Hon. William Forward-Howard
- Succeeded by: Constituency disenfranchised

Personal details
- Born: 27 January 1761
- Died: 3 November 1840 (aged 79)
- Spouse(s): Catharine Bligh (after 1792)
- Relations: Granville Proby, 4th Earl of Carysfort (grandson); William Proby, 5th Earl of Carysfort (grandson)
- Children: 5, including Ralph, Theodosia
- Parent(s): Ralph Howard, 1st Viscount Wicklow; Alice Howard, 1st Countess of Wicklow

Hugh Howard (27 January 1761 – 3 November 1840), styled The Honourable from 1776, was an Anglo-Irish politician.

== Early life ==
Howard was born in 1761 as a younger son of Ralph Howard, 1st Viscount Wicklow and the former Alice Forward who was made suo jure Countess of Wicklow in 1793 after the death of his father. Among his siblings was Robert Howard, 2nd Earl of Wicklow, a Representative Peer for Ireland from 1800 to 1815 and William Howard, 3rd Earl of Wicklow.

== Career ==
Howard was elected to the Irish House of Commons as the Member of Parliament for St Johnstown in 1790, and held the seat until its disenfranchisement following the Acts of Union 1800.

On 29 December 1795 he was appointed Major and Brevet Lieutenant-Colonel in the Wicklow Militia commanded by his brother, Viscount Wicklow. When Viscount Wicklow resigned the command, Howard was promoted to substantive lieutenant-colonel and Colonel to succeed him on 17 August 1797. Howard retained the command until 1810.

== Personal life ==
On 20 December 1792, Howard was married to Catharine Bligh, the second daughter of Very Rev. Robert Bligh, Dean of Elphin. Together, they were the parents of:

- Sir Ralph Howard, 1st Baronet (1801–1873), an MP who married Charlotte Anne Fraser, the widow of Lt.-Col. Sir James John Fraser, 3rd Baronet, and only child of Daniel Craufurd, in 1837.
- Robert Howard (d. 1833)
- Frances Howard (d. 1814), who married William Parnell Hayes of Avondale in 1810.
- Isabella Howard (d. 1836), who married Granville Proby, 3rd Earl of Carysfort, in 1818.
- Theodosia Howard (d. 1836), who married, as his second wife, Richard Wingfield, 5th Viscount Powerscourt, in 1822.

Howard died on 3 November 1840.

Parliament of Ireland
Preceded by Hon. Robert Howard; Hon. William Forward-Howard	Member of Parliament for St Johnstown; 1790–1800; With: Hon. William Forward-Howard	Succeeded by Constituency disenfranchised
