= Clonmore Castle =

Ruined castle in County Carlow, Ireland

- Clonmore Castle

- Location within Ireland
- 52°49′42″N 6°34′19″W
- Location: Clonmore, County Carlow, Ireland

History
- Built: 13th century

Clonmore Castle is a 13th century Anglo-Norman castle located in Clonmore, County Carlow, Ireland. The castle is roughly square in plan with rectangular towers at the southern sides of the courtyard. Due to a lack of heritage preservation, most of the castle is now covered in ivy, and large gaps have appeared in the north and west walls. The building is now entirely empty with no trace of a stone floor.

The earliest record of the castle dates back to 1332, where Sir Anthony de Lacy carried out repairs to it. However, the shape of a trefoil window in the south wall suggests that it was built towards the end of the 13th century.
