= Shelton Abbey Prison =

Prison in County Wicklow, Ireland

Shelton Abbey
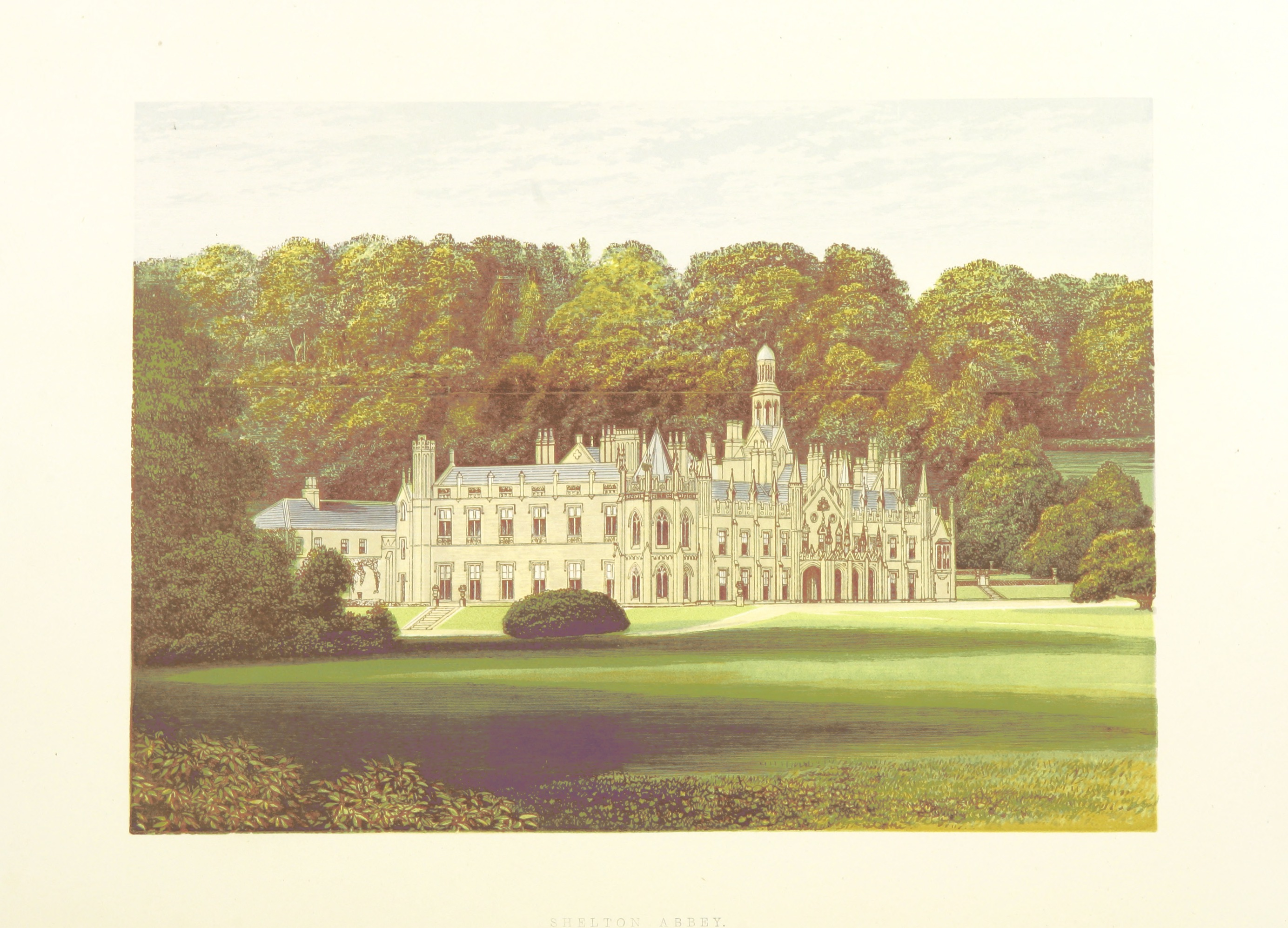
- 1860s drawing

- Location in Ireland
- Location: Arklow, County Wicklow; 52.815976°N 6.190734°W
- Status: Operational
- Security class: open prison
- Capacity: 115
- Population: 109 (August 2021)
- Opened: early 1970s
- Managed by: Irish Prison Service
- Governor: Mr. Joseph Donohue

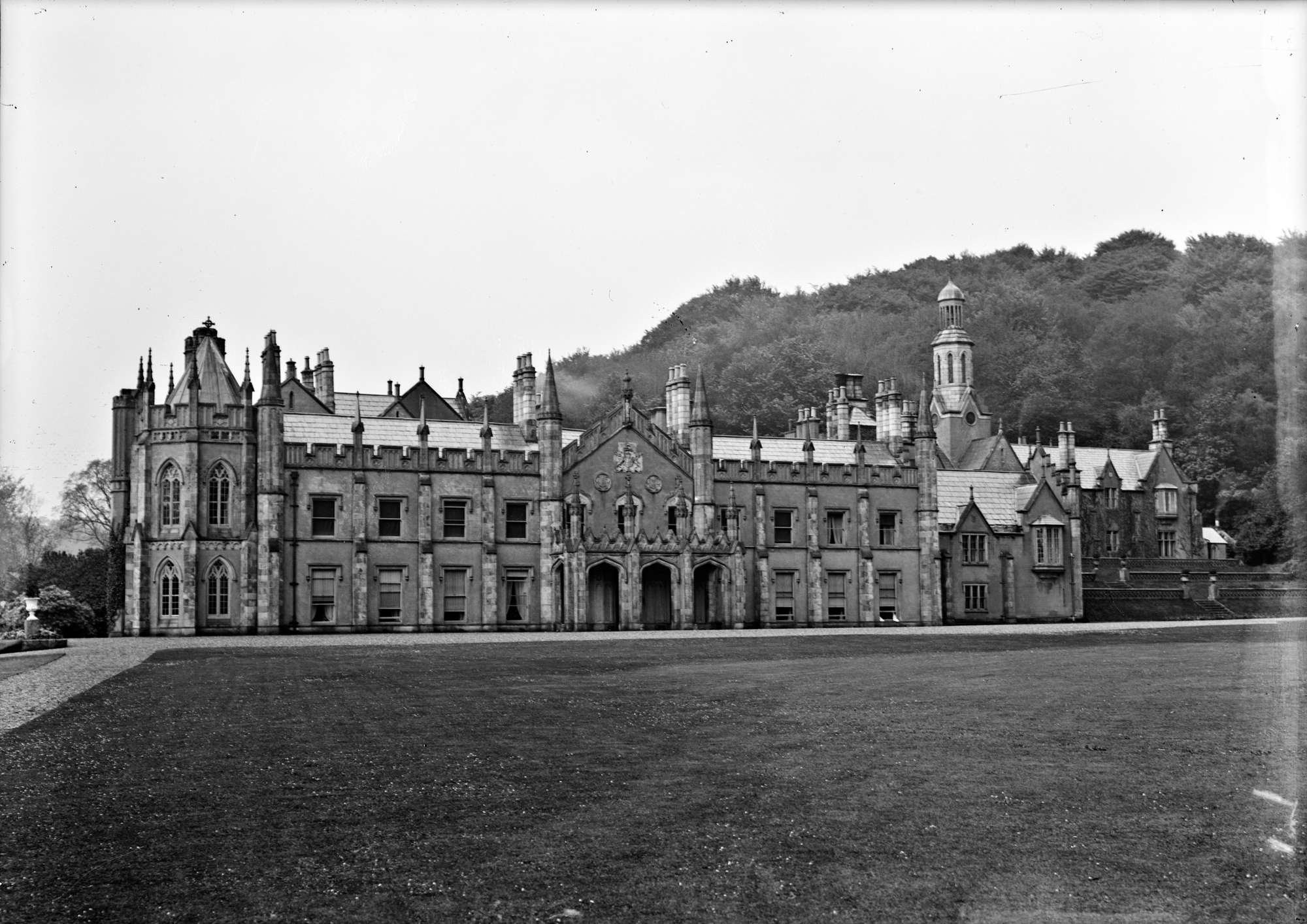
Shelton Abbey in the early 20th century

Shelton Abbey (Irish: Mainistir Shelton) on the north bank of the Avoca near Arklow County Wicklow, is a penal institution operated by the Irish Prison Service (IPS).

Shelton Abbey was the ancestral seat of the Earls of Wicklow until 1951 when financial difficulties forced William Howard, 8th Earl of Wicklow to sell the estate to the Irish State.

== History ==
In 1636, John Howard married Dorothea Hassels. They had one son together, Dr. Ralph Howard. Following John's death, Dorothea married her cousin Robert Hassells, owner of Shelton Abbey. They had no children, and Ralph inherited the estate.

In 1770, Dr. Howard's grandson, also named Ralph, converted the existing building on the estate into a two-storey redbrick building of 11 bays.

In 1776, Ralph was elevated to the peerage of Ireland, being made Baron Clonmore of Clonmore Castle. On 23 June 1785, he was further elevated in the peerage and became the first viscount of Wicklow. After his death, his wife, Alice Forward, was made Countess of Wicklow in her own right in 1793.

The current building is set in extensive grounds and replaced a previous less extensive country house which had, in 1690, accommodated the fleeing James II of England after the Battle of the Boyne.

The abbey was extensively remodelled in the Gothic style by the Irish architect, Sir Richard Morrison, in 1819. Despite its institutional role, the building retains much of the original internal and external fabric and architectural characteristics.

In the early 1840s the house and its demesne were described in Bartlett's The Scenery and Antiquities of Ireland as follows:

As the united streams which form the Avoca River approach the spot where their waters mingle with those of the sea, the vale expands, and the mountains subside into gentle undulations. Amidst this scenery, Shelton Abbey, the seat of the Earl of Wicklow, is beautifully situated on the northern bank of the Avoca. It stands at the base of a range of hills which rise gently around it, and are luxuriantly clothed with oak and birch-wood. The mansion is of considerable antiquity, and has recently received several important improvements, which have converted it into an appropriate baronial residence, resembling an abbey of the fourteenth century, with additions of a later date. The picturesque character of the edifice has a fine effect, and, with the surrounding scenery, forms one of the most charming landscapes of which this delightful county can boast. The demesne stretches for a considerable distance along the bank of the river, and is thickly studded with beech and chestnut-trees, some of which have attained an unusually noble growth.

== Prison ==
Since 1973, Shelton Abbey has been used as an open prison for males aged 19 years and over who are regarded as requiring lower levels of security.

In 1986, a lost 16th century artwork by Girolamo Muziano was rediscovered in the prison by an imprisoned art restorer.

As of August 2021, Shelton Abbey holds 109 prisoners.

Accommodation for most prisoners is in dormitories (catering for up to 100). There are a few prisoners serving life sentences and some of these have single room accommodation. During the period 2001 and 2009 the daily average number of prisoners held at Shelton Abbey has varied between 27 and 94. An additional accommodation wing, Avoca House, was opened in May 2009. This separate wing increased the capacity of the prison to 110.

No sex offenders or Immigration Warrant prisoners were held in custody at the prison during 2009.

Participation in courses organised by and through the Education Unit is double the rate of that in other Irish prisons The prison provides various activities and amenities for its inmates including but not limited to woodwork, arts and crafts, computers, French, English, maths, music, literacy, cookery, physical education, pottery and golf. In addition the staff seek to improve inmate welfare and mental health through group psychological programs such as "Anger Management" and "Emotional Awareness" and participation in such programs is high.

Other activities prisoners participate in include looking after livestock donated by farmers to the development agency Bóthar prior to their transport to farmers in Africa.

Notwithstanding the pleasant surroundings, generally good amenities and relaxed security, the rate of absconding by inmates is high (68 in 2009 of whom 56 were back in custody in higher security institutions at the end of the year) as are seizures of mobile phones from inmates and their visitors (103 in 2009 up from 72 in 2008). However this level of recalcitrance is attributed to the use of the prison by the IPS to transfer prisoners not so much inclined to reform than others as a means of reducing overcrowding at other prisons.

== Notable inmates ==
- Malcolm MacArthur
- Brian Meehan
- John Cunningham

== See also ==
- Prisons in Ireland
