= Lady Mary Fitzwilliam =

British aristocrat from the Fitzwilliam family (1845-1921)

Lady Mary Wentworth-Fitzwilliam
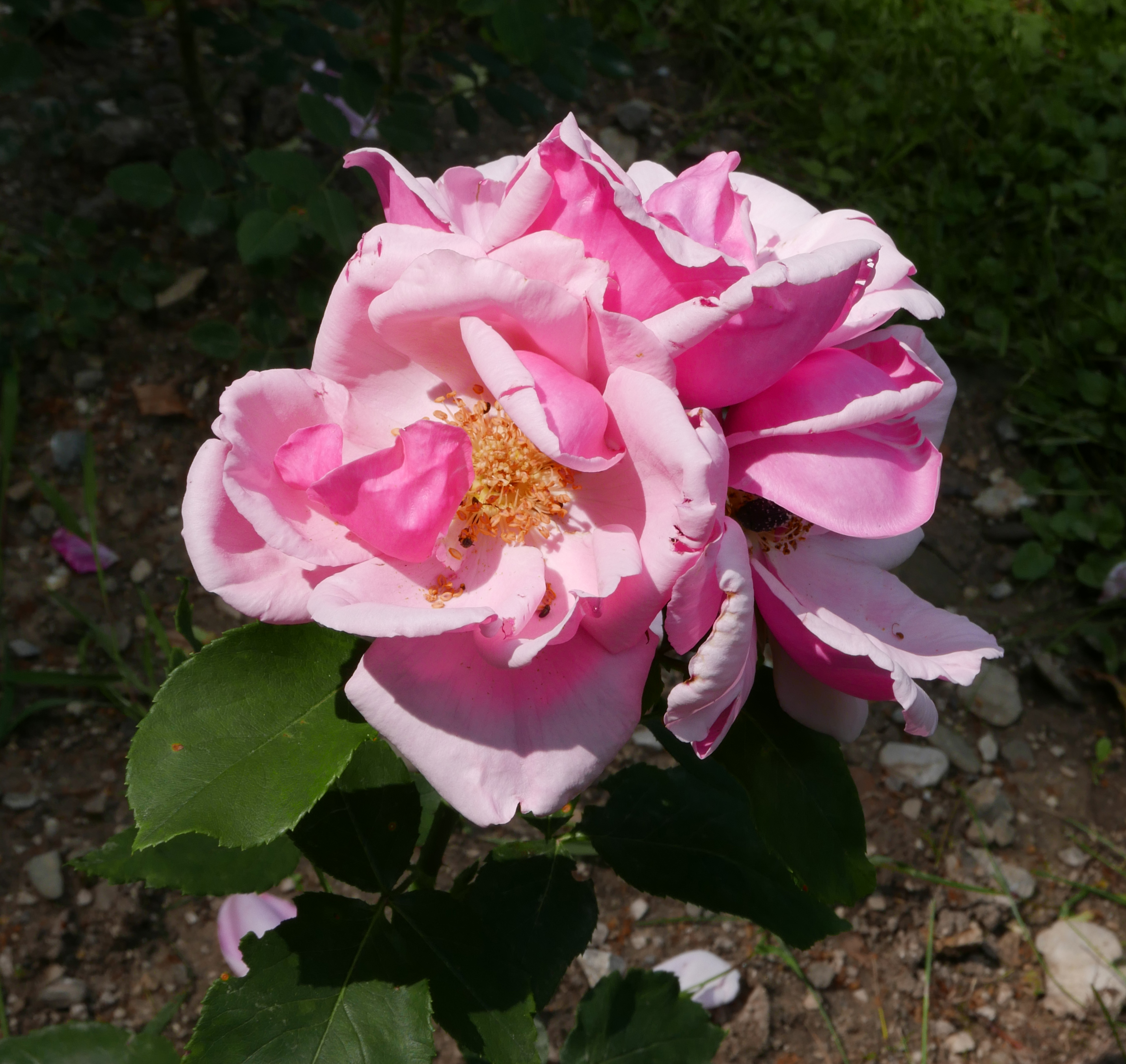
- Rosarium Baden Rosa 'Lady Mary Fitzwilliam'
- Born: 9 January 1845; Milton Hall, Northamptonshire, England
- Died: 1 July 1921 (aged 76); Lakeen Cottage, Shillelagh, County Wicklow, Ireland
- Spouse: Hugh Le Despencer Boscawen (m. 1872; died 1908)
- Parents: William Wentworth-Fitzwilliam (father); Lady Frances Harriet Douglas (mother)
- Relatives: William Wentworth-Fitzwilliam (brother); Henry Wentworth-FitzWilliam (brother); Charles Wentworth-Fitzwilliam (brother); Charles Wentworth-Fitzwilliam (paternal grandfather); George Douglas (maternal grandfather); Evelyn Boscawen (father-in-law)

Lady Mary Boscawen (née Wentworth-Fitzwilliam; (9 January 1845 – 1 July 1921) was a British aristocrat from the Fitzwilliam family.

Lady Mary was born in January 1845 at Milton Hall in Northamptonshire, to William Wentworth-Fitzwilliam, Viscount Milton (later 6th Earl Fitzwilliam) and Lady Frances Harriet Douglas, daughter of George Douglas, 17th Earl of Morton. She was one of eight train bearers at the wedding of Princess Helena's wedding to Prince Christian of Schleswig-Holstein on 5 July 1866 at Windsor Castle, Windsor, Berkshire, England.

On 23 May 1872, she married Hugh Le Despencer Boscawen (1849–1908), son of Evelyn Boscawen, 6th Viscount Falmouth (1819–1889).

Rosarian Henry Bennett (1823–1890) named the cultivar rosa 'Lady Mary Fitzwilliam', a hybrid tea rose, in her honour in 1882.

She died in 1921 at Lakeen Cottage in Shillelagh, County Wicklow, Ireland.
