= William Wentworth-Fitzwilliam =

William Wentworth-Fitzwilliam may refer to:

- William Fitzwilliam, 4th Earl Fitzwilliam (1748–1833), styled Viscount Milton until 1756, British Whig statesman
- William Wentworth-Fitzwilliam, 6th Earl Fitzwilliam (1815–1902), British peer and Liberal politician
- William Wentworth-Fitzwilliam, 7th Earl Fitzwilliam (1872–1943), British aristocrat
- William Wentworth-FitzWilliam, Viscount Milton (1839–1877), British nobleman, explorer and politician
- William Henry Wentworth-FitzWilliam (1840–1920), British Liberal, and later Liberal Unionist politician
