= Shillelagh branch line =

Irish rail line

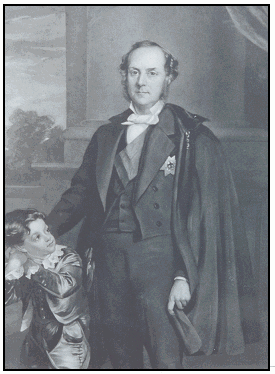
- Earl FitzWilliam, sponsor of the Shillelagh line to his Coolattin Estate

Overview
- Other name: The Fitzwilliam Railway

Technical
- Line length: 16.5 mi (26.6 km)
- Number of tracks: 1

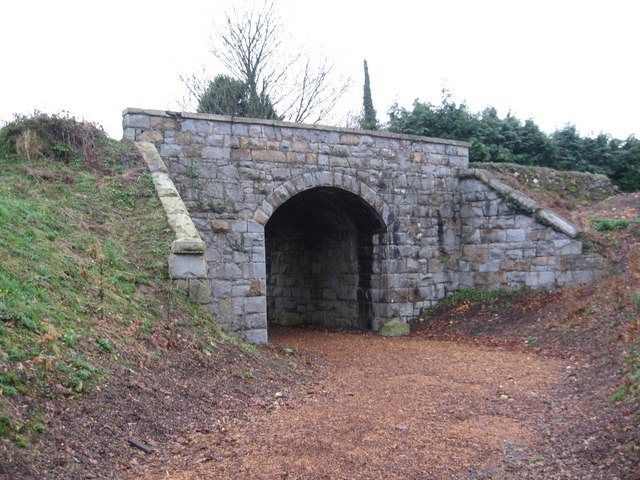
Old railway bridge at Tinahely

The Shillelagh branch line was a branch line of some 16.5 miles (26.6 km) to Shillelagh, County Wicklow opened by the Dublin, Wicklow and Wexford Railway (DW&WR) in 1865. It joined the Dublin–Rosslare railway line at Woodenbridge halt.

The single track line closely followed the course of the Aughrim River to Aughrim and then the Derry River to Shillelagh. A short spur from Aughrim served the Aughrim Flour Mills.

Passenger services ended in 1944 due to coal shortages which became critical during The Emergency, and though there were hopes of it re-opening this never happened. However, the line remained open for goods as far as Aughrim until 1952, serving Forgarty's Flour Mills. The line was officially closed and lifted the following year.

A walking trail was developed in 2005 on a 2.7km section of the old alignment near Tinahely.

== Fitzwilliam connection ==
In order for the DW&WR to continue its main line to Wexford it needed around 1860 to purchase lands from Earl Fitzwilliam. As part of those negotiations Lord Fitzwilliam hinted he desired a branch line to his home at Shillelagh on his Coolattin Estate. Following his agreement to donate land and other resources, the relevant bill was passed and construction of the branch line commenced in March 1864. For obvious reasons the line was also known as The Fitzwilliam Railway.

== Operations ==
The line was often allocated weaker or non-standard locomotives, in the period 1925 to 1930 the 0-6-0 No. 50, was allocated to the line.

== Stations ==
=== Woodenbridge ===
Woodenbridge Junction station (1865-1964) was originally an exchange platform between the Dublin to Rosslare main line and the start of the Shillelagh branch. It included its own branch platform, foot bridge, sidings, goods shed and turntable. Only the semi-derelict 1876 station house survives. By 1993 it had been relaid as a single track.

=== Aughrim ===
The railway to Aughrim was reached in January 1865. The station included a passing loop, goods shed, signal box, cattle pens and a short spur to Aughrim Flour Mills.

Both the station building and the goods shed have survived, as respectively, a private dwelling and a car dealership.

=== Ballinglen ===
Although the line reach Ballinglen by 1865, the station itself wasn't built until 1876, some eleven years later. This followed a complaint from the Fitzwilliam estate that the railway had reneged on a promise to build a station there. It was built for a cost of £90 and consisted of a modest station house and platform with no other facilities.

The station house survives as a private dwelling.

=== Tinahely ===
Tinhely station was a candidate for a branch to Hacketstown but in the end this did not come to pass.

It included a passing loop, signal box and goods shed.

The station house survives as a private dwelling.

=== Shillelagh Station ===
Shillelagh station opened on 22 May 1865 as the terminus. The Fitzwilliam Family of the Coolattin Estate had exclusive use of a private waiting room at the station.

The station included a signal box, goods shed, engine shed, sidings and two turntables.

The substantial station house survives as a private dwelling, as do some more modest staff cottages.
