= 1872 Southern West Riding of Yorkshire by-election =

UK Parliamentary by-election

The 1872 Southern West Riding of Yorkshire by-election was held on 8 July 1872. The by-election was fought due to the resignation of the incumbent Liberal MP, Viscount Milton. It was won by the Conservative candidate Walter Spencer-Stanhope, who was unopposed. The Conservatives retained this gain at the 1874 general election.
