= Lady Mary Fitzwilliam (née Butler) =

Lady Mary Wentworth-FitzWilliam (7 March 1846 – 17 January 1929), born Lady Mary Grace Louisa Butler, was a British aristocrat and courtier who was a member of the prominent Fitzwilliam and Butler dynasties. She was the daughter of John Butler, 2nd Marquess of Ormonde and Frances Jane Paget, and the wife of politician Henry Wentworth-FitzWilliam, the second son of William Wentworth-FitzWilliam, 6th Earl FitzWilliam and Lady Frances Harriet Douglas. Prior to her marriage, she served in the household of Queen Victoria's Russian daughter-in-law, Maria, Duchess of Edinburgh. The Duchess' daughter Queen Marie of Romania described Lady Mary as "my mother's dearest friend...until the end of her life," in her memoirs.

== Early life ==
Mary was born at Kilkenny Castle, Ireland, the ancestral home of the Earls and Marquesses of Ormonde. She was the third of six children born to Lord and Lady Ormonde; her father died in 1854, and her mother Frances, Dowager Marchioness of Ormonde took charge of the family estates during the minority of Mary's older brother James Butler, 3rd Marquess of Ormonde. Through her mother she was a grandchild of General The Hon. Sir Edward Paget and a great-grandchild of Henry Paget, 1st Earl of Uxbridge and George Legge, 3rd Earl of Dartmouth.

Mary was a debutante in the 1864 London season; she was presented at Court by her mother on 3 May to The Princess of Wales, who was deputising for Queen Victoria. Lady Mary is mentioned in the Journals of Lucy Lyttleton as being pursued by Viscount Milton, who was purported to be ‘desperately in love with her’, despite the fact that she ‘won’t have him’.

In November 1870 Mary was one of several young aristocratic women who were the subject of widespread coverage due to their selection as the bridesmaids of Queen Victoria's daughter Princess Louise, who married The Marquess of Lorne in March 1871.

Mary's older brother James had taken charge of the family estates following his 21st birthday in 1866, and by 1871 her mother had taken up residence at 17 Park Lane, London (later renumbered to 21 Park Lane).

== Royal Household ==
Prior to the marriage of Prince Alfred and Grand Duchess Marie it was announced that Lady Mary Butler would be appointed to the Duchess’ new household in Great Britain as a Lady of the Bedchamber. She was later promoted to the role of Lady in Waiting in February 1876. Following the appointment of The Duke of Edinburgh as commander of the British Mediterranean Fleet in early 1876, Lady Mary continue to be part of the household of the Duke and Duchess following their family's relocation to the San Anton Palace in Malta. She returned from Malta in early 1877, and was given the honour of dining with Queen Victoria and the Royal Family at Osborne House on 28 March of the same year. She resigned from her role as Lady-in-Waiting in April 1877, and was instead appointed as an extra-Lady-in-Waiting. Shortly after this, Lady Mary's engagement was announced on 25 May.

Lady Mary and the Duchess of Edinburgh developed as lasting friendship which endured following Lady Mary's departure from the Duchess' household. Queen Marie of Romania, the Duchess’s eldest daughter, later recalled Lady Mary as “my mother’s dearest friend... an attractive Irishwoman... without being a beauty she was full of charm, very clever, a delightful companion, amusing, gay, well-read, and for ever on the go, although her health was poor.” Marie noted that her mother “often used her as lady-in-waiting, though she never officially occupied that position,” and remarked on her prematurely grey, short-cropped hair, considered strikingly original for the period. She further remembered that Lady Mary and her husband had “three sweet little daughters; Mab, Elsie and Ena, one for each of us sisters, and almost exactly our age,” who joined the Edinburgh family at San Anton Palace in Malta for one winter.

== Marriage and Family ==
Following the death of Mary's rejected suitor Viscount Milton in January 1877, Mary, by then 31 years old, married his younger brother, the politician The Hon. Henry Wentworth-FitzWilliam in July of the same year. The wedding was held at St George's, Hanover Square in London on 12 July; the ceremony was reportedly a significant society event, attended by many members of the British Aristocracy.

The couple had three children:

- Marie "Mab" Albreda Blanche Wentworth-FitzWilliam (1879 - 14 April 1963) (married Major Harold Maxwell Walker in 1904)
  - Marya Constance Walker (25 Oct 1905 - 7 April 1997)
  - Ellenor Mildred Kathleen Walker (1 Sept 1908 - 20 Feb 1991)
  - Rachel Marie Gabrielle Walker (13 May 1913 - 27 Nov 1997)
  - Albreda Mary Walker (8 Oct 1922 - 22 Dec 1976)
- Isabel "Elsie" Elizabeth Mary Wentworth-FitzWilliam (1880 - 1955)
- Irene "Ena" Serga Alice Jane Mary Wentworth-FitzWilliam (1883 - 19 Mar 1972)

In May 1933 Lady Mary's youngest daughter Irene converted to Islam, and changed her name to Ayesha el Mahdia ("Ayesha the Englightened"); she permanently took up residence in Cairo, Egypt in 1931.

== Residences and Later Life ==
The couple took up residence at a large Tudor-style manor house The Lodge, Malton, in Yorkshire, which was owned by Lady Mary's father-in-law Lord FitzWilliam, in mid-1878. The 1881 Census of England that their Household then included ten servants: a Butler, Lady's Maid, one Footman, two Nurses, a Housekeeper, two Housemaids and two Kitchen Maids. This record also includes two buildings marked as ‘Lodge Cottage’, which housed a Gardener, Laundress, Page, Groom, Land Agent, Cook and Housemaid who were likely employed as part of the same household. In 1890 Newspapers reported that Mary's father-in-law Lord FitzWilliam had purchased the Wiganthorpe Hall Estate in Yorkshire for £110,000 as a home for Henry and Mary.

The 1891 Census records Lady Mary and her family as living at Cliff Hall in the Parish of Terrington & Wigganthorpe, Yorkshire. In addition to their three daughters, their household comprised eleven servants; a Governess, Cook, two Lady's Maids, two Footmen, two Housemaids, one Kitchen Maid, one Scullery Maid, and a School Room Maid.

Mary's husband Henry died on 10 July 1920. His estate was valued at £136,525, and his executors included their daughter Marie Walker and Mary's nephew The Hon. George Butler, Earl of Ossory (later 5th Marquess of Ormonde).

The Wiganthorpe Hall Estate was sold in 1921 to Lord Holden, and Lady Mary moved to Mill Hill House in Brandsby, Yorkshire.

In 1927 Mary moved to her final home at Slingsby Hall Yorkshire, which continued to be the home of her second daughter Isabel Wentworth-FitzWilliam until Isabel's death in 1955.

Mary died on 17 January 1929; her personal estate was valued at £8,382. Her funeral was held at Wentworth Woodhouse, the ancestral seat of the Earls FitzWilliam.
