= Peter Wentworth-Fitzwilliam, 8th Earl Fitzwilliam =

British soldier, nobleman, and peer (1910–1948)

The Right Honourable The Earl Fitzwilliam DSO
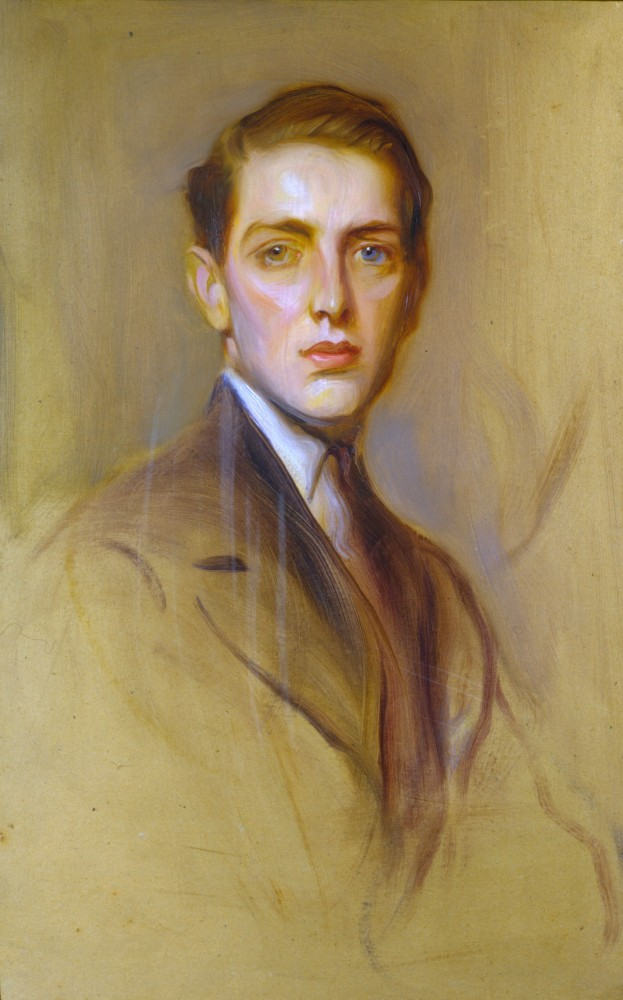
- Portrait by Philip de László, 1933
- Born: William Henry Lawrence Peter Wentworth-Fitzwilliam; 31 December 1910; Wentworth, Yorkshire, England
- Died: 13 May 1948 (aged 37); Saint-Bauzile, Ardèche, France
- Spouse: Olive Dorothea Plunket (m. 1933)
- Children: Lady Juliet Tadgell
- Parent(s): William Wentworth-Fitzwilliam, 7th Earl Fitzwilliam; Lady Maud Dundas

William Henry Lawrence Peter Wentworth-Fitzwilliam, 8th Earl Fitzwilliam, DSO (31 December 1910 – 13 May 1948), styled Viscount Milton before 1943, was a British soldier, nobleman, and peer, with a seat in the House of Lords.

== Early life ==
The fifth child and only son of the William Wentworth-Fitzwilliam, 7th Earl Fitzwilliam and his wife Lady Maud Dundas (a daughter of Lawrence Dundas, 1st Marquess of Zetland), he was born at the family's seat of Wentworth Woodhouse. On 20 July 1929, after serving as a Cadet in the Eton College Contingent (June Division) of the Officer Training Corps, he was commissioned as a second lieutenant into the Royal Scots Greys on the Supplementary Reserve of Officers.

== Second World War ==
During the Second World War, Lord Milton (as he then was) served with distinction in the Commandos and later with the Special Operations Executive, gaining a Distinguished Service Order.

== Family life ==
Milton married, on 19 April 1933, Olive Dorothea "Obby" Plunket (died 1975), a daughter of Benjamin Plunket, Bishop of Tuam, Killala and Achonry, and a granddaughter of William Plunket, 4th Baron Plunket, who was Archbishop of Dublin. They had one daughter, Lady Anne Juliet Dorothea Maud Wentworth-Fitzwilliam, born on 24 January 1935. In 1943, he inherited the Earldom and a great fortune in land, houses, and art, from his father.

In Lord Fitzwilliam's later years, his marriage was in disarray, partly due to Olive's alcoholism, and at the time of his death he was seeking a divorce in order to marry someone else. From 1946, he had been romantically linked with the widowed Kathleen Cavendish, Marchioness of Hartington, sister of the future U.S. President John F. Kennedy. She was killed with him in an air crash on 13 May 1948, although the nature of their relationship was not made clear in the newspaper accounts at the time.

On his death, leaving no son, Fitzwilliam's peerages passed to his second cousin once removed, Eric Spencer Wentworth-Fitzwilliam, but his fortune, then estimated at £45 million, including half of the Wentworth Woodhouse estate, the Coollattin estate in County Wicklow, Ireland, and a large part of the Fitzwilliam art collection, were inherited by his thirteen-year-old daughter, the present Lady Juliet Tadgell.

== In popular culture ==
- Fitzwilliam is portrayed by Thomas Gibson in the television mini-series The Kennedys of Massachusetts (1990) and by Larry Carter in the film Lives and Deaths of the Poets (2011).

== Ancestry ==
Ancestors of Peter Wentworth-Fitzwilliam, 8th Earl Fitzwilliam

8. William Wentworth-Fitzwilliam, 6th Earl Fitzwilliam
4. William Wentworth-Fitzwilliam, Viscount Milton
9. Lady Frances Douglas
2. William Wentworth-Fitzwilliam, 7th Earl Fitzwilliam
10. Lord Charles Beauclerk
5. Laura Beauclerk
11. Laura Stopford
1. Peter Wentworth-Fitzwilliam, 8th Earl Fitzwilliam
12. The Honourable John Dundas
6. Lawrence Dundas, 1st Marquess of Zetland
13. Margaret Talbot
3. Lady Maud Dundas
14. Richard Lumley, 9th Earl of Scarbrough
7. Lady Lilian Lumley
15. Frederica Drummond

Peerage of Ireland
Preceded by William Wentworth-Fitzwilliam	Earl Fitzwilliam; 1943–1948	Succeeded by Eric Wentworth-Fitzwilliam
Peerage of Great Britain
Preceded by William Wentworth-Fitzwilliam	Earl Fitzwilliam; 1943–1948	Succeeded by Eric Wentworth-Fitzwilliam
