= Charles Fleming =

Charles Fleming may refer to:

- Charles Alexander Fleming (1916–1987), New Zealand ornithologist, avian palaeontologist and environmentalist
- Charles Fleming (cricketer) (1887–1918), English cricketer
- Charles E. Fleming (born 1962), judge of the United States District Court for the Northern District of Ohio
- Charles James Fleming (1839–1904), British member of parliament for Doncaster, 1892–1895
- Charlie Fleming (footballer) (1927–1997), Scottish footballer
- Charles Fleming (author), American author
- Charles Fleming (American football) (1877–1944), American football quarterback
- Charles Fleming (rugby union) (1868–1948), Scotland international rugby union player

== See also ==
- Charles Elphinstone Fleeming (1774–1840), Royal Navy officer
