= Charles Wentworth-FitzWilliam (equerry) =

British courtier

Captain The Honourable Sir Charles Wentworth-FitzWilliam GCVO JP DL

Crown Equerry and Secretary to the Master of the Horse
- In office 1910–1924

Master of the Stables and Extra Equerry to HRH the Prince of Wales
- In office 1901–1910

Personal details
- Born: The Hon William Charles Wentworth-FitzWilliam; 31 March 1848
- Died: 17 April 1925 (aged 77)
- Parents: William Wentworth-FitzWilliam (father); Lady Frances Douglas (mother)
- Relatives: Eric Wentworth-Fitzwilliam (son); William Wentworth-Fitzwilliam (brother); Henry Wentworth-FitzWilliam (brother); Mary Wentworth-Fitzwilliam (sister); John Wentworth-FitzWilliam (brother); 19th Earl of Morton (maternal grandfather)
- Education: Eton College
- Alma mater: Magdalene College, Cambridge

Captain Sir William Charles Wentworth-FitzWilliam GCVO JP DL (31 March 1848 – 17 April 1925) was a British courtier.

The fourth son of William Wentworth-FitzWilliam, 6th Earl FitzWilliam and Lady Frances Harriet, eldest daughter of the 19th Earl of Morton, he was educated at Eton and Magdalene College, Cambridge. In 1870 he purchased a Cornetcy in the Royal Horse Guards. He was promoted lieutenant in 1871 and captain in 1878.

From 1880 to 1882 he was ADC to Lord Ripon as Viceroy of India. He retired from the Army in 1883.

He stood as the Conservative candidate for Hallamshire.

He was a deputy lieutenant for the West Riding of Yorkshire and in 1898 he was High Sheriff of Rutland, where he was a justice of the peace. An expert on horses, in 1901 he was appointed Master of the Stables and Extra Equerry to the Prince of Wales. On the latter's accession as King George V in 1910 he was promoted to Crown Equerry and Secretary to the Master of the Horse, a post he held until his retirement in 1924.

He married Constance Anne Brocklehurst on 31 October 1882. They had one son, Eric Spencer Wentworth-Fitzwilliam, 9th Earl Fitzwilliam (4 December 1883 – 3 April 1952).

He was appointed Commander of the Royal Victorian Order (CVO) in 1910, Knight Commander of the Royal Victorian Order (KCVO) in 1911, and Knight Grand Cross of the Royal Victorian Order (GCVO) in the 1921 New Year Honours.

Court offices
Preceded by Sir Henry Ewart	Crown Equerry; 1910–1924	Succeeded by Arthur Erskine
