= Charlie Fleming =

Charlie Fleming may refer to:

- Charlie Fleming (footballer)
- Charlie Fleming (actress)

== See also ==
- Charles Fleming (disambiguation)
