= Thomas Wentworth-Fitzwilliam, 10th Earl Fitzwilliam =

British peer

The Right Honourable The Earl Fitzwilliam JP
- The 10th Earl Fitzwilliam
- Born: William Thomas George Wentworth-Fitzwilliam; 28 May 1904
- Died: 21 September 1979 (aged 75); Wentworth Woodhouse, South Yorkshire, England
- Spouse(s): Joyce, Viscountess FitzAlan of Derwent (m. 1956)
- Parent(s): George Wentworth-Fitzwilliam; Evelyn Lyster

William Thomas George Wentworth-Fitzwilliam, 10th Earl Fitzwilliam JP (28 May 1904 – 21 September 1979), known as Tom, of Wentworth Woodhouse, near Rotherham, Yorkshire (the largest private residence in England), and of Milton Hall, Peterborough (the largest house in Cambridgeshire), was a British peer. He was the patron of 33 livings. When he died without issue the earldom became extinct.

== Origins ==
He was the son and heir of George Charles Wentworth-Fitzwilliam, son of Hon. George Wentworth-Fitzwilliam, MP, 3rd son of the 5th Earl Fitzwilliam (1786–1857). His mother was Evelyn Lyster, daughter of Charles Stephen Lyster.

== Career ==
He was educated at Eton College in houses run by Reginald Saumarez de Havilland and Clement James Mellish Adie. In 1923 he went up to Magdalene College, Cambridge. He was appointed Justice of the Peace (JP) for the Liberty of Peterborough.

== Marriage ==
On 3 April 1956, he married Joyce Elizabeth Mary Langdale (25 April 1898 – 7 June 1995) of Houghton Hall, Yorkshire. She had previously been married to the 2nd Viscount FitzAlan of Derwent (1883–1962), from whom she was divorced in 1955. She died in 1995 at her home in Peterborough.

== Death ==
He died in 1979 at Wentworth Woodhouse. He left no issue from his marriage. He left £11,776,401 gross (£11,584,880 net), thus paying virtually no death duties.

== Ancestry ==
Ancestors of Thomas Wentworth-Fitzwilliam, 10th Earl Fitzwilliam

16. William Fitzwilliam, 4th Earl Fitzwilliam
8. Charles Wentworth-Fitzwilliam, 5th Earl Fitzwilliam
17. Lady Charlotte Ponsonby
4. Hon. George Wentworth-Fitzwilliam
18. Thomas Dundas, 1st Baron Dundas
9. Hon. Mary Dundas
19. Lady Charlotte FitzWilliam
2. George Wentworth-Fitzwilliam
20. Thomas Anson, 1st Viscount Anson
10. Hon. George Anson
21. Lady Anne Coke
5. Alice Louisa Anson
22. Cecil Weld-Forester, 1st Baron Forester
11. Hon. Isabella Weld-Forester
23. Lady Katherine Manners
1. Thomas Wentworth-Fitzwilliam, 10th Earl Fitzwilliam
6. Charles Stephen Lyster
3. Evelyn Lyster

Peerage of Ireland
| Preceded by Eric Wentworth-Fitzwilliam | Earl Fitzwilliam; 1952–1979 | Extinct |
Peerage of Great Britain
| Preceded by Eric Wentworth-Fitzwilliam | Earl Fitzwilliam; 1952–1979 | Extinct |
