= William Richard O'Byrne =

Irish biographer and politician (1823–1896)

William Richard O'Byrne (1823 – 7 July 1896) was an Irish biographer and politician, author of the A Naval Biographical Dictionary (1849).

== Biography ==
He was elder son of Robert O'Byrne and his wife Martha Trougher, daughter of Joseph Clark. He was a young man when he conceived of publishing a record of the service of every living Royal Navy officer of the executive branch. The work proved an unrewarding struggle. Sir Francis Thornhill Baring appointed him librarian at the Admiralty; but his successor, Algernon Percy, 4th Duke of Northumberland, did not confirm the position.

Recognition for O'Byrne's work came from the Royal United Service Institution, and in 1857, he was specially elected a member of the Athenæum Club. On the death of his cousin Georgiana O'Byrne, he succeeded to the Cabinteely estate, County Wicklow. In 1872, he was High Sheriff of Wicklow, and was MP for County Wicklow from 1874 to 1880. But the property to which he had succeeded was heavily mortgaged; the mortgagees foreclosed, and O'Byrne was left with little. In 1884, he was awarded £100 from the royal bounty. The Admiralty refused him a post. During his last years O'Byrne's health broke down, and he was mainly dependent on his daughter.

In the summer of 1896 he was granted £125 from the royal bounty. He died in South Kensington on 7 July 1896. His wife, by whom he had one daughter, predeceased him.

== Works ==
As a young man, O'Byrne conceived the idea of a Biographica Navalis (Naval Biographical Dictionary). It took six years for him to publish the first parts in 1845 and the full set of 1,400 pages was published by 1849. The Admiralty records were disorganised; O'Byrne corresponded with the subjects of his memoirs, supplementing their statements with the official records. He did not achieve much financial success from his work, though the Royal United Service Institute rewarded him with a piece of plate and a gift of £400. While he aimed for meticulous accuracy, the biographical entries were often not particularly objectively written, as he invited serving officers to submit their own autobiographical conclusions. The accounts of their lives thus often make them appear as paragons of naval virtues.

In 1859, he began a second edition of the dictionary, containing memoirs of officers of the civil branches of the service. It was never finished and he reached no further than the letter G.

Parliament of the United Kingdom
Preceded by Henry Wentworth-FitzWilliam; William Wentworth FitzWilliam Dick	Member of Parliament for County Wicklow; 1874 – 1880; With: William Wentworth FitzWilliam Dick	Succeeded by James Carlile McCoan; William Joseph Corbet
