= Eric Spencer Wentworth-Fitzwilliam, 9th Earl Fitzwilliam =

British noble and politician (1883–1952)

The Right Honourable The Earl Fitzwilliam
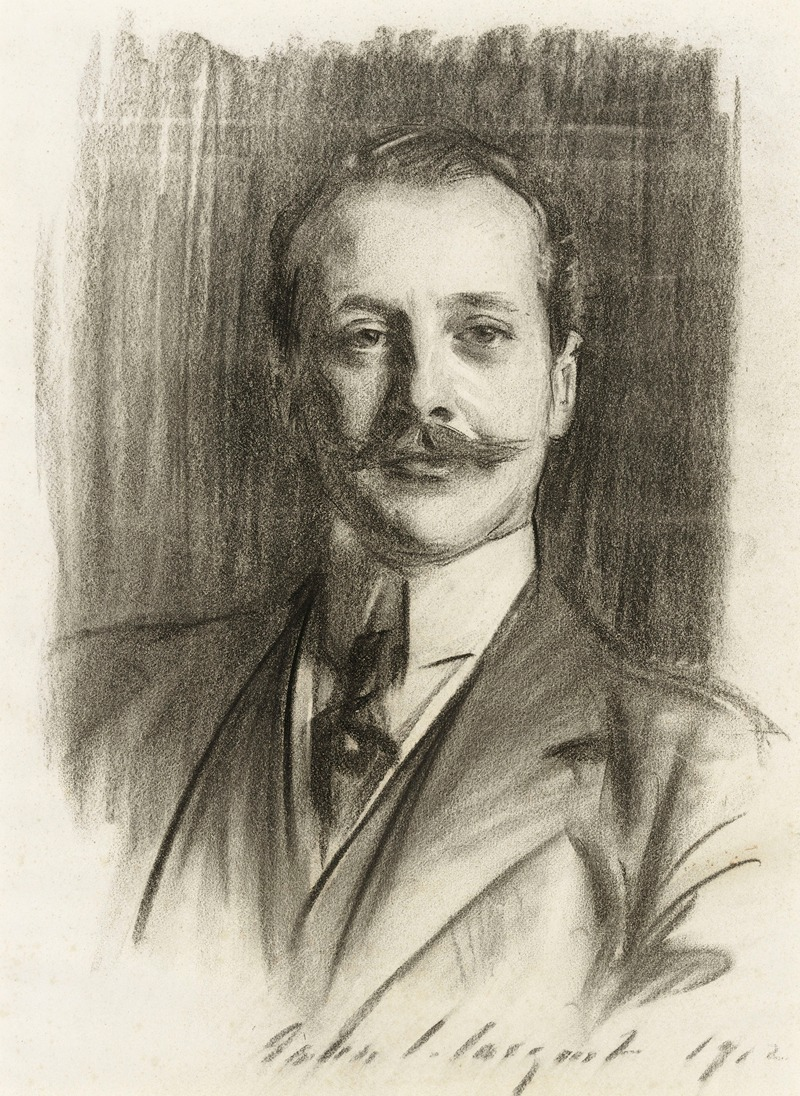
- Portrait, 1912
- Born: 4 December 1883
- Died: 3 April 1952 (aged 68)
- Resting place: Holy Trinity Church, Wentworth
- Spouse: Jessica Gertrude Rowlands (m. 1912; div. 1917)
- Parents: Charles Wentworth-Fitzwilliam (father); Constance Anne Brocklehurst (mother)
- Relatives: William Wentworth-Fitzwilliam (paternal grandfather); Peter Wentworth-Fitzwilliam (cousin); Thomas Wentworth-Fitzwilliam (2nd cousin)
- Military career
- Allegiance: United Kingdom
- Branch: British Army
- Service years: 1909–1918
- Rank: Lieutenant
- Units: Royal Army Service Corps; Leicestershire Yeomanry
- Conflicts: World War I

Eric Spencer Wentworth-Fitzwilliam, 9th Earl Fitzwilliam (4 December 1883 – 3 April 1952) was a British nobleman and politician.

== Life ==
Eric Wentworth-Fitzwilliam was the son of Captain the Hon. Sir William Charles Wentworth-Fitzwilliam, fourth son of William Wentworth-Fitzwilliam, 6th Earl Fitzwilliam, and Constance Anne Brocklehurst.

Fitzwilliam was commissioned as a Second Lieutenant into the Royal Army Service Corps in 1909. In 1912, he married Jessica Gertrude Rowlands. On the outbreak of war in 1914, he gained a temporary commission in the Leicestershire Yeomanry as a lieutenant. His marriage was dissolved in 1917, with no children having been born.

In May 1948, Fitzwilliam's cousin Peter Wentworth-Fitzwilliam, 8th Earl Fitzwilliam, died without a son, and he inherited his peerages. Several of the estates which had descended with them went to the 8th Earl's thirteen-year-old daughter, Lady Juliet, but Fitzwilliam inherited half of the entailed Wentworth Woodhouse estate.

On Fitzwilliam's death in 1952 this line of the family came to an end, and the peerages were inherited by a second cousin, Thomas Wentworth-Fitzwilliam, 10th Earl Fitzwilliam. The 9th Earl Fitzwilliam was buried at Holy Trinity Church, Wentworth.

Peerage of Ireland
Preceded by Peter Wentworth-Fitzwilliam	Earl Fitzwilliam; 1948–1952	Succeeded by Thomas Wentworth-Fitzwilliam
Peerage of Great Britain
Preceded by Peter Wentworth-Fitzwilliam	Earl Fitzwilliam; 1948–1952	Succeeded by Thomas Wentworth-Fitzwilliam
