= Levant Herald =

Bilingual language newspaper in the Ottoman Empire (1856–1914)

- Type: Daily newspaper
- Founder: James Carlile McCoan
- Editor: James Carlile McCoan; Edgar Whitaker
- Founded: 1856
- Ceased publication: 1914
- Language: English; French
- Headquarters: Constantinople
- Country: Ottoman Empire
- Sister newspapers: Constantinople Messenger
- OCLC number: 556630285

Levant Herald was a bilingual newspaper which existed in the period 1856–1914 in Constantinople. It was founded by British subjects of the Ottoman Empire. The paper had English and French language editions. Published more than fifty years it was one of the long-lived publications in the Empire. However, it was banned from time to time during its run.

== History and profile ==
Levant Herald was started in 1856 under the title Galata Courier. Its founder was James Carlile McCoan who also edited it. The paper was temporarily closed down in the period between 29 May and 24 July 1878. The weekly edition of the paper was Constantinople Messenger which was first published on 24 July 1878. Constantinople Messenger was an eight-page publication which was published on Wednesdays. From 1890 to its closure in 1914 the paper was published under the title The Levant Herald and Eastern Express.

Edgar Whitaker was one of the editors of the paper which covered all significant events of the period, including Ottoman-Russian relations, the Bulgarian issue, tensions in the Balkans and the Russo-Ottoman War. Najib Al Hajj was the Cairo correspondent of the paper. It was one of the supporters of Ottoman Sultan Murad V and received financial aid from Khedive Ismail of Egypt in the 1870s. The paper also played a role in the formation of the opposition against Abdulhamit, another Ottoman ruler.

Mark Twain's The Innocents Abroad includes references to Levant Herald in Chapter 34. In the book it is stated that due to its frequent reports about the rebels in Crete the paper was often censored by the Ottoman authorities in the late 1860s. Levant Herald sold 5,200 copies in 1907. It ceased publication in 1914.
