= Coollattin House =

Country House in County Wicklow, Ireland

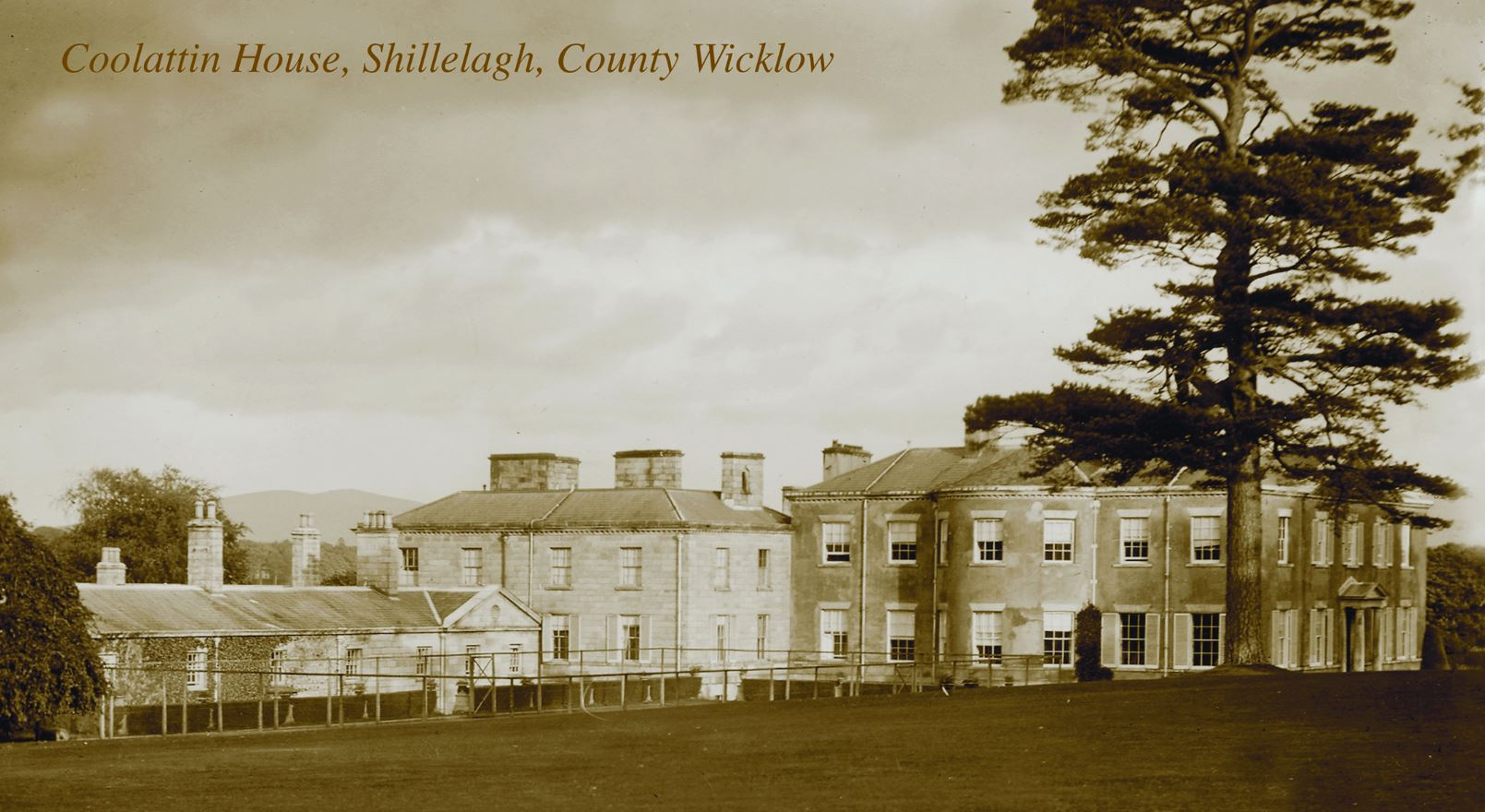
- Alternative names: Malton Park

General information
- Status: Private dwelling house
- Type: House
- Architectural style: Georgian
- Location: Shillelagh, County Wicklow, Ireland
- Coordinates: 52.7550579°N 6.5005212°W
- Construction started: 1776
- Construction stopped: 1798
- Completed: 1801–04
- Renovated: 1875
- Owner: The Coollattin House Limited Partnership

Height
- Height: 30 m (98 ft)

Technical details
- Size: 65,000 sq ft (6,000 m^{2})
- Floor count: 4

Design and construction
- Architect: John Carr
- Developer: William Fitzwilliam, 4th Earl Fitzwilliam
- Main contractor: Thomas Hobson of Yorkshire (superintendent)
- Known for: The largest house in Ireland by floor area

Renovating team
- Architect: William Dickie (1875–84)

Other information
- Number of rooms: c. 117

Coolattin House or Coolattin Park is a Georgian house and estate located in Shillelagh, County Wicklow, Ireland. It is one of the largest private houses in Ireland, covering approximately 65,000 square feet (6,000 m^{2}) and having 117 rooms over four floors. Constructed in its present form from 1776–1804 by William Fitzwilliam, the 4th Earl Fitzwilliam, it has a rich history connected to the prominent Fitzwilliam family, who were substantial landowners in both Ireland and England.

== History ==
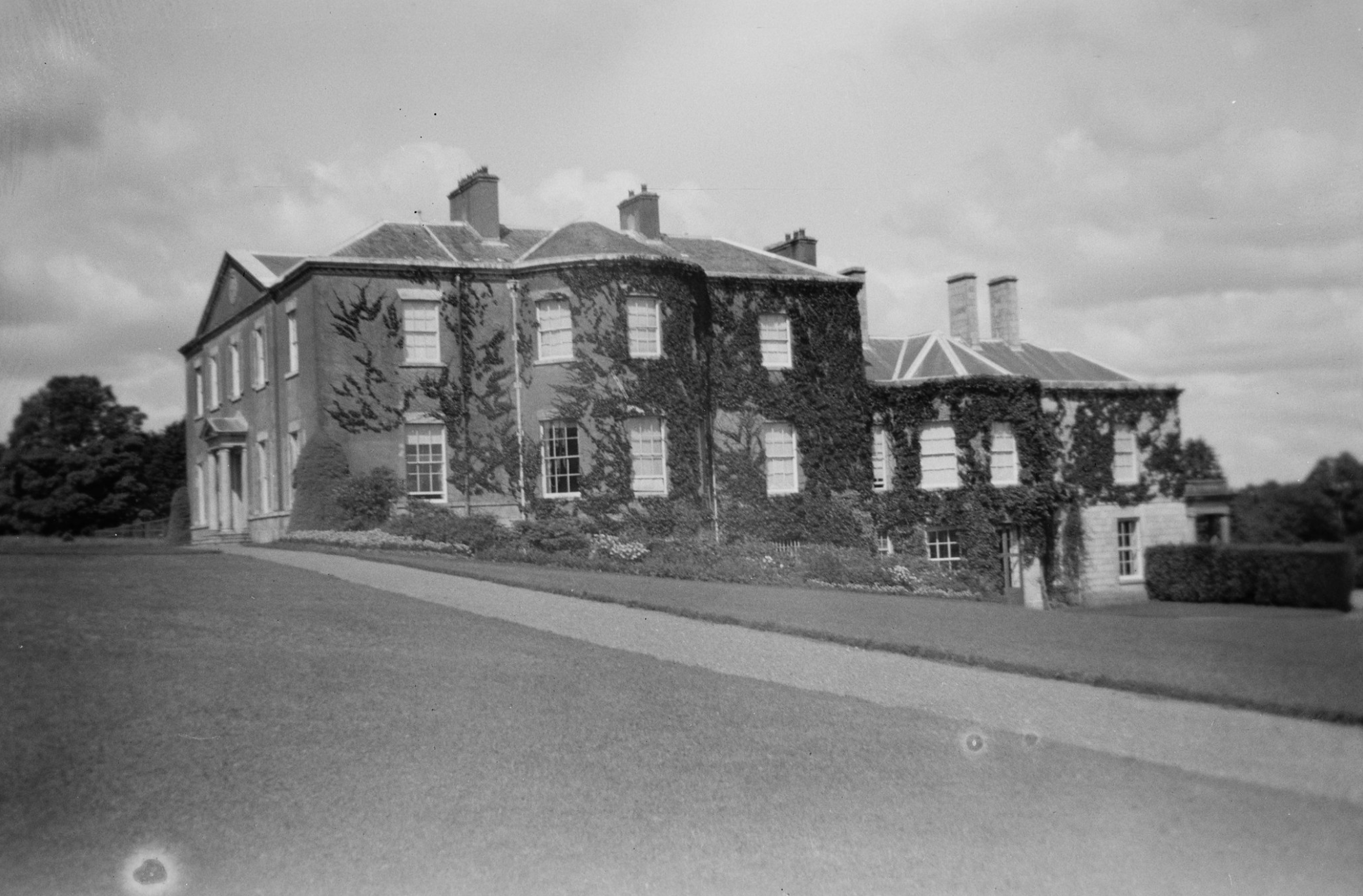
Coollattin House

=== Fitzwilliam family ===
In 1578 the land that would later become Coolattin was granted to Sir Henry Harrington, an English adventurer. In 1638 it was purchased by Thomas Wentworth, the King's representative in Ireland as Lord Deputy, who was notoriously known as Black Tom. By 1782 Coolattin Estate was owned by Charles Wentworth-Watson, the 2nd Marquess of Rockingham, who served twice as British Prime Minister. When he died, the Fitzwilliam family's presence in Ireland began as the second marquess's extensive estates were inherited by his nephew, the fourth earl. The Fitzwilliams controlled around 90,000 acres (36,000 ha) of land in Ireland, making them one of the country's largest landowners. It was the largest single landholding in Wicklow and home to 20,000 tenants (in the 1830s).

In January 1794, the fourth Earl Fitzwilliam was appointed Lord Lieutenant of Ireland. His tenure was brief, as he championed Catholic Emancipation and attempted to curb the power of the Protestant Ascendancy, which led to his recall by the British government in March 1795. Despite his short time in office, Fitzwilliam maintained a strong interest in Ireland and its affairs, leading to his decision to build a significant residence on his Wicklow estate at Coolattin.

There were already some structures on the site, possibly a hunting lodge, as records from 1776 indicate suggestions for improvement. However, construction on the new house did not commence until 1796. The Yorkshire architect John Carr, who had previously worked for the Fitzwilliams in England, was commissioned to design the house. Carr's architectural style evolved over time, blending Palladian influences with Adamesque classicism. His work on Coolattin was characterised by conservative yet elegant design principles, featuring a symmetrical façade, a three-bay breakfront with a substantial pediment displaying the Fitzwilliam coat of arms, and free-standing Tuscan columns framing the entrance.

However, before the house was fully completed, it was damaged during the Irish Rebellion of 1798 and had to be rebuilt in the early 19th century. Subsequent generations of the Fitzwilliam family continued to expand and modify the house, adapting it to evolving architectural tastes and functional needs.

=== Expansions and alterations ===
Significant modifications occurred in the 19th century, particularly under the sixth Earl Fitzwilliam in the 1870s. To modernise and expand the estate, he engaged William Dickie, a Yorkshire-based architect and the clerk of works at Wentworth Woodhouse, the Fitzwilliam family's grand English estate. Dickie oversaw the construction of a new entrance front, a south range, a servants' wing, and stables, significantly increasing the size of Coolattin House. Unlike Carr's original lined render, Dickie's extensions were faced with local granite, making it possible to distinguish between the earlier and later additions.

One of the most striking additions by Dickie was the new entrance at what had previously been the rear of the house. The sloping ground at the back allowed for an impressive architectural statement, with a grand portico supported by paired Doric columns and a flight of granite steps leading up to the entrance. Inside, this led to a spacious hall with a coved ceiling and a limestone-flagged floor. Adjacent to this, a smaller inner hall contained a large chimneypiece, while a grand staircase—designed in a baroque style reminiscent of Piedmontese and Sicilian palaces—provided access to the upper floors. This staircase, featuring arched windows and a balustraded gallery, remains one of the most architecturally significant elements of Coolattin House.

Interior alterations also included the relocation of the main entrance from the south to the north and the removal of the wall between the hall and the drawing room, creating a large reception space. The library, redesigned in the 1880s, was adorned with rare Chinese wallpaper, an opulent decorative choice that extended to another room at the rear of the house. The dining room, originally intended to have bowed walls at both ends, was only partially completed according to Carr's plans, with just the window side incorporating this feature.

=== Later years and restoration efforts ===
The Fitzwilliam family remained in possession of Coolattin House well into the 20th century. In 1943 the eighth Earl Fitzwilliam inherited the estate, along with extensive holdings in England. In 1948 tragedy struck when he was killed in a plane crash alongside the widowed Kathleen Cavendish, Marchioness of Hartington, sister of the future U.S. President John F. Kennedy, with whom he was romantically involved. Following his death, his widow, Olive Plunket, continued to live at Coolattin until her death in 1975. The estate was then sold by their only child, Lady Anne Juliet Dorothea Maud Wentworth-Fitzwilliam, who later became the mother-in-law of British Conservative politician Sir Jacob Rees-Mogg.

Following its sale, Coolattin House went through a turbulent period, changing hands multiple times. Much of its original surrounding land and contents were sold off, leading to the gradual decline of the estate. In 1983 an American couple, the Wardrops, acquired Coolattin and undertook significant restoration efforts to preserve the structure. However, after the death of Mr. Wardrop, his widow sold the estate in 1995 to a local golf club, which sought to expand its course from nine to eighteen holes. Despite some maintenance work, the house remained largely unoccupied for the next 25 years and fell into a state of disrepair.

In recent years, renewed efforts to save Coolattin House have emerged. A group of concerned individuals acquired the estate, 21 acres (8.5 ha) remain, undertaking the significant challenge of restoring what remains Ireland's largest private house. Their work aims to bring Coolattin back from the brink of ruin and preserve its historical and architectural significance for future generations.

In 2023 the Irish Government stated that the house and grounds "is intrinsically of significant architectural, aesthetic and historical interest".

== Literature ==
- Lee, Kevin (2020). Light in the Forest: The Story of Coollattin, 1633–2019. Wilfrid Laurier University Press. ISBN 9781771124607.
- Lee, Kevin (2022). Coollattin The History of Ireland's mysterious estate & its pivotal role in the birth of Canada. Croneyhorn Upper, Carnew, County Wicklow: Coollattin Canadian Connection. ISBN 9781399903837.
