= Sir Ralph Howard, 1st Baronet =

Irish Whig politician and militia officer

Sir Ralph Howard

Member of Parliament for County Wicklow
- In office 27 April 1848 – 17 July 1852 Serving with William Wentworth-Fitzwilliam
- Preceded by: William Acton; William Wentworth-Fitzwilliam
- Succeeded by: William Wentworth FitzWilliam Dick; William Wentworth-Fitzwilliam
- In office 22 July 1829 – 7 August 1847 Serving with James Grattan (1829–1841); William Acton (1841–1847)
- Preceded by: Granville Proby; James Grattan
- Succeeded by: William Acton; William Wentworth-Fitzwilliam

Personal details
- Born: 1801
- Died: 15 August 1873 (aged 71–72)
- Party: Whig

Sir Ralph Howard, 1st Baronet (1801 – 15 August 1873) was an Irish Whig politician and militia officer.

== Family ==
Howard was the first son of Hugh Howard and Catherine née Bligh, daughter of Robert Bligh. He was also the grandson of Ralph Howard, 1st Viscount Wicklow, and brother-in-law of Granville Proby, 3rd Earl of Carysfort. Educated at Eton College from 1817, and Brasenose College, Oxford, from 1819, he married, in 1817, Charlotte Anne Crauford, daughter of Daniel Craufurd, and widow of James John Fraser.

== Political career ==
At the 1826 general election, Howard proposed his brother-in-law, Granville Proby, for election at County Wicklow and, three years later at a by-election, the support was repaid in kind when Proby made way for Howard to take the seat as a Whig. With the approval and "no objection whatever" of Charles Wentworth-Fitzwilliam, 5th Earl Fitzwilliam, he was returned unopposed. In Parliament, he voted for the enfranchisement of Leeds, Birmingham, and Manchester and divided with the Whigs against pensions for Robert Dundas, 2nd Viscount Melville and W. L. Bathurst, for the abolition of the Irish viceroyalty, and a reduction of the grant to South America missions.

At the 1830 general election, promising to support ministers when "their measures entitled them", he was returned unopposed and was listed by ministers as "bad doubtfuls". In the House of Commons, he voted against the civil list, and then sponsored a "very short and tolerably mild" against a repeal of the Acts of Union 1800, later pushing for the reintroduction of the acts to suppress seditious meetings. He noted that popular meetings could "not be held without the permission of the local authorities". He presented petitions for the abolition of slavery and voted for reform, going into the 1831 general election as a reformer, where he was returned unopposed.

In the latter year, he joined Brooks's, sponsored by Lords Charlemont and Gosford, and continued to vote for the reform bill, including granting the franchise to all persons rated to the poor at £10 and giving two members of parliament to Stoke-upon-Trent. At some time a member of the Athenaeum Club, he then held the Wicklow seat until 1847 when he unsuccessfully sought election at Evesham. He was returned for Wicklow again at a by-election in 1848—caused by the resignation of William Acton—and held the seat until 1852 when he did not seek re-election.

On 1 October 1834 he was appointed Colonel of the disembodied Wicklow Militia, formerly commanded by his father. When the regiment was revived in 1852 he continued as its Honorary Colonel until he resigned on 9 December 1871.

== Baronetcy ==
Howard baronets of Bushey Park
- Escutcheon of the Howard baronets of Bushey Park
- Creation date: 1838
- Status: extinct
- Extinction date: 1873
- Seats: Bushy Park, Co. Wicklow
- Motto: Inservi Deo et laetare, serve God and be cheerful

He was elevated to the Baronetcy of Bushey Park in 1838; it became extinct upon his death in 1873.

Parliament of the United Kingdom
Preceded by Granville Proby; James Grattan	Member of Parliament for County Wicklow; 1829–1847; With: James Grattan (1829–1841); William Acton (1841–1847)	Succeeded by William Acton; William Wentworth-Fitzwilliam
Preceded by William Acton; William Wentworth-Fitzwilliam	Member of Parliament for County Wicklow; 1848–1852; With: William Wentworth-Fitzwilliam	Succeeded by William Wentworth FitzWilliam Dick; William Wentworth-Fitzwilliam
Baronetage of the United Kingdom
New creation	Baronet (of Bushey Park); 1838–1873	Extinct
Preceded by Macpherson-Grant baronets	Howard baronets of Bushey Park; 26 July 1838	Succeeded by Micklethwait baronets
