= Henry Wentworth-FitzWilliam =

British politician

Member of Parliament for Doncaster
- In office 1888–1892

Member of Parliament for West Riding of Yorkshire South
- In office 1880–1885 Serving with William Henry Leatham

Member of Parliament for County Wicklow
- In office 1868–1874 Serving with William Wentworth FitzWilliam Hume

Personal details
- Born: 26 December 1840
- Died: 10 July 1920 (aged 79)
- Party: Liberal Unionist
- Spouse: Lady Mary Butler (m. 1877)
- Parent: William Wentworth-FitzWilliam (father)
- Relatives: William Wentworth-FitzWilliam (brother); Charles Wentworth-FitzWilliam (brother); John Wentworth-FitzWilliam (brother); George Douglas (grandfather)

The Hon. William Henry Wentworth-FitzWilliam (26 December 1840 – 10 July 1920), was a British Liberal, and later Liberal Unionist politician.

== Background ==
Wentworth-FitzWilliam was the second son of William Wentworth-FitzWilliam, 6th Earl FitzWilliam, and Lady Frances Harriet, daughter of George Douglas, 17th Earl of Morton. Viscount Milton, the Hon. Charles Wentworth-FitzWilliam and the Hon. John Wentworth-FitzWilliam were his brothers

== Political career ==
Wentworth-FitzWilliam entered Parliament for County Wicklow in 1868, a seat he held until 1874. He later represented the West Riding of Yorkshire South between 1880 and 1885 and Doncaster between 1888 and 1892. Initially a Liberal, he disagreed with William Ewart Gladstone over Irish Home Rule and sat as a Liberal Unionist between 1888 and 1892.

== Family ==
Fitzwilliam married Lady Mary Butler, daughter of the late John Butler, 2nd Marquess of Ormonde and sister of the-then Marquess of Ormonde at St George's, Hanover Square in London on 12 July; the ceremony was reportedly a significant society event, attended by many members of the British Aristocracy.

The couple had three children:

- Marie "Mab" Albreda Blanche Wentworth-FitzWilliam (1879 - 14 April 1963) (married Major Harold Maxwell Walker in 1904)
  - Marya Constance Walker (25 Oct 1905 - 7 April 1997)
  - Ellenor Mildred Kathleen Walker (1 Sept 1908 - 20 Feb 1991)
  - Rachel Marie Gabrielle Walker (13 May 1913 - 27 Nov 1997)
  - Albreda Mary Walker (8 Oct 1922 - 22 Dec 1976)
- Isabel "Elsie" Elizabeth Mary Wentworth-FitzWilliam (1880 - 1955)
- Irene "Ena" Serga Alice Jane Mary Wentworth-FitzWilliam (1883 - 19 Mar 1972)

In May 1933 his youngest daughter Irene converted to Islam, and changed her name to Ayesha el Mahdia ("Ayesha the Englightened"); she permanently took up residence in Cairo, Egypt in 1931.

== Residences and Later Life ==
The couple took up residence at a large Tudor-style manor house The Lodge, Malton, in Yorkshire, which was owned by Henry's father Lord FitzWilliam, in mid-1878. The 1881 Census of England that their household included ten servants: a Butler, Lady's Maid, one Footman, two Nurses, a Housekeeper, two Housemaids and two Kitchen Maids. This record also includes two buildings marked as ‘Lodge Cottage’, which housed a Gardener, Laundress, Page, Groom, Land Agent, Cook and Housemaid who were likely employed as part of the same household. In 1890 Newspapers reported that Earl FitzWilliam had purchased the Wiganthorpe Hall Estate in Yorkshire for £110,000 as a home for Henry and Mary.

The 1891 Census records the family as living at Cliff Hall in the Parish of Terrington & Wigganthorpe, Yorkshire. In addition to their three daughters, their household comprised eleven servants; a Governess, Cook, two Lady's Maids, two Footmen, two Housemaids, one Kitchen Maid, one Scullery Maid, and a School Room Maid.

Henry Fitzwilliam died on 10 July 1920. His estate was valued at £136,525, and his executors included his daughter Marie Walker and his wife's nephew The Hon. George Butler, Earl of Ossory (later 5th Marquess of Ormonde).

The Wiganthorpe Hall Estate was sold in 1921 to Lord Holden, with the widowed Lady Mary reported to be moving to Mill Hill House, Brandsby, Yorkshire. Lady Mary survived her husband by nine years before her death in 1929.

Parliament of the United Kingdom
Preceded by William Wentworth FitzWilliam Hume; Lord Proby	Member of Parliament for County Wicklow; 1868–1874; With: William Wentworth FitzWilliam Hume	Succeeded by William Wentworth FitzWilliam Hume; William Richard O'Byrne
Preceded by Walter Spencer-Stanhope; Lewis Randle Starkey	Member of Parliament for West Riding of Yorkshire South; 1880–1885; With: William Henry Leatham	Constituency abolished
Preceded by Walter Shirley Shirley	Member of Parliament for Doncaster; 1888–1892	Succeeded by Charles James Fleming
