= County Wicklow (UK Parliament constituency) =

UK parliamentary constituency in Ireland, 1801–1885

- Former county constituency for the House of Commons
- County: County Wicklow

1801–1885
- Created from: County Wicklow (IHC)
- Replaced by: East Wicklow; West Wicklow

County Wicklow was a parliamentary constituency in Ireland, represented in the Parliament of the United Kingdom. From 1801 to 1885 it returned two Members of Parliament (MPs) to the House of Commons of the United Kingdom of Great Britain and Ireland.

At the 1885 general election, under the Redistribution of Seats Act 1885, County Wicklow was divided into two parliamentary divisions: East Wicklow and West Wicklow.

== Boundaries ==
This constituency comprised the whole of County Wicklow.

== Members of Parliament ==
Year	1st Member	1st Party	2nd Member	2nd Party
1801	William Hoare Hume		vacant until the by-election held in Jan 1801	
Jan 1801	William Hoare Hume		George Ponsonby	Whig
1806	William Hoare Hume		William Tighe	
Feb 1816	Hon. Granville Proby	Whig	William Tighe	
Apr 1816	Hon. Granville Proby	Whig	George Ponsonby	Whig
Aug 1817	Hon. Granville Proby	Whig	William Parnell-Hayes	
1821	Hon. Granville Proby	Whig	James Grattan	Whig
Jul 1829	Sir Ralph Howard, Bt	Whig	James Grattan	Whig
1841	Sir Ralph Howard, Bt	Whig	William Acton	Conservative
1847	Viscount Milton	Whig	William Acton	Conservative
Apr 1848	Viscount Milton	Whig	Sir Ralph Howard, Bt	Whig
1852	Viscount Milton	Whig	William Wentworth FitzWilliam Dick	Conservative
Feb 1858	Lord Proby	Whig	William Wentworth FitzWilliam Dick	Conservative
1859	Lord Proby	Liberal	William Wentworth FitzWilliam Dick	Conservative
Nov 1868	Hon. Henry Wentworth-FitzWilliam	Liberal	William Wentworth FitzWilliam Dick	Conservative
1874	William Richard O'Byrne	Home Rule League	William Wentworth FitzWilliam Dick	Conservative
1880	William Joseph Corbet	Parnellite Home Rule League	James Carlile McCoan	Parnellite Home Rule League
1881	William Joseph Corbet	Parnellite Home Rule League	James Carlile McCoan	Independent
1885	Constituency divided: see East Wicklow and West Wicklow			

== Elections ==
=== Elections in the 1830s ===
General election 1830: Wicklow
Party	Candidate	Votes	%
Whig	James Grattan	Unopposed	
Whig	Ralph Howard	Unopposed	
Registered electors		785	
Whig hold			
Whig hold			

General election 1831: Wicklow
Party	Candidate	Votes	%
Whig	James Grattan	Unopposed	
Whig	Ralph Howard	Unopposed	
Registered electors		785	
Whig hold			
Whig hold			

General election 1832: Wicklow
Party	Candidate	Votes	%
Whig	James Grattan	717	32.3
Whig	Ralph Howard	710	32.0
Tory	William Acton	661	29.8
Tory	John Humphreys	132	5.9
Majority		49	2.2
Turnout		1,384	88.4
Registered electors		1,566	
Whig hold			
Whig hold			

General election 1835: Wicklow
Party	Candidate	Votes	%
Whig	James Grattan	Unopposed	
Whig	Ralph Howard	Unopposed	
Registered electors		1,679	
Whig hold			
Whig hold			

General election 1837: Wicklow
Party	Candidate	Votes	%
Whig	James Grattan	697	34.5
Whig	Ralph Howard	696	34.4
Conservative	William Acton	623	30.8
Conservative	John Humphreys	6	0.3
Majority		73	3.6
Turnout		1,323	69.6
Registered electors		1,900	
Whig hold			
Whig hold			

=== Elections in the 1840s ===
General election 1841: Wicklow
Party	Candidate	Votes	%	±%
Conservative	William Acton	663	36.2	+5.1
Whig	Ralph Howard	603	33.0	−1.4
Whig	James Grattan	563	30.8	−3.7
Majority		100	5.4	N/A
Turnout		1,235	80.7	+11.1
Registered electors		1,530		
Conservative gain from Whig		Swing	+5.1	
Whig hold		Swing	−2.0	

General election 1847: Wicklow
Party	Candidate	Votes	%	±%
Whig	William Wentworth-FitzWilliam	Unopposed		
Conservative	William Acton	Unopposed		
Registered electors		1,836		
Whig hold				
Conservative hold				

Acton resigned by accepting the office of Steward of the Chiltern Hundreds, causing a by-election.

By-election, 27 April 1848: Wicklow
Party	Candidate	Votes	%	±%
Whig	Ralph Howard	368	50.9	N/A
Conservative	Charles Monck	355	49.1	N/A
Majority		13	1.8	N/A
Turnout		723	52.2 (est)	N/A
Registered electors		1,386 (1847 figure)		
Whig gain from Conservative		Swing	N/A	

=== Elections in the 1850s ===
General election 1852: Wicklow
Party	Candidate	Votes	%	±%
Whig	William Wentworth-FitzWilliam	Unopposed		
Conservative	William Wentworth FitzWilliam Hume	Unopposed		
Registered electors		3,330		
Whig hold				
Conservative hold				

General election 1857: Wicklow
Party	Candidate	Votes	%	±%
Whig	William Wentworth-FitzWilliam	1,970	42.7	N/A
Conservative	William Wentworth FitzWilliam Hume	1,610	34.9	N/A
Whig	Richard Monck	1,030	22.3	N/A
Turnout		2,305 (est)	68.6 (est)	N/A
Registered electors		3,358		
Majority		360	7.8	N/A
Whig hold		Swing	N/A	
Majority		580	12.6	N/A
Conservative hold		Swing	N/A	

Wentworth-FitzWilliam succeeded to the peerage, becoming 6th Earl FitzWilliam, causing a by-election.

By-election, 25 February 1858: Wicklow
Party	Candidate	Votes	%	±%
Whig	Granville Proby	Unopposed		
Whig hold				

General election 1859: Wicklow
Party	Candidate	Votes	%	±%
Liberal	Granville Proby	Unopposed		
Conservative	William Wentworth FitzWilliam Hume	Unopposed		
Registered electors		3,368		
Liberal hold				
Conservative hold				

Proby was appointed Comptroller of the Household, requiring a by-election.

By-election, 18 July 1859: Wicklow
Party	Candidate	Votes	%	±%
Liberal	Granville Proby	Unopposed		
Registered electors		3,368		
Liberal hold				

=== Elections in the 1860s ===
General election 1865: Wicklow
Party	Candidate	Votes	%	±%
Liberal	Granville Proby	Unopposed		
Conservative	William Wentworth FitzWilliam Dick	Unopposed		
Registered electors		3,537		
Liberal hold				
Conservative hold				

General election 1868: Wicklow
Party	Candidate	Votes	%	±%
Liberal	Henry Wentworth-FitzWilliam	Unopposed		
Conservative	William Wentworth FitzWilliam Dick	Unopposed		
Registered electors		3,613		
Liberal hold				
Conservative hold				

=== Elections in the 1870s ===
General election 1874: Wicklow
Party	Candidate	Votes	%	±%
Home Rule	William Richard O'Byrne	1,511	36.6	New
Conservative	William Wentworth FitzWilliam Dick	1,141	27.6	N/A
Liberal	Henry Wentworth-FitzWilliam	927	22.4	N/A
Home Rule	John Howard Parnell	553	13.4	New
Turnout		2,066 (est)	57.7 (est)	N/A
Registered electors		3,579		
Majority		584	14.2	N/A
Home Rule gain from Liberal		Swing	N/A	
Majority		214	5.2	N/A
Conservative hold		Swing	N/A	

=== Elections in the 1880s ===
General election 1880: Wicklow
Party	Candidate	Votes	%	±%
Parnellite Home Rule League	William Joseph Corbet	1,433	30.3	−6.3
Parnellite Home Rule League	James Carlile McCoan	1,240	26.3	+12.9
Conservative	William Wentworth FitzWilliam Dick	1,233	26.1	+12.3
Conservative	Robert Cornwallis Gun-Cunninghame	451	9.5	−4.3
Liberal	David Mahony	366	7.7	−5.7
Majority		7	0.2	N/A
Turnout		2,362 (est)	71.3 (est)	+13.6
Registered electors		3,312		
Home Rule hold		Swing	−1.0	
Home Rule gain from Conservative		Swing	+0.3	
