= Lewis Randle Starkey =

British Conservative politician

Lewis Randle Starkey (13 March 1836 – 16 September 1910) was a British Conservative politician.

== Biography ==
He was the eldest son of John Starkey of Spring Lodge, Huddersfield and his wife, Sarah Anne, daughter of Joseph Armitage, a millowner of Milnsbridge, Yorkshire. Following education at Rugby School and the University of Berlin he entered "commercial pursuits" in Yorkshire. In October 1857, he was commissioned a lieutenant in the 2nd West Yorkshire Regiment of Yeomanry. In 1858 he married his namesake, Constance Margaret, daughter of Thomas Starkey. He was appointed a deputy lieutenant of the West Riding of Yorkshire on 6 December 1867, and was promoted to captain in the Yeomanry on 22 February 1868.

In 1868 he was chosen by the Conservative Party to be a parliamentary candidate for the Southern Division of the West Riding of Yorkshire, but failed to be elected. He was the party's candidate again at the next general election in 1874, and was elected in the place of the sitting Liberal Member of Parliament, Henry F Beaumont. By this time, he was living at Heath Hall, near Wakefield. Starkey only served one term in the Commons, losing his seat at the 1880 general election.

Having left parliament, Starkey and his family moved to Norwood Park, near Southwell, Nottinghamshire in 1881. He held the office of High Sheriff of Nottinghamshire in 1891, was an alderman on Nottinghamshire County Council, and was appointed a deputy lieutenant of the county in January 1891. He was a director of the Midland Railway. Starkey's eldest son was John R Starkey, who became MP for Newark, and a baronet.

Lewis Randle Starkey died in September 1910, aged 74.

Parliament of the United Kingdom
Preceded by Walter Spencer-Stanhope; Henry Beaumont	Member of Parliament for the West Riding of Yorkshire South; 1874–1880; With: Hon. Henry Wentworth-FitzWilliam	Succeeded by Hon. Henry Wentworth-FitzWilliam; William Henry Leatham
Honorary titles
Preceded by Sir Charles Seely	High Sheriff of Nottinghamshire; 1891	Succeeded by Sir Thomas Birkin
