= William Acton (Wicklow MP) =

Irish politician (1789-1854)

Sir Ralph Howard

Member of Parliament for County Wicklow
- In office 1841–1848 Serving with Sir Ralph Howard, 1st Baronet, Viscount Milton
- Preceded by: James Grattan; Ralph Howard
- Succeeded by: Viscount Milton; Ralph Howard

Personal details
- Born: 1789
- Died: 1854 (aged 64–65)

Lieutenant Colonel William Acton (1789 – 10 April 1854) was an Irish Conservative Party politician.

Acton was educated at Trinity College Dublin. He was appointed Lieutenant-Colonel of the disembodied Wicklow Militia on 30 April 1833.

He was elected at the 1841 general election as the Member of Parliament (MP) for County Wicklow, having unsuccessfully contested the seat in 1832 and 1837. He was re-elected unopposed in 1847, but resigned the following year by taking the Chiltern Hundreds.

Parliament of the United Kingdom
Preceded by James Grattan; Sir Ralph Howard, Bt	Member of Parliament for County Wicklow; 1841–1848; With: Sir Ralph Howard, Bt to 1847; Viscount Milton from 1847	Succeeded by Viscount Milton; Sir Ralph Howard, Bt
