= William Henry Leatham =

British banker, poet and politician

William Henry Leatham (6 July 1815 – 14 November 1889) was a British banker, poet and Liberal politician.

== Life ==
He was a member of a Yorkshire Quaker family. His father was William Leatham, a banker from Heath, near Wakefield and his mother was Margaret née Walker of Leeds.

Leatham entered banking, working in Wakefield, Pontefract and Doncaster from 1836 to 1852. In 1839 he married Priscilla Gurney of Upton, West Ham. He was a justice of the peace and deputy lieutenant for the West Riding of Yorkshire, and in 1870 was deputy chairman of the West Riding quarter sessions. He made his home at Hemsworth Hall, Pontefract.

Leatham was a poet and author, writing a collection of Poems in 1840, and Tales of English Life and Miscellanies.

Politically, he was described as an "advanced Whig", and first stood for election to parliament in at Wakefield in 1852, but failed to win the seat. He was subsequently elected as MP for Wakefield in 1859, but was unseated on petition. Six years later, he was again the Liberal candidate at Wakefield, and was elected as the town's Member of Parliament. He left the Commons in 1868. In 1874 he was again a parliamentary candidate, this time for the two-seat Southern Division of the West Riding, but failed to be elected. Six years later, in 1880, he was successfully returned to parliament for the constituency. In 1885 the seat was abolished, and Leatham left parliament.

His younger brother, Edward Aldam Leatham, was MP for Huddersfield.

W H Leatham died on 14 November 1889, aged 74.

== Family ==
He married in 1839 Priscilla, daughter of Samuel Gurney of Upton, Essex, and then settled at Sandal, near Wakefield, the subject of his poem, 'Sandal in the Olden Time.' A few years after their marriage, Leatham and his wife formally joined the Church of England, purchasing in 1851 Hemsworth Hall, which passed into the possession of their eldest son, Samuel Gurney Leatham.

== Works ==
- Leatham, William Henry (1837). Poems (PDF). London: Longman.
- Leatham, William Henry (1840). A traveller's thoughts; or, Lines suggested by a tour on the continent (PDF). London: Longman.
- Leatham, William Henry (1838). The victim, a tale of the "Lake of the four cantons." (PDF). London: Longman.

Parliament of the United Kingdom
Preceded by John Charlesworth Dodgson-Charlesworth	Member of Parliament for Wakefield; May 1859 – February 1862	Vacant Writ suspended until Feb 1862 Title next held by John Charles Dalrymple-Hay
Preceded by John Charles Dalrymple Hay	Member of Parliament for Wakefield; 1865 – 1868	Succeeded by Somerset Beaumont
Preceded by Walter Spencer-Stanhope; Lewis Randle Starkey	Member of Parliament for West Riding of Yorkshire South; 1880–1885; With: Henry Wentworth-FitzWilliam	Constituency abolished
