= Henry Frederick Beaumont =

British politician

Henry Frederick Beaumont DL JP (10 March 1833, in Scarborough – 13 October 1913, in Ascot) was a British Liberal and Liberal Unionist politician.

Beaumont was the son of Henry Ralph Beaumont, son of Thomas Beaumont. His mother was Katherine, daughter of Sir George Cayley, 6th Baronet, while Wentworth Beaumont, 1st Baron Allendale, was his first cousin. His father died when he was one year old and in 1845 his mother married as her second husband James Anlaby Legard. Beaumont was educated at Eton and Trinity College, Cambridge. He sat as Member of Parliament for the West Riding of Yorkshire South from 1865 to 1874 and for Colne Valley from 1885 to 1892. He became a Liberal Unionist in 1886. He was also an Honorary Colonel in the 2nd Volunteer Battalion of the West Riding Division and a vice patron of the Yorkshire Archaeological Society. He inherited the Whitley Beaumont estate from his godfather Richard Henry Beaumont.

Beaumont married Maria Johanna, daughter of William Garthorpe, in 1857. They had two sons and eight daughters. He died in October 1913, aged 80. His wife died in July 1925.

== See also ==
- Viscount Allendale

== Names ==
Parliament of the United Kingdom
New constituency	Member of Parliament for the West Riding of Yorkshire South; 1865–1874; With: Viscount Milton 1865–1872; Walter Spencer-Stanhope 1872–1874	Succeeded by Walter Spencer-Stanhope; Lewis Randle Starkey
New constituency	Member of Parliament for Colne Valley; 1885–1892	Succeeded by Sir James Kitson, Bt
