= William Wentworth FitzWilliam Dick =

Irish politician

William Wentworth FitzWilliam Dick MP

Member of Parliament for County Wicklow
- In office 17 July 1852 – 10 April 1880 Serving with William Richard O'Byrne (1874 – 1880); Henry Wentworth-FitzWilliam (1868 – 1874); Lord Proby (succeeded as The 4th Earl of Carysfort in November 1868; 1858 – 1868); The 6th Earl Fitzwilliam (known as Viscount Milton up until October 1857; 1852 – 1858)
- Preceded by: Viscount Milton; Ralph Howard
- Succeeded by: William Joseph Corbet; James Carlile McCoan

Personal details
- Born: William Wentworth FitzWilliam Hume; 28 October 1805
- Died: 15 September 1892 (aged 86)
- Party: Conservative
- Spouse(s): Ellen Crookshank (m. 1859) Margaret Bruce Chaloner (m. 1829)
- Parent(s): William Hoare Hume; Charlotte Anna Dick

The Rt Hon. William Wentworth FitzWilliam Dick (28 October 1805 – 15 September 1892), known as William Wentworth FitzWilliam Hume until 1864, was an Irish Conservative politician.

He was elected as one of the two Members of Parliament for County Wicklow in 1852 and held the seat until 1880, when he was defeated. In 1890 he was appointed to the Privy Council of Ireland.

== Personal life ==
Dick was the son of William Hoare Hume and Charlotte Anna Dick. He married Margaret Bruce Chaloner, daughter of Robert Chaloner and Frances Laura Dundas in 1829.

However, this marriage ended for an unknown reason, and he remarried to Ellen (or Helen) Crookshank, daughter of George Crookshank, around 1860.

He was the patron of Humewood Castle in county Wicklow, Ireland, employing Victorian-Gothic architect William White and builder Kimberly, it was completed in the 1860s. [Source: William White by Gill Hunter]

Parliament of the United Kingdom
Preceded by William Wentworth-Fitzwilliam; Ralph Howard	Member of Parliament for County Wicklow; 1852 – 1880; With: William Richard O'Byrne (1874 – 1880); Henry Wentworth-FitzWilliam (1868 – 1874); Granville Proby (1858 – 1868); William Wentworth-Fitzwilliam (1852 – 1858)	Succeeded by William Joseph Corbet; James Carlile McCoan
