= William Joseph Corbet =

British politician (1824–1909)

- Corbet in 1880

Member of the British Parliament for County Wicklow
- In office 1880–1885

Member of the British Parliament for East Wicklow
- In office 1885–1892

Member of the British Parliament for East Wicklow
- In office 1895–1900

Personal details
- Born: December 12, 1824 County Offaly, Ireland
- Died: December 1, 1909 (aged 84) County Wicklow, Ireland
- Party: Home Rule League; Irish Parliamentary Party

William Joseph Corbet (12 December 1824 – 1 December 1909) was an Irish nationalist politician and Member of Parliament (MP) for constituencies in County Wicklow for most of the period from 1880 to 1900. He was also a mental health administrator, author and noted dog breeder.

== Early life ==
Third son of Robert Corbet of Ballykaneen, Queen's County (now County Offaly), by Alice, youngest daughter of John Mulhall of Clonaslee, County Offaly, he was educated at Broadwood Academy, Lancashire. He worked for 30 years in the Irish Lunacy Office, as a Clerk in 1847–53 and Chief Clerk, 1853–77.

He was elected a member of the Royal Irish Academy (MRIA) in 1874.

== Political career ==
In the 1880 general election he was elected as one of two Home Rule League members for County Wicklow, taking his seat in the House of Commons of the United Kingdom of Great Britain and Ireland. The Wicklow constituency was divided under the Redistribution of Seats Act 1885, and at the following 1885 general election he was elected by a much larger majority for the new East Wicklow constituency, and again in 1886. In the enlarged Irish Parliamentary Party, he was much older than most of his fellow MPs, who were typically born around the time of the Irish Famine in the later 1840s.

When the Irish Parliamentary Party split in December 1890 over Parnell's leadership, Corbet was one of the minority who supported Parnell. At the subsequent general election in 1892, he lost his seat to John Sweetman, an Anti-Parnellite, standing for the Irish National Federation, coming third after the Unionist candidate. However, at the general election in July 1895, at the age of 70, he fought back and won the Wicklow East seat by the narrow majority of 87 votes over the Unionist, the Anti-Parnellite this time coming third. This was in spite of the fact that Sweetman, having changed allegiance, had resigned the seat on 8 April 1895 and lost the subsequent by-election 26 April 1895 when he stood as a Parnellite candidate.

Corbet retired from Parliament at the general election of 1900.

== Personal life ==
Corbet was an enthusiastic sportsman from boyhood and owner of a famous breed of Irish red setters. He used to go shooting with Parnell, who was a fellow Wicklow resident. Parnell's brother John Howard Parnell described Corbet as Charles's 'great sporting chum'. John Parnell also quoted a verse "In Memory of the Chief", which Corbet wrote for the card issued on the first anniversary of Charles Parnell's death, 6 October 1892.

He married first, Elizabeth, daughter of Richard Jennings (she died in 1870), and, secondly, to Marie, daughter of David Fitzhenry.

== Memorial ==
The Freeman's Journal of 11 September 1911 describes the erection of a memorial tablet to Corbet in St Patrick's Roman Catholic Church, Kilquade Hill, Kilquade, Greystones, County Wicklow, and also gives an account of his life, political and literary.

== Writings ==
- Songs of My Summer Time (published under the pseudonym 'Harry Wildair'), Dublin, 1864
- The Battle of Fontenoy: A Historical Poem, Dublin, McGlashan & Gill, 1871 (revised ed. 1885)
- Ode for the Centenary of Thomas Moore, 1879
- ‘On the statistics of insanity, past and present’, Journal of the Statistical and Social Inquiry Society of Ireland, Vol.VI, Part XLVI, 1873/74, pp. 382–94
- 'Is Ireland a Nation?', The Irish Question No.19, London, Irish Press Agency, 1887
- 'On the Increase of Insanity', American Journal of Insanity, 50: 224–38, 1893
- 'The Increase of Insanity', Fortnightly Review, January 1893, pp. 7–19
- What is Home Rule?
- Parnellism or Healyism – Which?

Note: The last two publications are listed in Who Was Who but no details are given and they do not appear to be available in British or Irish libraries.

== Sources ==
- Freeman's Journal, 3 December 1909
- John Howard Parnell, Charles Stewart Parnell: A Memoir, London, Constable, 1916
- Michael Stenton & Stephen Lees, Who's Who of British members of parliament, Vol.2 1886–1918, Sussex, Harvester Press, 1978
- Brian M. Walker (ed.), Parliamentary Election Results in Ireland, 1801–1922, Dublin, Royal Irish Academy, 1978
- Who Was Who, 1897–1916

Parliament of the United Kingdom
Preceded by William O'Byrne; William Hume	Member of Parliament for County Wicklow; 1880 – 1885; With: James McCoan	Constituency divided
New constituency	Member of Parliament for East Wicklow; 1885 – 1892	Succeeded by John Sweetman
Preceded by Edward Peter O'Kelly	Member of Parliament for East Wicklow; 1895 – 1900	Succeeded by Denis Joseph Cogan
