= H. Pemberton =

British historian, traveler and writer

H. Pemberton was a British 19th-century historian, traveler, and writer. Possibly a female using a pseudonym, Pemberton wrote both fiction (i.e. Dacia Singleton) and non-fiction (i.e. The History of Monaco and A Winter Tour in Spain.)

== Criticism for The History of Monaco ==
It was reviewed in The Spectator (22 February 1868) which printed the following:

We cannot say that we feel much interest in Mr. Pemberton's subject, and the want is not supplied by his treatment of it. Monaco must be a pretty place, not only from what we remember of Tennyson's lines- HOW like a gem beneath, the city Of little Monaco basking glowed- but also from the description in one chapter of this volume. Yet we do not care to read biographical notices of a string of princes who happened to take their title from the town, and these form the staple of Mr. Pemberton's book. We notice at the end that he talks of the gainbling [sic] house as one of the " improvements " of Monaco, which reminds us of a speaker at the Oxford Union praising King Bomba for having built an arsenal.

It was considered by the London Chronicle as "contemporary literature." It was also reviewed in the Saturday Review of Politics, Literature, Science, Art, and Finance, Volume 25. Published on 13 June 1868, the review called Pemberton's history of Monaco a project that "serves nobody's purpose."

== Works ==
Several of Pemberton's works were published by the Tinsley Brothers (William and Edward Tinsley) of 18 Catherine Street, Strand, London.

=== Credited to H. Pemberton ===
- The History of Monaco: Past and Present (1867) The history of Monaco, past and present
- A Winter Tour in Spain (1868) A winter tour in Spain

=== Published anonymously ===
- Dacia Singleton (1867) (listed under "by the author of" on the cover page of A Winter Tour in Spain)
1. Volume 1
2. Volume 2
3. Volume 3
- Altogether Wrong (1870)
- The Only One of her Mother (1874) (listed as "by the author of Altogether Wrong and A Winter Tour in Spain" in Tinsleys' Magazine and The Spectator.
- What Money Can't Do (unknown date of publication) (included in list under "by the author of" on the cover page of Dacia Singleton)
- Will is the Cause of Woe ("by author of Another Wrong, Dacia Singleton, What Money Can't Do, etc.")

== Theory about authorship ==
It has been theorized that H. Pemberton was the pseudonym of "Helen Crookshank" who married a man named Augustus Pemberton Gipps. The petition for divorce filed in 1862 by Gipps against Helen on accusation of adultery cited William Wentworth FitzWilliam Dick (Member of Parliament, and himself married) as accomplice in the alleged wrong.
