= James Grattan (Wicklow MP) =

Irish Whig politician and army officer

The Right Honourable James Grattan

Member of Parliament for County Wicklow
- In office 9 February 1821 – 17 July 1841 Serving with Granville Proby (1821–1829); Ralph Howard (1829–1841)
- Preceded by: Granville Proby; William Parnell-Hayes
- Succeeded by: Ralph Howard; William Acton

Personal details
- Born: 7 April 1783
- Died: 21 October 1854 (aged 71)
- Party: Whig

James Grattan (7 April 1783 – 21 October 1854) was an Irish Whig politician and army officer.

== Family and early life ==
Grattan was the first son of Irish Patriot Party MP Henry Grattan and Henrietta née Fitzgerald, daughter of Nicholas Fitzgerald of Greensborough. He was also the brother of Henry Grattan Jnr, who was also an MP. He was educated privately and then studied at Trinity College Dublin from 1803 to 1808, before being admitted to King's Inns in 1809. In 1847, he married Lady Laura Maria Tollemache, daughter of William Tollemache, Lord Huntingtower and Catherine Rebecca née Gray. They had at least one daughter: Pauline Grattan (died 1908).

In 1810, he became a cornet in the 20th Light Dragoons, and the following year a lieutenant in 9th Regiment of Light Dragoons, before going onto half-pay in 1814. During this period, he served on the Walcheren Campaign and in the peninsula. Yet, in 1820, either he or his brother fought a bloodless duel in Hyde Park with Lord Clare after making "offensive" remarks about Clyde's father during a public meeting in Dublin.

== Political career ==
An existing member of Brooks's, Grattan was elected unopposed as Whig MP for County Wicklow at a by-election in 1821, pledging to pursue the same "principles and conduct" as his father. He was noted by James Grant as an MP with "great fluency" and "never... at a loss for words", but "ideas are of an inferior order" and having "nothing of the vehemence of his brother". Speaking with his hat under his left arm, the house could "calculate as safely on his presence as that of the Speaker himself" when Irish matters were discussed.

Attending regularly, he often divided with the Whigs on most issues, including economy, retrenchment and reduced taxation, and also voted for reform and Catholic relief, calling, in his maiden speech for the end to the Protestant "monopoly of place, which had already existed for too long"—and his career is dominated by votes and speeches on issues relating to Irish Catholics. He also voted and spoke against the Irish insurrection bill warning ministers that "they might hang and shoot, but the evil will still go on". In 1822, he again fought a duel, this time with Captain O'Grady "in consequence of a political dispute".

With these positions, and a supporter of reform and a member of the Reform Club, he held the seat until 1841 when he was defeated. In the same year, he was made a privy counsellor.

Parliament of the United Kingdom
Preceded by Granville Proby; William Parnell-Hayes	Member of Parliament for County Wicklow; 1821–1841; With: Granville Proby (1821–1829); Ralph Howard (1829–1841)	Succeeded by Ralph Howard; William Acton
