= Shillelagh, County Wicklow =

Village in County Wicklow, Ireland

Shillelagh Irish: Síol Éalaigh
- Village
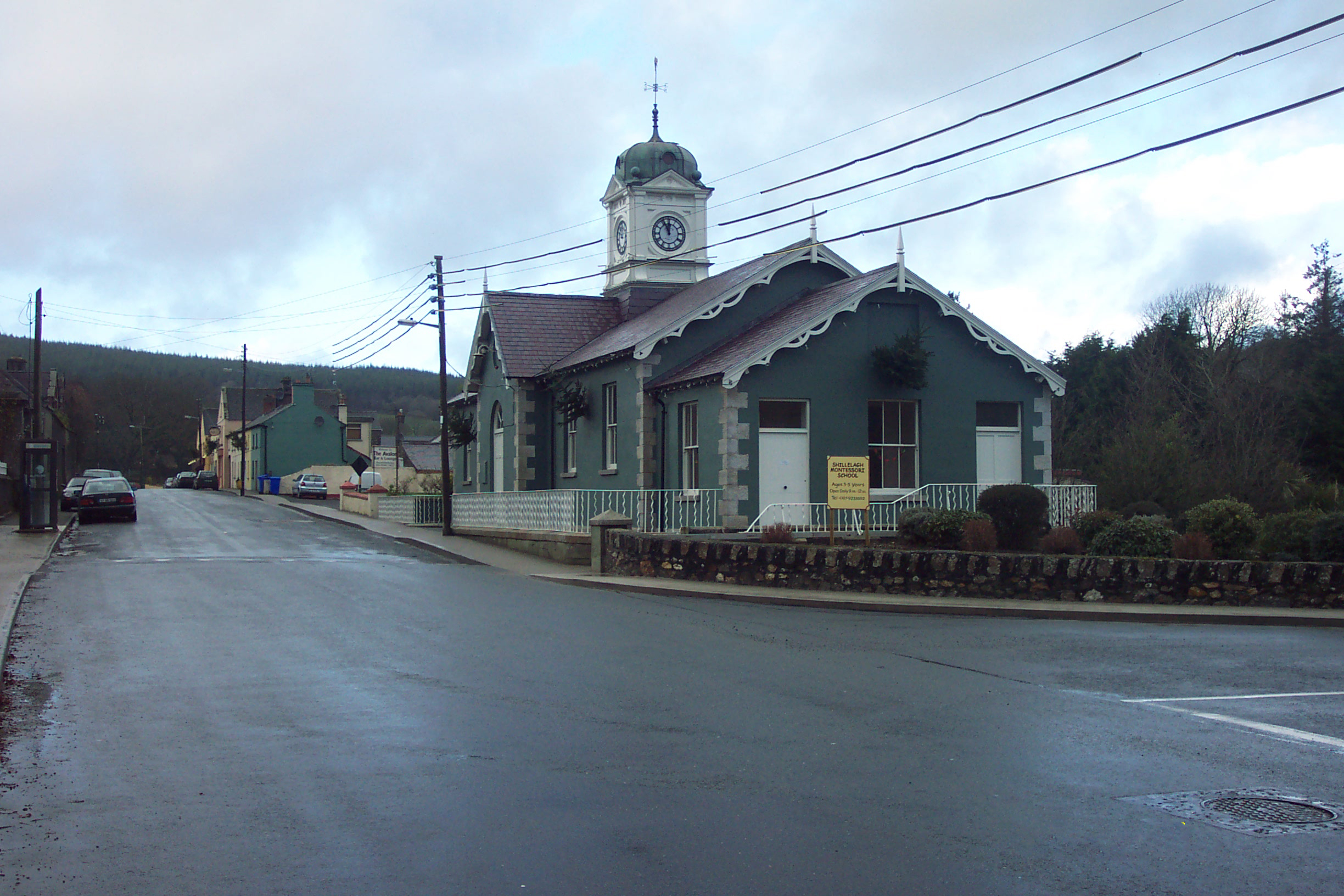
- Shillelagh Courthouse

- Location in Ireland
- Coordinates: 52.755°N 6.536°W
- Country: Ireland
- Province: Leinster
- County: County Wicklow
- Elevation: 65 m (213 ft)

Population (2016)
  - Total: 337
- Irish Grid Reference: S986681

Shillelagh (Irish: Síol Éalaigh) is a village in County Wicklow, Ireland. It is located in the south of the county, on the R725 regional road from Carlow to Gorey. The River Derry, a tributary of the River Slaney, flows through the village, while the Wicklow Way passes to the north and west.

The village was planned as part of the FitzWilliam estate in the 18th century, who had their residence at Coollattin House. In 2016, it had a population of 337.

== Sport ==
Shillelagh has a Gaelic Athletic Association team and a soccer team. The team colours are sky blue and navy. Coollattin Golf Club, an 18-hole parkland course, is located just east of the village.

== Railway ==
The village was once served by Shillelagh Railway station, which opened on 22 May 1865. It was the terminus of the 16.5 mi (26.6 km) Shillelagh branch line between Woodenbridge and Tinahely via Aughrim. It closed to passengers and goods traffic on 24 April 1944, and altogether on 20 April 1945. The station building was subsequently converted to a private residence.
