= Southern West Riding of Yorkshire =

Parliamentary constituency in the United Kingdom, 1865–1885

- Former county constituency for the House of Commons
- County: West Riding of Yorkshire

1865–1885
- Seats: Two
- Created from: West Riding of Yorkshire
- Replaced by: Barnsley, Colne Valley, Doncaster, Hallamshire, Holmfirth, Morley, Normanton and Rotherham

Southern West Riding of Yorkshire was a parliamentary constituency covering part of the historic West Riding of Yorkshire. It returned two Members of Parliament (MPs) to the House of Commons of the Parliament of the United Kingdom, elected by the bloc vote system.

== History ==
The constituency was created when the two-member West Riding of Yorkshire constituency was divided for the 1865 general election by the Birkenhead Enfranchisement Act 1861 into two new constituencies, each returning two members: Northern West Riding of Yorkshire and Southern West Riding of Yorkshire. The extra seats were taken from parliamentary boroughs which had been disenfranchised for corruption.

In the redistribution which took effect for the 1868 general election the two divisions were redistributed into three. Eastern West Riding of Yorkshire was created and the Northern and Southern divisions modified. Each of the three divisions returned two members.

All three were abolished by the Redistribution of Seats Act 1885 for the 1885 general election. The Southern division was replaced by eight new single-member constituencies: Barnsley, Colne Valley, Doncaster, Hallamshire, Holmfirth, Morley, Normanton and Rotherham.

== Boundaries ==
The place of election was at Wakefield.

From 1865 to 1868 the constituency comprised the south half of the West Riding of Yorkshire. The Birkenhead Enfranchisement Act 1861 provided that it was to contain the wapentakes of Barkston Ash, Osgoldcross, Strafforth and Tickhill, Staincross, and Agbrigg.

The Reform Act 1867, as amended by the Boundary Act 1868, re-defined the constituency (as it existed between 1868 and 1885) as the wapentakes of Agbrigg, Strafforth and Tickhill and Staincross.

== Members of Parliament ==
Election	1st Member	1st Party	2nd Member	2nd Party
1865	Viscount Milton	Liberal	Henry Beaumont	Liberal
1872	Walter Spencer-Stanhope	Conservative	Henry Beaumont	Liberal
1874	Walter Spencer-Stanhope	Conservative	Lewis Randle Starkey	Conservative
1880	Hon. Henry Wentworth-Fitzwilliam	Liberal	William Henry Leatham	Liberal
1885	constituency abolished: see Barnsley, Colne Valley, Doncaster, Hallamshire, Holmfirth, Morley, Normanton and Rotherham			

== Election results ==
General election 1880: Southern West Riding of Yorkshire
Party	Candidate	Votes	%	±%
Liberal	Henry Wentworth-Fitzwilliam	11,385	26.5	+3.7
Liberal	William Henry Leatham	11,181	26.0	+2.9
Conservative	Walter Spencer-Stanhope	10,391	24.2	−2.9
Conservative	Lewis Randle Starkey	10,020	23.3	−3.7
Majority		1,365	3.2	N/A
Majority		790	1.8	N/A
Turnout		21,489 (est)	81.6 (est)	+1.6
Registered electors		26,329		
Liberal gain from Conservative		Swing	+3.4	
Liberal gain from Conservative		Swing	+3.3	

General election 1874: Southern West Riding of Yorkshire
Party	Candidate	Votes	%	±%
Conservative	Walter Spencer-Stanhope	9,705	27.1	+2.0
Conservative	Lewis Randle Starkey	9,639	27.0	+2.9
Liberal	William Henry Leatham	8,265	23.1	−2.6
Liberal	Henry Beaumont	8,148	22.8	−2.3
Majority		1,557	4.3	N/A
Majority		1,374	3.9	N/A
Turnout		17,879 (est)	80.0 (est)	+0.6
Registered electors		22,358		
Conservative gain from Liberal		Swing	+2.2	
Conservative gain from Liberal		Swing	+2.7	

By-election, 8 Jul 1872: Southern West Riding of Yorkshire
Party	Candidate	Votes	%	±%
Conservative	Walter Spencer-Stanhope	Unopposed		
Conservative gain from Liberal				

- Caused by Wentworth-FitzWilliam's resignation.

General election 1868: Southern West Riding of Yorkshire
Party	Candidate	Votes	%	±%
Liberal	William Wentworth-FitzWilliam	8,110	25.7	−0.3
Liberal	Henry Beaumont	7,943	25.1	+0.1
Conservative	Walter Spencer-Stanhope	7,935	25.1	+0.5
Conservative	Lewis Randle Starkey	7,621	24.1	−0.3
Majority		8	0.0	−0.4
Turnout		15,805 (est)	79.4 (est)	+1.4
Registered electors		19,908		
Liberal hold		Swing	−0.2	
Liberal hold		Swing	0.0	

General election 1865: Southern West Riding of Yorkshire
Party	Candidate	Votes	%	±%
Liberal	William Wentworth-FitzWilliam	7,258	26.0	
Liberal	Henry Beaumont	6,975	25.0	
Conservative	Christopher Denison	6,884	24.6	
Conservative	Walter Spencer-Stanhope	6,819	24.4	
Majority		91	0.4	
Turnout		13,968 (est)	78.0 (est)	
Registered electors		17,903		
Liberal win (new seat)				
Liberal win (new seat)				
