= James Carlile McCoan =

James Carlile McCoan MP

Member of Parliament for County Wicklow
- In office 10 April 1880 – 24 November 1885 Serving with William Joseph Corbet
- Preceded by: William Richard O'Byrne; William Wentworth FitzWilliam Dick
- Succeeded by: Constituency abolished

Personal details
- Born: 14 July 1829 Dunlow, County Tyrone, Ireland
- Died: 13 January 1904 (aged 74) Kensington, London
- Resting place: Kensal Green, London
- Party: Liberal (from 1885)
- Other political affiliations: Independent (1881–1885); Home Rule (until 1881)
- Spouse: Augusta Janet Jenkyns (m. 1857)
- Parent(s): Clement McCoan; Sarah Carlile
- Education: London University

James Carlile McCoan (14 July 1829 – 13 January 1904) was an Irish Home Rule League, Liberal and independent politician, author and journalist.

== Early education and career ==
McCoan was educated at the Royal School, Dungannon in County Tyrone and at Homerton College, then located in Hackney and at the time affiliated with the University of London, before graduating from London University in 1848.

He then entered Middle Temple in at age 22 in 1851, before being called to the bar in 1856, where he joined the south-eastern circuit. He did not however seek practice in England, instead pursuing a journalism career and being appointed war correspondent at Charles Dickens' The Daily News during the Crimean War.

Towards the end of the war, McCoan travelled in Georgia and Circassia, before settling in Constantinople where he worked in the supreme consular court until 1864. In 1856 he founded the first English newspaper in the Ottoman Empire, The Levant Herald, which was for some time subsidised by the UK government. However, in 1870, he disposed of the paper and returned to England, where he began writing history publications.

== Political career ==
McCoan was elected MP for County Wicklow as a Protestant Home Ruler in 1880. He was renowned for attacking the government's 'coercive' legislation, and being among the Home Rulers suspended for defying the Speaker of the House of Commons' authority in 1881.

After this, he rebuked illegal activity and methods of the Home Rule League and supported William Ewart Gladstone's land bill, although he also tried to amend it. In doing so, he was renounced by the Home Rule League and then sat as an independent MP from 1881.

When the seat was split in 1885, McCoan sought re-election as a liberal candidate in Lancaster, for Southampton in 1886, and for Macclesfield in 1892.

== Family ==
McCoan was the only son of Clement McCoan of Charlemont, a village in County Armagh in Ulster, and Sarah Carlile, daughter of James Carlile of Culresoch. In 1857, he married Augusta Janet Jenkyns, daughter of William Jenkyns of Elgin, and together they had one son and one daughter.

== Works ==
McCoan's works included:

- Protestant endurance under Popish Cruelty: A narrative of the Reformation of Spain (1853)
- Consular Jurisdiction in Turkey and Egypt (1873)
- Egypt as it is (1877)
- Our New Protectorate: Turkey in Asia, its Geography, Races, Resources and Government, with Map showing existing and projected Public Works (1879)
- Egypt under Ismail: A Romance of History (1889)

Parliament of the United Kingdom
Preceded by William Richard O'Byrne; William Wentworth FitzWilliam Dick	Member of Parliament for County Wicklow; 1880 – 1885; With: William Joseph Corbet	Constituency abolished
