= Charles Fleming (American football) =

American football player (1877–1944)

Notre Dame Fighting Irish
- Position: Quarterback

Personal information
- Born: May 28, 1877; Covington, Tennessee, U.S.
- Died: May 17, 1944 (aged 66)

Career information
- College: Notre Dame

Charles Francis Fleming (May 28, 1877 – May 17, 1944) was an American college football player, and a starting quarterback and placekicker for the University of Notre Dame.

Fleming began the 1898 season by leading Notre Dame to a 5–0 victory over Illinois, including kicking the winning field goal. But following a win over Michigan State, the team traveled to Ann Arbor for the first time only to be shut out by Michigan, 23–0. Later, Fleming's team was matched up against Indiana for the first time, but fell to the Hoosiers, 11–5. The team would finish the season with a mark of 4–2.

Following his graduation, Fleming coached at Upper Iowa University in Fayette, Iowa during the 1901 and 1902 seasons. He later settled in Fort Dodge, Iowa, and later in River Grove, Illinois.
