= Walter Spencer-Stanhope (1827–1911) =

British Conservative politician and Volunteer officer

Sir Walter Thomas William Spencer-Stanhope (21 December 1827 – 17 November 1911) was a British Conservative politician and Volunteer officer.

== Background ==
He was the eldest son of John Spencer-Stanhope and grandson of Walter Spencer-Stanhope (see Spencer-Stanhope family). His mother was Lady Elizabeth Wilhelmina, daughter of Thomas Coke, 1st Earl of Leicester. John Roddam Spencer Stanhope was his younger brother.

== Military career ==
Spencer-Stanhope was a captain in the part-time 2nd West Riding Yeomanry and raised the 36th (Rotherham) Yorkshire West Riding Rifle Volunteer Corps during the invasion scare of 1859–60. When the Rifle Volunteers in Rotherham and Doncaster were brought together into an administrative battalion he was appointed lieutenant-colonel in command; this later became the 2nd Volunteer Battalion, York and Lancaster Regiment. Lieutenant-Colonel Stanhope was promoted to colonel on 1 July 1881, was awarded a CB for his Volunteer work in 1887, and received the Volunteer Decoration (VD) in 1892. He finally retired from the command in 1895 and became Honorary Colonel of the battalion. He was knighted (KCB) in 1904.

== Political career ==
Spencer-Stanhope was returned to Parliament as one of two representatives for the southern division of the West Riding of Yorkshire in an 1872 by-election, a seat he held until 1880.

== Family ==
Spencer-Stanhope married Elizabeth Julia, daughter of Sir John Buxton, 2nd Baronet, in 1856. They had eleven children: John Montague (b. 1860), Walter (b. 1861), Edward Collingwood (b. 1863), Hugh (b. 1864), Philip Bertie (b. 1868), Mary Gertrude, Cecily Winifrid (who helped her father design the ballroom at the family seat of Cannon Hall and "Fairyland" in the pleasure grounds of the estate), Margaret Isabella, Alice Mildred, Winifrid Julia, and an infant daughter who did not survive. Elizabeth Julia died in September 1880. Spencer-Stanhope survived her by over 30 years and died in November 1911, aged 83.

== Notes ==
Parliament of the United Kingdom
Preceded by Viscount Milton; Henry Beaumont	Member of Parliament for the West Riding of Yorkshire South; 1872–1880; With: Henry Beaumont 1872–1874; Lewis Randle Starkey 1874–1880	Succeeded by Hon. Henry Wentworth-FitzWilliam; William Henry Leatham
