= William Wentworth-Fitzwilliam, 7th Earl Fitzwilliam =

British politician (1872-1943)

The Right Honourable The Earl Fitzwilliam KCVO CBE DSO
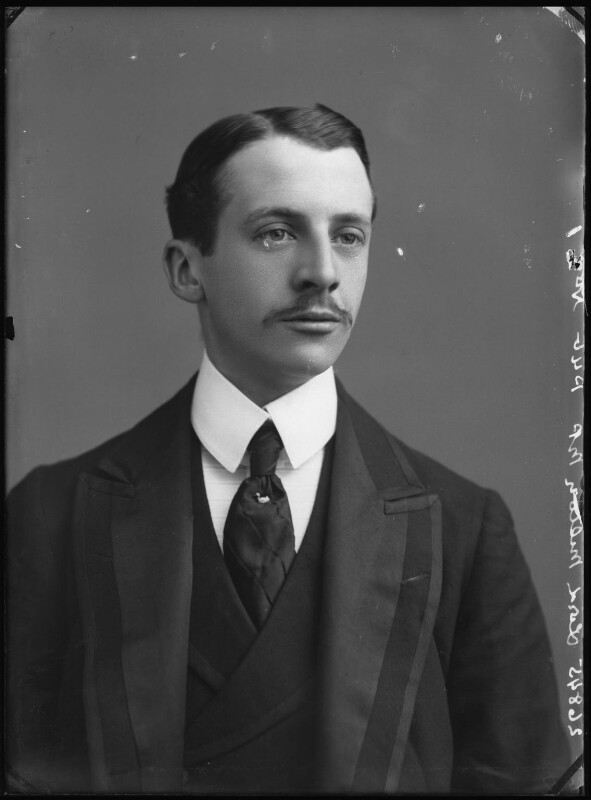
- The 7th Earl Fitzwilliam
- Born: William Charles de Meuron Wentworth-Fitzwilliam; 25 July 1872; Pointe de Meuron, Ontario, Canada
- Died: 15 February 1943 (aged 70); Wentworth Woodhouse, West Riding of Yorkshire, England
- Spouse: Lady Maud Frederica Elizabeth Dundas (m. 1896)
- Children: 5 (including Peter Wentworth-Fitzwilliam, 8th Earl Fitzwilliam)
- Parents: William Wentworth-Fitzwilliam, Viscount Milton (father); Laura Maria Theresa Beauclerk (mother)

William "Billy" Charles de Meuron Wentworth-Fitzwilliam, 7th Earl Fitzwilliam, KCVO, CBE, DSO (25 July 1872 – 15 February 1943), styled Viscount Milton from 1877 to 1902, was a British Army officer, nobleman, politician, and aristocrat.

== Early life and controversy ==
He was born in Pointe de Meuron, Ontario, Canada, to William Wentworth-Fitzwilliam, Viscount Milton, and Laura Beauclerk, granddaughter of the 8th Duke of St Albans. The unusual circumstances of his birth in a remote part of Canada's frontier lands were later to cause major controversy within the family. The accusation was that he was a 'changeling': an unrelated baby inserted into the family line, to purge the bloodline of the epilepsy from which his ostensible forebears had suffered, and to provide that arm of the family with a male heir to inherit the earldom.

His birth was registered in Thunder Bay, Ontario, on 20 August 1872. It was noted in the remarks that his parents were visiting the district "for the benefit of the health of the father, Lord Milton."

== Biography and career ==
He sat in the House of Commons for Wakefield from 1895 until 1902, when he inherited the title Earl Fitzwilliam on the death of his grandfather William Wentworth-Fitzwilliam, 6th Earl Fitzwilliam. His father William Wentworth-Fitzwilliam, Viscount Milton, had pre-deceased him.

On his succession to the Earldom, he became one of the richest men in Britain, inheriting an estate of significant land, industrial and mineral-right holdings worth £3.3 billion in 2007 terms. His sister Lady Mabel Fitzwilliam criticised his lifestyle: "he had so much and everyone else had so little".

He served 1893–94 as Aide-de-camp to Lord Lansdowne, Viceroy of India. He was promoted to captain in the 4th (Oxford Militia) Battalion, Oxfordshire Light Infantry, on 11 April 1896. Following the outbreak of the Second Boer War in late 1899, he volunteered for service with the Imperial Yeomanry where he was commissioned lieutenant on 3 February 1900, serving with the 40th (Oxfordshire) Company in the 10th Battalion. He left London the same day in the SS Montfort, and arrived in South Africa the following month. Later that year he received a staff appointment, as captain on the headquarters staff in South Africa.

In May 1902, Lord Fitzwilliam was employed on the staff of the Duke of Connaught, who was in charge of military events during the Coronation of King Edward VII and Queen Alexandra. His main duties were in organizing the auxiliary forces during the celebrations.

He was High Sheriff of Rutland for 1898–99. and Lord Mayor of Sheffield for 1909-10

== Family ==
On 24 June 1896, at St Paul's Cathedral, he married his third cousin Lady Maud Frederica Elizabeth Dundas (9 July 1877 – 15 March 1967), the daughter of the 1st Marquess of Zetland and Lady Lillian Selina Elizabeth Lumley. They were both descended from Thomas Dundas, 1st Baron Dundas who had himself married a daughter of William Fitzwilliam, 3rd Earl Fitzwilliam. They had five children;

- Lady Maud Lillian Elfreda Mary Wentworth-Fitzwilliam (19 August 1898 – 1979), married the 3rd Earl of Wharncliffe, on 24 March 1918, and had five children:
  - Lady Ann Lavinia Maud Montagu-Stuart-Wortley-Mackenzie (b. 25 January 1919- January 2022)
  - Lady Mary Diana Montagu-Stuart-Wortley (2 June 1920 – 19 September 1997), married Henry Pelham-Clinton-Hope, 9th Duke of Newcastle, and had issue
  - Lady Barbara Maureen Montagu-Stuart-Wortley-Mackenzie (26 August 1921 – 13 December 2014)
  - Lady Mary Rosemary Marie-Gabrielle Montagu-Stuart-Wortley-Mackenzie (b. 11 June 1930)
  - Alan James Montagu-Stuart-Wortley-Mackenzie, 4th Earl of Wharncliffe (23 March 1935 – 1987)
- Lady Marjorie Joan Mary Wentworth-Fitzwilliam (19 October 1900 – 11 September 2001), married twice: on 4 October 1925, to Lt.-Col. Sir Grimond Picton Phillips (marriage dissolved 1949); on 6 October 1949, to Lt.-Col William Wallace Smith Smith-Cuninghame. Lady Joan had one son:
  - Griffith William Grismond Phillips (b 19 May 1935)
- Lady Donatia Faith Mary Wentworth-Fitzwilliam (14 March 1904 – 20 October 1943), married, on 3 June 1925, to Lt.-Col. Burton William Ellis Gething
- Lady Helena Albreda Marie Gabrielle Wentworth-Fitzwilliam (25 May 1907 – 14 September 1970), married twice: on 9 April 1938, to Chetwode Charles Hamilton Hilton-Green; on 16 June 1966, to Edward Greenall, 2nd Baron Daresbury. Lady Helena had one daughter:
  - Julia Mary Hamilton Hilton-Green (b. 22 September 1938)
- William Henry Lawrence Peter Wentworth-Fitzwilliam, 8th Earl Fitzwilliam (31 December 1910 – 13 May 1948)
  - Lady Anne Juliet Dorothea Maud Wentworth-Fitzwilliam (b. 1935)

== Mining and business interests ==
The family operated coal mines, reputedly employing over 2,000 men at their peak, along with interests in glass, pottery, tar, chemicals and cars. Ongoing real estate investment developed the estate into one of England's most significant landholdings. Nationalization of coal in 1947, coupled with successive death taxes "reduced the estates during the latter half of the twentieth century from over 20,000 to 15,000 acres today."

Earl Fitzwilliam, known as "Billy", ruled with a gentle touch, ensuring the Fitzwilliam collieries were the safest, and that his workers received help during economic blights, including the 1926 General Strike, when he taught miners on pit ponies how to play polo on his front lawn, and fed them during their eight months without pay.

The Countess Maud Fitzwilliam was an avid horsewoman who had also become a champion for pit pony rights, serving as president of the Association for the Prevention of Cruelty to Pit Ponies. She was also a benefactress of mining families working in her husband's collieries.

== Death ==
He died at the family's seat, Wentworth Woodhouse, on 15 February 1943.

Parliament of the United Kingdom
Preceded by Albany Charlesworth	Member of Parliament for Wakefield; 1895–1902	Succeeded by Edward Brotherton
Preceded by Thomas Bartholomew Curran	Baby of the House; 1895–1898	Succeeded by Samuel Scott
Peerage of Ireland
Preceded by William Wentworth-Fitzwilliam	Earl Fitzwilliam; 1902–1943	Succeeded by Peter Wentworth-Fitzwilliam
Peerage of Great Britain
Preceded by William Wentworth-Fitzwilliam	Earl Fitzwilliam; 1902–1943	Succeeded by Peter Wentworth-Fitzwilliam
