= Charles James Fleming =

British barrister and politician

Charles Fleming

Charles James Fleming, KC (26 November 1839 – 25 December 1904) was a British barrister and Liberal Party politician. He sat in the House of Commons from 1892 to 1895, but his parliamentary career was cut short when he fell out with the Liberal Party in his constituency. His business ventures failed, and he was made bankrupt.

== Career ==
Fleming was the oldest son of Lionel Fleming of Manchester and Sale and his wife Anne, the daughter of Edward Rice Haywood from Liverpool. He was educated privately, and then joined the Uncovenanted Civil Service in Bombay, working in the financial department. He was called to the bar at Gray's Inn in 1872, and practised on the Northern Circuit, becoming a Queen's Counsel in July 1893. In 1869 he married Georgina Brown, the youngest daughter of James Brown from Eccles.

He unsuccessfully contested the borough of Pontefract at the 1886 general election, and at the 1892 general election he was elected as the Member of Parliament (MP) for the Doncaster division of the West Riding of Yorkshire, defeating the sitting Liberal Unionist MP Henry Wentworth-FitzWilliam. In January 1894 the Doncaster Liberal Council decided not to adopt him as their candidate for the next election, resolving:

"That, after what has transpired between their member of Parliament and the executive, this meeting is of the opinion that Mr. C. J. Fleming, M.P. for the Doncaster division of Yorkshire, no longer retains the confidence of the Liberal party in the division. This Executive therefore recommend the Liberal Council at its annual meeting to adopt another candidate for the next election, while wishing Mr Fleming to retain his seat during the present Parliament and the executive to take steps to secure another candidate."

At the 1895 general election he stood unsuccessfully as the Liberal candidate in the borough of Dudley.

Meanwhile, Fleming had not practised law since 1891 or 1892, and had engaged in a series of unsuccessful business ventures.

In 1891 he had become the owner of a newspaper called the Weekly Review, but it ran for only 13 weeks and he lost £1,600. From 1893 to 1896 he was a director of a mining exploration company in Western Australia, and in 1897 obtained an option to purchase on two music halls in Paris. He hoped to profit from this by floating a company to take over the options, but flotation attempts failed in both London and Paris, and the options expired in November 1897.

This failure combined with a fall in the value of his Australian shares to leave him bankrupt by 1898, although the Official Receiver concluded that without the speculation in Paris, Fleming would probably not have become insolvent. In November 1898, Fleming's application for discharge from bankruptcy was opposed by the Official Receiver on the grounds that the debtor had contributed to his bankruptcy by rash and hazardous speculations.

== Sources ==
- "Court Circular: new Queen's Counsel". The Times. London. 11 July 1893. p. 8, col C. ISSN 0140-0460.
- Craig, F. W. S. (1989) [First published 1974]. British parliamentary election results 1885–1918 (2nd ed.). Chichester: Parliamentary Research Services. p. 170. ISBN 0-900178-27-2.
- "Election Intelligence". The Times. London. 29 January 1894. p. 7, col F. ISSN 0140-0460.
- "The General Election. Biographies Of Candidates". The Times. London. 1 July 1892. p. 5, col D. ISSN 0140-0460.
- "Queen's Bench Division. In Re Fleming". The Times. London. 4 November 1898. p. 13, col B. ISSN 0140-0460.

Parliament of the United Kingdom
Preceded by Henry Wentworth-FitzWilliam	Member of Parliament for Doncaster; 1892–1895	Succeeded by Frederick Fison
