= William Wentworth-Fitzwilliam, 6th Earl Fitzwilliam =

British peer, nobleman and Liberal Party politician

The Right Honourable The Earl FitzWilliam KG
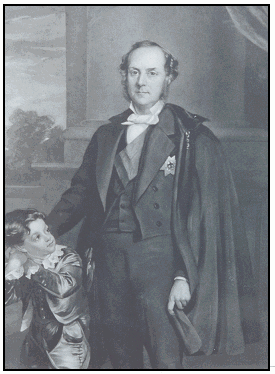
- The 6th Earl FitzWilliam
- Born: William Thomas Spencer Wentworth-FitzWilliam; 12 October 1815
- Died: 20 February 1902 (aged 86)
- Education: Eton College; Trinity College, Cambridge
- Spouse: Lady Frances Harriet Douglas
- Children: 14 (including William Wentworth-FitzWilliam, Viscount Milton)
- Parents: Charles Wentworth-Fitzwilliam, 5th Earl Fitzwilliam (father); Hon. Mary Dundas (mother)

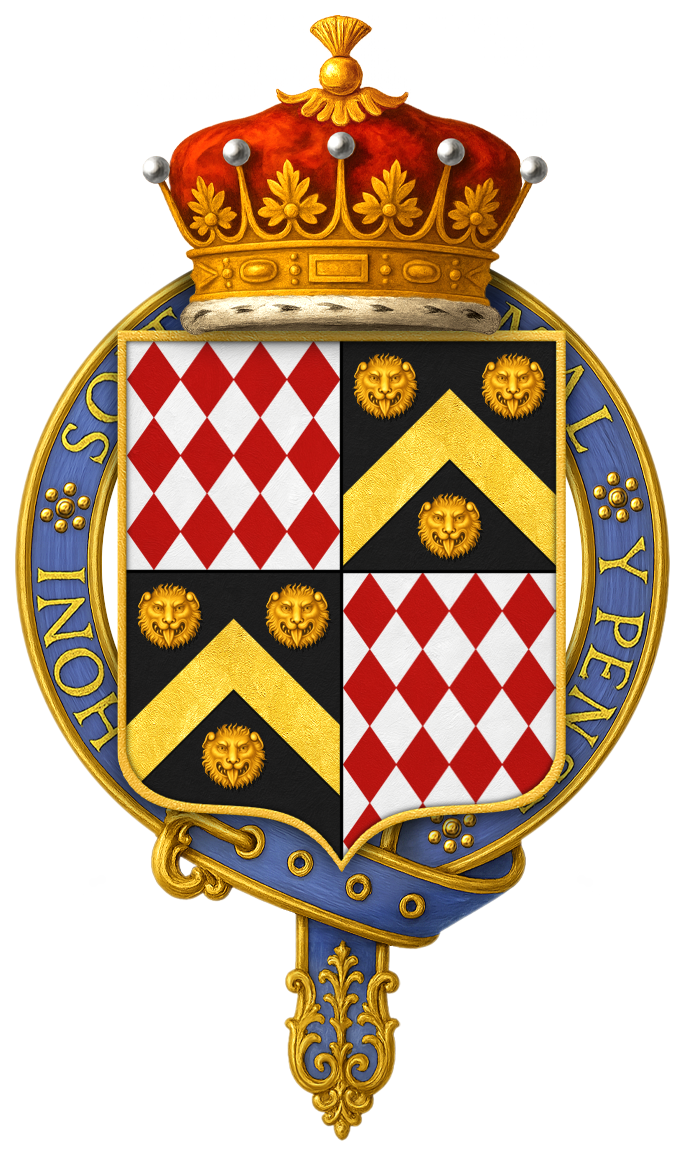
Quartered arms of William Wentworth-Fitzwilliam, 6th Earl Fitzwilliam, as displayed on his Order of the Garter stall plate in St. George's Chapel.

William Thomas Spencer Wentworth-FitzWilliam, 6th Earl FitzWilliam (12 October 1815 – 20 February 1902), styled Hon. William Wentworth-Fitzwilliam 1815–1835, and Viscount Milton 1835–1857, was a British peer, nobleman, and Liberal Party politician. One of England's richest men when he died, he left a colossal sum of £3 billion (in 2008 money) making his fortune from Yorkshire coal.

== Biography ==
Wentworth-Fitzwilliam was the second son of Charles Wentworth-FitzWilliam, 5th Earl FitzWilliam and his wife, Hon. Mary Dundas, daughter of Thomas Dundas, 1st Baron Dundas. He was educated at Eton and Trinity College, Cambridge, where he graduated MA in 1837. Two years earlier, his elder brother had died without male issue, and he became heir to his father's estates and took the courtesy title Viscount Milton. He became Member of Parliament for Malton in 1837. Holding the seat until 1841, he later reclaimed it in 1846 and then sat for County Wicklow from 1847 until 1857, the year he inherited his father's earldom.

He was a JP for the county of the West Riding, DL and a County Councillor for County Wicklow in Ireland.

He held the command of the 1st West Yorkshire Yeomanry Cavalry for 40 years, from 1846 to 1886, and was a Yeomanry Aide-de-camp to Queen Victoria's Viceroy in India, 1884–1894. Promoted Major for the 3rd battalion Oxfordshire and Buckinghamshire Light Infantry, he also held a number of other military posts. In the territorial army, he was lieutenant-colonel of West Riding RHA with a temporary rank in the British Army during wartime. Lord FitzWilliam was a keen sportsman and continued fox hunting throughout his life. In 1852, under the name of Viscount Milton, he played in a match for Sheffield Cricket Club against Manchester Cricket Club, scoring nine runs in his only innings.

In 1857, Lord FitzWilliam was appointed Lord Lieutenant of the West Riding of Yorkshire and stayed as such until 1892. He was appointed a Knight of the Garter in 1862, and was the senior knight at the time of his death. He died at his residence Wentworth Woodhouse, in Rotherham, on 20 February 1902. As his eldest son predeceased him, his titles passed to his grandson, William Wentworth-Fitzwilliam, 7th Earl of Fitzwilliam. His will was proven on 24 June 1902, with his estate valued at £2,881,619 7s. 4d. (equivalent to £306,229,460 in 2025).

He owned 115,000 acres, including almost 90,000 in County Wicklow.

== Family ==
On 10 September 1838, Lord Fitzwilliam married Lady Frances Harriet Douglas, the eldest daughter of George Douglas, 17th Earl of Morton. Lady FitzWilliam died on 16 June 1895. They had fourteen children:

- William Wentworth-Fitzwilliam, Viscount Milton (1839–1877), politician.
- Hon. William Henry Wentworth-FitzWilliam (26 December 1840 – 10 July 1920), politician; married on 11 July 1877 to Lady Mary Butler, daughter of John Butler, 2nd Marquess of Ormonde.
- Lady Frances Mary Wentworth-Fitzwilliam (c. 1842 – 28 September 1903); married on 18 November 1867 to Charles Mervyn Doyne. They had five children:
  - Major Robert Wentworth Doyne (30 December 1868 – 25 September 1942); married Mary, daughter of Henry Lascelles, 4th Earl of Harewood, and had issue
  - Kathleen Doyne (29 September 1870 – January 1938)
  - Dermot Henry Doyne (21 November 1871 – 3 July 1942)
  - Eveleen Margaret Doyne (26 January 1876 – 28 February 1962)
  - Bridget Frances Doyne (5 October 1879 – June 1921)
- Hon. Margaret Mary Wentworth-Fitzwilliam (1844 – 1844)
- Lady Mary Wentworth-Fitzwilliam (1845 – 1921); married on 23 May 1872 to the Hon. Hugh Le Despencer Boscawen (1849–1908), son of Evelyn Boscawen, 6th Viscount Falmouth (1819–1889)
- Hon. William Thomas Wentworth-Fitzwilliam (7 October 1846 – 23 March 1896); married on 21 December 1876 to Elgiva Mary Kinglake. They had one daughter:
  - Elgiva Mary Kathorn Fitzwilliam (d. 24 April 1963)
- Hon. William Charles Wentworth-Fitzwilliam GCVO (1848–1925), courtier; married on 31 October 1882 to married Constance Anne, daughter of Henry Brocklehurst. They had one son:
  - Eric Spencer Wentworth-Fitzwilliam, 9th Earl Fitzwilliam (4 December 1883 – 3 April 1952)
- Hon. William John Wentworth-Fitzwilliam (7 August 1852 – 11 September 1889), politician.
- Lady Albreda Mary Wentworth-Fitzwilliam (19 January 1855 – 9 October 1933); married on 18 December 1895 to Hon. Charles Fowler Bourke, son of Robert Bourke, 5th Earl of Mayo.
- Hon. William George Frederick Wentworth-Fitzwilliam (1857 – 19 September 1857)
- Lady Charlotte Mary Wentworth-Fitzwilliam (1858 – 1948)
- Hon. William Hugh Spencer Wentworth-Fitzwilliam (10 January 1860 – 28 March 1917); married on 18 October 1901 to Lady Ada Charlotte Godolphin Osborne (30 May 1870 – 9 April 1944), daughter of George Godolphin Osborne, 9th Duke of Leeds.
- Hon. William Reginald Wentworth-Fitzwilliam (12 April 1862 – 7 July 1906); married on 2 February 1893 to Edith Isabella Georgina Lane-Fox.
- Lady Alice Mary Wentworth-Fitzwilliam (1869–1922)

== Sources ==
Parliament of the United Kingdom
Preceded by John Ramsden; John Walbanke-Childers	Member of Parliament for Malton; 1837–1841; With: John Walbanke-Childers	Succeeded by John Walbanke-Childers; Evelyn Denison
Preceded by John Walbanke-Childers; Evelyn Denison	Member of Parliament for Malton; 1846–1847; With: Evelyn Denison	Succeeded by John Walbanke-Childers; Evelyn Denison
Preceded by Sir Ralph Howard; William Acton	Member of Parliament for County Wicklow; 1847–1857; With: William Acton 1847–1848; Sir Ralph Howard 1848–1852; William Wentworth-Fitzwilliam-Hume 1852–1858	Succeeded by William Wentworth-Fitzwilliam-Hume; Lord Proby
Honorary titles
Preceded by The Earl of Harewood	Lord Lieutenant of the West Riding of Yorkshire; 1857–1892	Succeeded by The Earl of Scarbrough
Peerage of Ireland
Preceded by Charles Wentworth-FitzWilliam	Earl FitzWilliam; 1857–1902	Succeeded by William Wentworth-FitzWilliam
Peerage of Great Britain
Preceded by Charles Wentworth-Fitzwilliam	Earl Fitzwilliam; 1857–1902	Succeeded by William Wentworth-Fitzwilliam
