= Earl Fitzwilliam =

Earldom in the Peerage of Great Britain

- Quarterly, 1st and 4th: Lozengy argent and gules (Fitzwilliam); 2nd and 3rd: sable, a chevron between three leopards' faces, or (Wentworth)
- Creation date: 1716 (Ireland); 1746 (Great Britain)
- Created by: George I (Ireland); George II (Great Britain)
- Peerage: Peerage of Ireland; Peerage of Great Britain
- First holder: William Fitzwilliam, 3rd Baron Fitzwilliam
- Last holder: Thomas Wentworth-Fitzwilliam, 10th Earl Fitzwilliam
- Remainder to: Heirs male of the first earl's body lawfully begotten
- Subsidiary titles: Viscount Milton; Baron Fitzwilliam
- Extinction date: 21 September 1979
- Former seats: Wentworth Woodhouse; Milton Hall; Coollattin House
- Motto: Appetitus rationi pareat ("Let your desires be ruled by reason")

Earl Fitzwilliam (or FitzWilliam) was a title in both the Peerage of Ireland and the Peerage of Great Britain held by the head of the Fitzwilliam family (later Wentworth-Fitzwilliam).

== History ==
The Fitzwilliams acquired extensive holdings in the south of the West Riding of Yorkshire, largely through strategic marital alliances. In 1410, Sir John Fitzwilliam of Sprotborough, who died in 1421, married Margaret Clarell, daughter of Thomas Clarell of Aldwark, the descendant of a major Norman landholding family. This is how the Fitzwilliams acquired the Clarell holdings.

Sir William Fitzwilliam (c. 1460–1534) was an Alderman and Sheriff of London and acquired the Milton Hall estate in Peterborough in 1502. His grandson Sir William Fitzwilliam served as Lord Deputy of Ireland from 1571 to 1575 and from 1588 to 1594; he supervised the execution of the death sentence on Mary, Queen of Scots.

=== Baron Fitzwilliam ===
His grandson William Fitzwilliam (d. 1643) was raised to the Peerage of Ireland as Lord Fitzwilliam, Baron of Liffer, alias Lifford, in the County of Donegal, in 1620. He was the first Baron FitzWilliam.

His son was William FitzWilliam, 2nd Baron FitzWilliam (c.1609 – 21 February 1658).

His son William became 3rd Baron FitzWilliam.

=== Earl Fitzwilliam ===
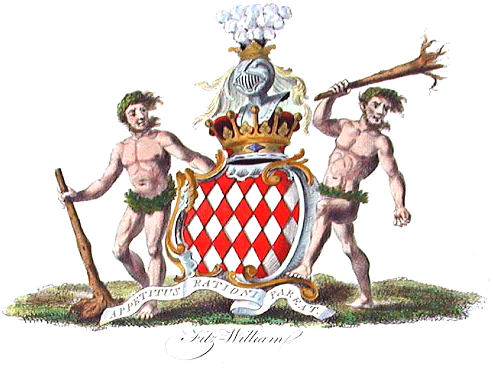
Arms of Fitzwilliam: Lozengy argent and gules

The 3rd Baron FitzWilliam succeeded his father in 1658, and in 1716 was created the first Earl Fitzwilliam, of the County of Tyrone with the subsidiary title Viscount Milton, in the County of Westmeath, also in the Peerage of Ireland. The eldest son of the Earl Fitzwilliam bore the courtesy title Viscount Milton. He was succeeded by his son, the second Earl.

The second Earl, John Fitzwilliam, sat as member of parliament for Peterborough. On his death, the titles passed to his son, the third Earl.

The third Earl, William Fitzwilliam, also represented Peterborough in the House of Commons. In April 1742 he was created Lord Fitzwilliam, Baron of Milton in the County of Northampton, in the Peerage of Great Britain, and in 1746 he was further honoured when he was made Earl Fitzwilliam, of Norborough with the subsidiary title Viscount Milton, both in the County of Northampton, also in the Peerage of Great Britain. Lord Fitzwilliam married Lady Anne Watson-Wentworth (died 1769), daughter of Thomas Watson-Wentworth, 1st Marquess of Rockingham, and sister of Charles Watson-Wentworth, 2nd Marquess of Rockingham. He was succeeded by his son, the fourth Earl.

The fourth Earl, William Fitzwilliam, was a prominent Whig politician and served as Lord President of the Council and as Lord-Lieutenant of Ireland. In 1782 he inherited the Watson-Wentworth estates (including Wentworth Woodhouse) on the death of his uncle Lord Rockingham, which made him one of the greatest landowners in the country. When he died the titles passed to his son, the fifth Earl.

The fifth Earl, Charles Wentworth-Fitzwilliam, represented several constituencies in the House of Commons and was made a Knight of the Garter in 1851. In 1856 Lord Fitzwilliam assumed by Royal licence the additional surname of Wentworth. He was succeeded by his second but eldest surviving son, the sixth Earl.

The sixth Earl was William Wentworth-Fitzwilliam. He sat as member of parliament for Malton and County Wicklow and served as Lord Lieutenant of the West Riding of Yorkshire. His eldest son William FitzWilliam, Viscount Milton, was also a member of parliament but predeceased his father. Lord Fitzwilliam was therefore succeeded by his grandson, the seventh Earl. Also, Lady Mabel Fitzwilliam, a socialist politician and "an ardent pioneer in education and social welfare", was a granddaughter of the 6th Earl.

The seventh Earl was William Wentworth-Fitzwilliam (25 July 1872 – 15 February 1943), the eldest son of Viscount Milton (William Wentworth Fitzwilliam). He represented Wakefield in Parliament as a Liberal Unionist. When he died the titles passed to his son, the eighth Earl.

The eighth Earl was Peter Wentworth-Fitzwilliam (31 December 1910 – 13 May 1948). He was killed in an air crash in France. On his early death the line of the eldest son of the sixth Earl failed and titles passed to the late Earl's first cousin once removed, the ninth Earl.

The ninth Earl was Eric Spencer Wentworth-Fitzwilliam (4 December 1883 – 3 April 1952). He was the son of Captain the Hon. Sir William Charles Wentworth-Fitzwilliam, fourth son of the sixth Earl. When he died in 1952 this line of the family also failed and the titles were inherited by his second cousin, the tenth Earl.

The tenth Earl was William Thomas George Wentworth-Fitzwilliam (28 May 1904 – 21 September 1979). He was the son of George Charles Wentworth-Fitzwilliam, son of the Hon. George Wentworth-FitzWilliam, MP, third son of the fifth Earl. He and his wife had no children.

=== After extinction ===
On the death of the tenth Earl, all the titles became extinct. The family seat of Wentworth Woodhouse was sold while the more than 80,000-acre (320 km^{2}) estate including much of the town of Malton, North Yorkshire, was retained. The other family seat, Milton Hall, and its considerable estate of over 50,000 acres (200 km^{2}) together with valuable properties in Peterborough and the surrounding area continue by descent in the family.

Bourne Park House and Estate, near Canterbury, Kent, England, remains in the ownership of Lady Juliet Tadgell, née Wentworth-Fitzwilliam, the only child of the 8th Earl by his wife the former Olive Dorothea Plunket. Much of the Fitzwilliam art collection is still housed here.

== Estates and residences ==
=== Estates ===
In the 1883 edition of John Bateman's The Great Landowners of Great Britain and Ireland, William Wentworth-Fitzwilliam, 6th Earl Fitzwilliam's estates were recorded as spanning 115,743 acres across England and Ireland, including 22,192 acres in Yorkshire, 881 acres in Northamptonshire, 522 acres in Cambridgeshire, 308 acres in Derbyshire, 75 acres in Huntingdonshire, 17 acres in Lincolnshire, 89,891 acres in County Wicklow, 1,532 acres in County Kildare and 325 acres in County Wexford, which produced a combined annual income of £138,801.

Several of the family's ancestral estates, including Milton Park, were recorded separately under the ownership of the 6th Earl's nephew, George Charles Fitzwilliam; these comprised 23,318 acres, including 18,116 acres in Northamptonshire and 5,202 acres in Huntingdonshire, which produced a combined annual income of £39,547. Charles Wentworth-Fitzwilliam, 5th Earl Fitzwilliam had bequeathed these estates to his younger son, the Hon. George Wentworth-FitzWilliam, who was the father of the George Charles Fitzwilliam. George Charles' son Thomas later succeeded as 10th Earl Fitzwilliam in 1952.

=== London residences ===
In 1782 William Fitzwilliam, 4th Earl Fitzwilliam inherited the lease of No. 4 Grosvenor Square from his uncle Charles Watson-Wentworth, 2nd Marquess of Rockingham. The house, described as the largest of the mansions in Grosvenor Square, remained as the London residence of the 4th Earl, and later his son Charles Wentworth-Fitzwilliam, 5th Earl Fitzwilliam until 1865. In 1854 the 5th Earl was reportedly considering the renewal of the leasehold in anticipation of its expiry, which was set to occur in 1865. He ultimately decided against renewal after the agents of the freeholder, Richard Grosvenor, 2nd Marquess of Westminster informed Lord Fitzwilliam that the house would need to be rebuilt as a condition of the lease being renewed. The 5th Earl died in 1857, and his second son and successor William Wentworth-Fitzwilliam, 6th Earl Fitzwilliam, inherited leasehold for the final eight years of its term.

Upon vacating No. 4 Grosvenor Square, the 6th Earl purchased the leasehold of No 19 Grosvenor Square (later renumbered as No. 20) 1865; No. 4 was subsequently demolished and new house was constructed in its place. The 6th Earl repurchased the leasehold of the site and the new house in 1871. 4 Grosvenor Square remained as the family's London residence until his grandson, the 7th Earl Fitzwilliam surrendered the lease in early 1931, after which a new lease of No. 4 Grosvenor Square was granted by the Grosvenor Estate to the Italian Government to house the Italian Embassy to the United Kingdom.

In February 1931 the 7th Earl purchased No. 10 Chesterfield Street (which was held on an 800-year lease), which remained as his London residence until the house was requisitioned by the Foreign Office during the Second World War. The house continued to be requisitioned by the British Government following the conclusion of the war, and it was occupied by the Ministry of Works during the early 1950s.

No. 10 Chesterfield Street was eventually de-requisitioned in April 1953; in September of the same year the leasehold was sold for £35,000 to the Institute of Production Engineers.

== Titleholders ==
=== Baron Fitzwilliam (1620) ===
- William Fitzwilliam, 1st Baron Fitzwilliam (died 1644)
- William Fitzwilliam, 2nd Baron Fitzwilliam (c. 1609–1658)
- William Fitzwilliam, 3rd Baron Fitzwilliam (1643–1719) (created Earl Fitzwilliam in 1716)

=== Earl Fitzwilliam (1716; 1746) ===
- William Fitzwilliam, 1st Earl Fitzwilliam (1643–1719)
- John Fitzwilliam, 2nd Earl Fitzwilliam (1681–1728)
- William Fitzwilliam, 3rd Earl Fitzwilliam (1719–1756) (created Earl Fitzwilliam in the Peerage of Great Britain in 1746)
- William Fitzwilliam, 4th Earl Fitzwilliam (1748–1833)
- Charles William Wentworth-Fitzwilliam, 5th Earl Fitzwilliam (1786–1857)
  - William Charles Wentworth-FitzWilliam, Viscount Milton (1812–1835)
- William Thomas Spencer Wentworth-Fitzwilliam, 6th Earl Fitzwilliam (1815–1902)
  - William Wentworth-FitzWilliam, Viscount Milton (1839–1877)
- William Charles de Meuron Wentworth-Fitzwilliam, 7th Earl Fitzwilliam (1872–1943)
- (William Henry Lawrence) Peter Wentworth-Fitzwilliam, 8th Earl Fitzwilliam (1910–1948)
- Eric Spencer Wentworth-Fitzwilliam, 9th Earl Fitzwilliam (1883–1952)
- (William) Thomas George Wentworth-Fitzwilliam, 10th Earl Fitzwilliam (1904–1979)

== See also ==
- Marquess of Rockingham
- Earl Fitzwilliam's private railway
- Viscount FitzWilliam, peerage of Ireland, an unrelated family.
