= George Douglas, 17th Earl of Morton =

Scottish Tory politician

George Sholto Douglas, 17th Earl of Morton (23 December 1789 – 31 March 1858), known as George Douglas until 1827, was a Scottish Tory politician.

Douglas was the son of the Hon. John Douglas, second son of James Douglas, 14th Earl of Morton. His mother was Lady Frances, daughter of Edward Lascelles, 1st Earl of Harewood. He succeeded his cousin in the earldom in 1827 and was elected a Scottish representative peer in 1828. He served as a Lord-in-waiting (government whip in the House of Lords) from 1841 to 1846 in the second Tory administration of Sir Robert Peel and in 1852 in the first Conservative administration of the Earl of Derby.

Lord Morton married Frances Theodora, daughter of Sir George Henry Rose, in 1817. Their second son the Hon. George Henry Douglas became an Admiral in the Royal Navy. Lord Morton died in March 1858, aged 68, and was succeeded in the earldom by his eldest son Sholto. Lady Morton died in 1879.

Political offices
Preceded by ?	Lord-in-waiting; 1852	Succeeded by The Marquess of Ormonde
Peerage of Scotland
Preceded by George Douglas	Earl of Morton; 1827–1858	Succeeded by Sholto John Douglas
