= William Wentworth-Fitzwilliam, Viscount Milton =

British nobleman, explorer and Liberal Party politician

Viscount Milton MP
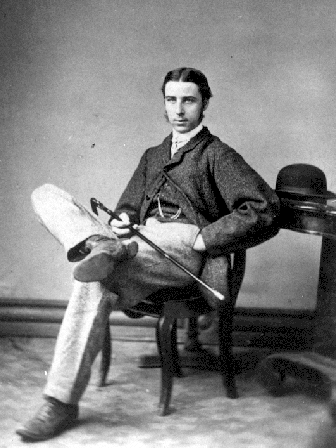
- Born: 27 July 1839
- Died: 17 January 1877 (aged 37)
- Education: Eton College
- Alma mater: Trinity College, Cambridge
- Occupations: Explorer and Politician
- Spouse: Laura Maria Theresa Beauclerk (m. 1867)
- Children: 4 (including William Wentworth-FitzWilliam, 7th Earl FitzWilliam and Lady Mabel Fitzwilliam)
- Parents: William Wentworth-Fitzwilliam (father); Lady Frances Harriet (mother)

William Wentworth-Fitzwilliam, Viscount Milton MP (27 July 1839 – 17 January 1877) was a British nobleman, explorer, and Liberal Party politician.

== Early life ==
Fitzwilliam was the eldest son of William Wentworth-FitzWilliam, 6th Earl FitzWilliam, and his wife Lady Frances Harriet Douglas, daughter of George Douglas, 17th Earl of Morton.

An epileptic, William was educated at Eton and Trinity College, Cambridge.

== Career ==
Arriving in Quebec City in July 1862, Milton and Dr Walter Butler Cheadle traveled across the North American continent, wintering near Fort Carlton. After a challenging and at times humorous summer they reached Victoria, BC. Together with Butler Cheadle, he traveled up the Athabasca River and in 1863 they became the first "tourists" to travel through the Yellowhead Pass.

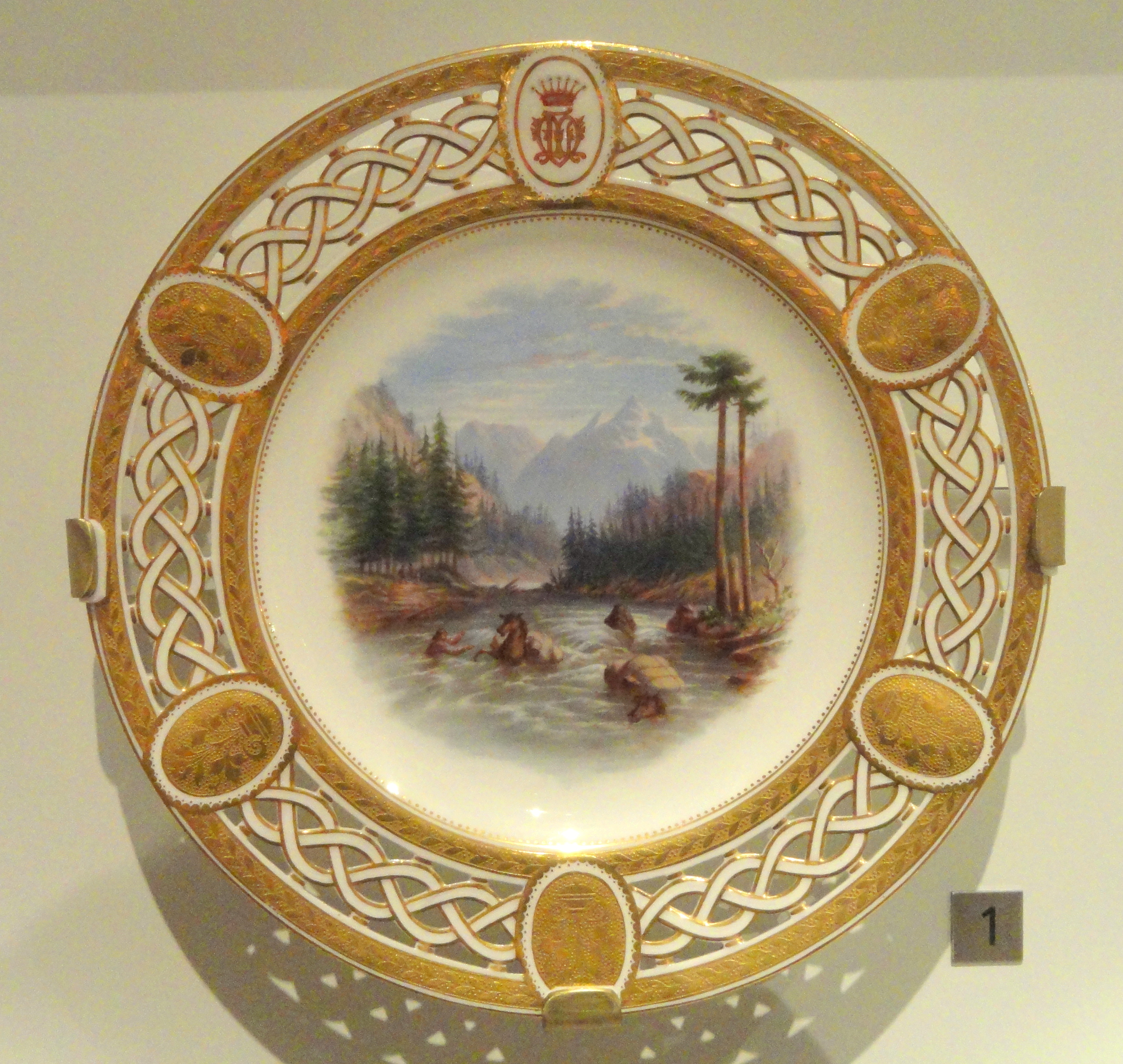
The Assiniboine Rescues Bucephalus, a Mintons plate with a scene from The North-West Passage by Land

They later co-authored "The North-West Passage by Land" and " Voyage de l'Atlantique au Pacifique, à travers le Canada", which described their expedition in considerable detail.

Following his adventure in Canada, Milton entered politics and became one of the youngest members of the House of Commons. He represented the West Riding of Yorkshire South between 1865 and 1872.

== Marriage and issue ==
On 10 August 1867, in London, Lord Milton married his third cousin Laura Maria Theresa Beauclerk (1849–1886), daughter of Lord Charles Beauclerk (a son of the 8th Duke of St Albans). They were both descended from William Ponsonby, 2nd Earl of Bessborough, whose daughters were Charlotte Fitzwilliam, Countess Fitzwilliam and Catherine Beauclerk, Duchess of St Albans. They had one son and three daughters;

- Lady Laura Mary Wentworth-Wentworth-Fitzwilliam (1869–1936), who married Maj. George Sholto Douglas (a grandson of the 17th Earl of Morton) in 1889. They had 5 children:
  - Margaret Laura Douglas (d. 1933)
  - Katharine Charlotte Douglas (1898–1982), who married Henry Walter Houldsworth in 1921.
  - Brig. Archibald Sholto George Douglas (1896–1981)
  - David Sholto William Douglas (b. 1899)
  - Lt.-Col. John Sholto Henry Douglas (1903–1960)
- Lady Mabel Florence Harriett Wentworth-Fitzwilliam (1870–1951), who married Lt.-Col. William Mackenzie Smith in 1899.
- William Charles de Meuron Wentworth-Fitzwilliam, 7th Earl Fitzwilliam (1872–1943) married Lady Maud Dundas, daughter of 1st Marquess of Zetland (d.1967)
- Lady Theresa Evelyn Vilunza Wentworth-Fitzwilliam (1875–1963), who married Lt.-Col. Alan Francis Fletcher in 1908. They had 2 children:
  - Violet Myrtle Fletcher (b. 1909)
  - Crystal Fletcher (b. 1920)

Viscount Milton died on 18 January 1877, aged 37, predeceasing his father. Their son succeeded as Earl FitzWilliam in 1902 and on 17 June 1904, the daughters of Lord Milton were granted, by Royal Warrant of Precedence, the rank and precedence of daughters of an earl. His widow died on 30 March 1886 at Wentworth Woodhouse.

== See also ==
- Dr Walter Butler Cheadle
- Wood Hall (Callaghan, Virginia), owned by Viscount Milton
- Mount Fitzwilliam, a mountain at Yellowhead Pass

== Notes ==
Parliament of the United Kingdom
New constituency	Member of Parliament for the West Riding of Yorkshire South; 1865–1872; With: Henry Beaumont	Succeeded by Henry Beaumont; Walter Spencer-Stanhope
