= Proby =

Proby may refer to:

== Surname ==
- Baptist Proby (1726–1807), Anglican Dean of Lichfield
- Bryan Proby (born 1971), American former National Football League player
- Douglas Proby (1856–1931), British politician and soldier
- Charles Proby (1771–1859), Anglican Canon of Windsor
- Glenda Proby (born 1987), stage name Gizzle, American rapper and songwriter
- Granville Proby, 3rd Earl of Carysfort (1782–1868), British Royal Navy admiral and politician
- Granville Proby, 4th Earl of Carysfort (1824–1872), British politician
- Hugh Proby (1826–1852), founder of Kanyaka Station in South Australia; son of the 3rd Earl of Carysfort
- John Proby (disambiguation)
- P.J. Proby (born James Marcus Smith, 1938), American singer, songwriter and actor
- Peter Proby, 2nd Baronet (1911–2002), bursar of Eton
- Sir Richard Proby, 1st Baronet (1886-1972)
- Thomas Proby, 1st Baronet (1632–1689), English politician and Member of Parliament
- Vince Proby (1928–1987), American architect
- William Proby, Lord Proby (1779–1804), British Royal Navy captain and politician
- William Proby, 5th Earl of Carysfort (1836–1909)

== Given name ==
- Proby Cautley (1802–1871), English engineer and palaeontologist
- Proby, a character from the movie Ruby, played by Richard C. Sarafian

== See also ==
- Probie (disambiguation)
