= Sir Richard Proby, 1st Baronet =

British landowner and former chairman of the Conservative Party (1886-1979)

Sir Richard Proby MC JP DL
- 1st Baronet
- Coat of arms
- Tenure: 1952-1979
- Predecessor: none
- Successor: Sir Peter Proby, 2nd Baronet
- Full name: Richard George Proby
- Born: 21 July 1886; London
- Died: 15 January 1979 (aged 92); Elton, Cambridgeshire
- Residence: Elton Hall
- Locality: Huntingdonshire
- Noble family: Proby; Carysfort; Abercorn; Donoughmore
- Spouses: Betty Monica Murray (m. 1911; died 1967); Eileen Yvonne, née Helps (m. 1972)
- Issue: 6 children, including Peter and Patience
- Father: Douglas Proby
- Mother: Lady Margaret Hely-Hutchinson

President of the National Union of Conservative and Unionist Associations
- In office 1958
- Preceded by: Frederick Marquis, 1st Earl of Woolton
- Succeeded by: Henry Brooke MP

Chairman of the National Union of Conservative and Unionist Associations
- In office 1946
- Preceded by: Rab Butler
- Succeeded by: Hon. Mrs Henry Hornyold-Strickland

Personal details
- Party: Conservative and Unionist Party
- Education: Eton College
- Alma mater: Royal Military Academy, Woolwich

Military service
- Allegiance: United Kingdom
- Branch/service: British Army
- Rank: Captain (1913); Major (1919)
- Unit: Royal Field Artillery (1906-1910)
- Commands: Essex Yeomanry
- Battles/wars: World War I; Battle of Loos (1915); Battle of Arras (1917)
- Awards: Military Cross (1918)

Sir Richard George Proby, 1st Baronet MC JP DL (21 July 1886 – 15 January 1979) was a British landowner, known for being the President of the Country Landowners Association and the Conservative Party (UK). He was created a Baronet in 1952.

== Early life and ancestry ==
Richard George Proby, also known as "Dick Proby", was born on 21 July 1886 in the Belgravia district of London. His father was the Conservative politician Colonel Douglas James Proby (1856-1931), who had been born Douglas James Hamilton but changed his surname to Proby by royal license in 1904. His mother was Lady Margaret Frances Hely-Hutchinson, daughter of the 4th Earl of Donoughmore. Colonel Douglas inherited the Proby estate, including Elton Hall, from his maternal uncle, William Proby, 5th Earl of Carysfort, who had died childless. The colonel also descended from the Earldom of Abercorn through his father, Lord Claud Hamilton (1813-1884), a grandson of John Hamilton, 1st Marquess and 7th Earl of Abercorn.

Ancestry of Sir Richard Proby, 1st Baronet

John Hamilton, 1st Marquess of Abercorn
James Hamilton, Viscount Hamilton
Catherine Copley
Lord Claud Hamilton (1813–1884)
Harriet Douglas
Sir Douglas James Proby, née Hamilton
Granville Proby, 3rd Earl of Carysfort
Lady Elizabeth Emma Proby
Isabella Howard
Sir Richard George Proby, 1st Baronet
John Hely-Hutchinson, 3rd Earl of Donoughmore
Richard Hely-Hutchinson, 4th Earl of Donoughmore
Margaret Gardiner
Lady Margaret Frances Hely-Hutchinson
Thomasina Jocelyn Steele

Proby had two elder brothers, Granville (1883-1947) and Claud Richard (1885-1901), a younger sister, Betty Alice Adeline (1889-1978), and a younger brother, Jocelyn Patrick (1900-1993). All four of Colonel Douglas's sons except for Claud Richard were educated at Eton College.

== Military service ==
Proby attended Royal Military Academy, Woolwich and became a Lieutenant in the Royal Field Artillery from 1906 to 1910. He was made captain in the Essex Yeomanry in 1913 and served with this unit during World War I. During the war, he was commended for his bravery in the capture of Monchy-le-Preux in the Battle of Arras (1917). He was "invalided" and sent home in May 1917. After the war, Proby was awarded the Military Cross in the 1918 New Year Honours and promoted to Major in 1919. He officially retired from the armed force on 4 December 1937.

== Political career and public offices ==
Proby was a member of the Conservative and Unionist Party. He stood as the party's candidate in the 1918 United Kingdom general election, contesting the seat of Sudbury in Suffolk. Despite receiving the Coalition Coupon, he came second with 5,746 votes, losing to the Liberal Party's Stephen Howard. He held leadership positions within the national party, notably as chairman of the executive committee from 1943 to 1946, as well as chairman and president of the National Union of Conservative and Unionist Associations in 1946 and 1958, respectively.

A farmer by trade, Proby was also known for his work in agriculture. In 1918, he was private secretary to Lord Ailwyn, who chaired the Agricultural Wages Board. During the Second World War, he chaired Huntingdonshire's War agricultural executive committee in 1939 and worked as Liaison Officer to the Ministry of Agriculture from 1941 to 1944. He reprised the latter after the war, from 1952 to 1955. Proby also presided over the Country Landowners Association from 1947 to 1951 and the Royal Forestry Society from 1956 to 1958.

Proby was created a baronet in the 1952 New Year Honours for his "political and public services". The family's seat is Elton Hall in Elton, Cambridgeshire. He had inherited this estate after his elder brother Granville's death in 1947.

Proby was appointed Deputy Lieutenant of Huntingdonshire in 1952 and Sheriff of Cambridgeshire and Huntingdonshire the following year.

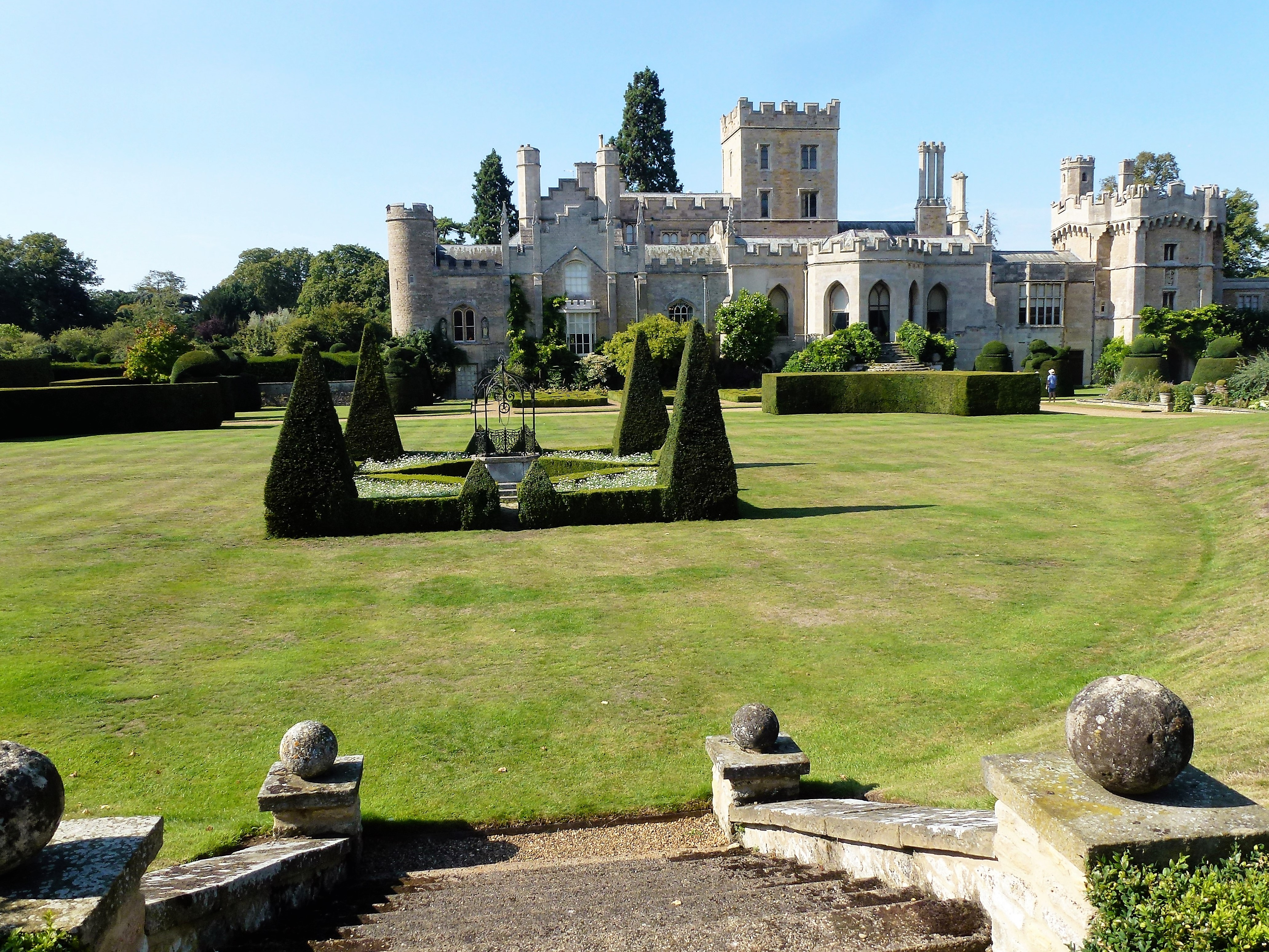
Elton Hall, the Proby Baronetcy's country estate in Cambridgeshire.

== Marriage and children ==
Proby's first marriage was to Betty Monica Murray, daughter of Alexander Henry Hallam Murray and granddaughter of John Murray III. They wedded on 7 February 1911 and had six children, the youngest of which were twins:

1. Eldest son Peter (1911-2002), who attended Trinity College, Oxford and served as a captain in the Irish Guards during World War II. He married Blanche Harrison Cripps, with whom he had 5 children, including William, the 3rd Baronet.
2. Eldest daughter Mary (1913-1982), who married William Fletcher-Vane, 1st Baron Inglewood. Their sons are the politician Richard, the 2nd Baron Inglewood and the barrister Christopher.
3. Son Claud (1917-1987), who attended Magdalene College, Cambridge and also served as a captain in the Irish Guards during World War II. He married Patricia Amelia Pearce, with whom he had 4 children.
4. Daughter Margaret (1920-2004), who married Jack Harry Harrison Cripps, with whom she had four children.
5. Son Richard (1923-1958), who attended Trinity College, Oxford and served as a sub-lieutenant in the Royal Navy Volunteer Reserve during World War II. He died, unmarried, in 1958 in a motor accident.
6. Daughter Patience (1923-2017), a medical doctor who trained at Lady Margaret Hall, Oxford and St George's, University of London. She married the British diplomat John Moberly and had three children.

Many letters that Proby wrote to Betty Monica during his service in World War I survived and provided glimpses into the frontline of the conflict. Following the death of his first wife in 1967, he remarried, in 1972, to Eileen Yvonne, who had previously been widowed. They had no children and remained married until Proby's death in 1979. The Proby baronetcy was passed on to the eldest son, Peter Proby upon his death.

Party political offices
Preceded by Rab Butler	Chairman of the National Union of Conservative and Unionist Associations; 1946	Succeeded by Hon. Mrs Henry Hornyold-Strickland
Preceded by Frederick Marquis, 1st Earl of Woolton	President of the National Union of Conservative and Unionist Associations; 1958	Succeeded by Henry Brooke MP
Baronetage of the United Kingdom
New title	Baronet (of Elton Hall); 1952–1979	Succeeded by Peter Proby
