= Patience Moberly =

British doctor (1923–2017)

Lady Patience Moberly MRCP
- Born: Patience Proby; 27 July 1923; Elton Hall, Elton, Cambridgeshire
- Died: 6 September 2017 (aged 94); Caversham, Reading
- Education: Lady Margaret Hall, Oxford; St George's, University of London
- Organisation: Medical Aid for Palestinians
- Spouse: Sir John Moberly (m. 1959; died 2004)
- Children: 3
- Parents: Sir Richard Proby, 1st Baronet (father); Betty Monica, née Murray (mother)
- Relatives: Sir Peter Proby, 2nd Baronet (brother); William Fletcher-Vane, 1st Baron Inglewood (brother-in-law)
- Family: Proby
- Medical career
- Profession: Medical doctor
- Field: Paediatrics
- Institutions: St George's Hospital; Hammersmith Hospital; Great Ormond Street Hospital

Lady Patience Moberly (née Proby) (27 July 1923 – 6 September 2017) was an English medical doctor, known for being part of the first cohort of women to train at St George's, University of London and for her work with the charity Medical Aid for Palestinians.

== Early life and family ==
Moberly was born on 27 July 1923 to Sir Richard George Proby and his first wife, Betty Monica (née Murray). She and her twin brother, Richard Proby, were their parents' youngest of 6 children (3 daughters and 3 sons). Sir Richard Proby was created the 1st Baronet of Elton Hall in 1952. Sir Peter Proby, 2nd Baronet was her eldest brother, and the current Baronet, Sir William Henry Proby, is her nephew. Moberly's eldest sister Mary was married to William Fletcher-Vane, 1st Baron Inglewood, making her an aunt to Richard Fletcher-Vane, 2nd Baron Inglewood and his brother Christopher.

Moberly was brought up at Elton Hall in Elton, Cambridgeshire. She was privately educated at The Perse School for Girls.

== Medical career ==
Moberly matriculated in 1942 at Lady Margaret Hall, Oxford to study Medicine, followed by postgraduate medical training at St George's, University of London from 1945. She was one of the first women to train at St George's. She earned her BM BCh as well as her practice license from the Royal College of Physicians in 1950. She worked as a paediatrician at various British hospitals, notably Hammersmith Hospital and Great Ormond Street Hospital. She also worked abroad in Canada and the United States.

== Later career and charitable work ==
In 1959, the former Patience Proby married the British diplomat John Moberly (later, Sir John Moberly), who was the British Ambassador to Jordan and Iraq. Patience Moberly accompanied her husband across his postings, notably in the Middle East towards the end of his career. She practiced medicine wherever she could, working at a local hospital in Baghdad during her husband's tenure in Iraq.

Sir John and Lady Moberly helped set up the first intensive care unit in Gaza and were among the co-founding members of the charity Medical Aid for Palestinians. Lady Moberly led the charity's various programmes in the 1990s, organising training opportunities for Palestinian healthcare professionals. She used her connections and influence in the medical field to get her colleagues onboard to train and treat Palestinians in Gaza as well as those displaced in refugee camps in Lebanon. According to Dr Ang Swee Chai, also a cofounder of the charity, Moberly would always ensure that her charitable work was sustainable and had long-lasting impact: "If you just treat the disease, it is only half the job. If you also train you are able to help them to treat their people long after you are gone".

Moberly later wrote about her staunch support for Palestinian people in her memoir, Glimpses of the Middle East, published by Scotland Street Press in 2015. Proceeds from the book were donated to Medical Aid for Palestinians.

== Personal life and death ==
Lady Moberly and Sir John had 3 children: sons Richard John (born in 1962) and Nicholas Hamilton (born in 1963), followed by daughter Clare Elizabeth (born in 1967). Sir John Moberly died in 2004.

Moberly had a life long friendship with Margaret Turner-Warwick, a fellow medical student at Lady Margaret Hall in the year below Moberly's. She was godmother to Turner-Warwick's daughter Gillian.

Lady Moberly died on 6 September 2017, aged 94. She was survived by her children.
