= William Proby =

William Proby may refer to:

- Sir William Henry Proby (born 1949), former chair of the National Trust and the National Portrait Gallery
- William Proby, 5th Earl of Carysfort (1836–1909), British peer
- William Proby, Lord Proby (1779–1804), British Royal Navy captain and politician
- William Proby (died 1739), father of English politician John Proby
