= Peter Proby =

British baronet (1911–2002)

Sir Peter Proby KStJ DL
- 2nd Baronet
- Tenure: 1979–2002
- Predecessor: Sir Richard Proby
- Successor: Sir William Henry Proby
- Born: 4 December 1911; Suffolk, England
- Died: 18 April 2002 (aged 90); Elton Hall
- Spouse: Blanche Harrison (m. 1944)
- Issue: 5

Lord Lieutenant of Cambridgeshire
- In office 1981–1985
- Preceded by: Peter Esmé Brassey
- Succeeded by: Michael Guy Bevan

Personal details
- Relatives: Patience Moberly (sister)
- Education: Eton College
- Alma mater: Trinity College, Oxford

Military service
- Allegiance: United Kingdom
- Branch/service: British Army
- Rank: Captain
- Unit: Irish Guards
- Battles/wars: World War II

Sir Peter Proby, 2nd Baronet, KStJ DL (4 December 1911 – 18 April 2002) was an English landowner and bursar of Eton.

== Early life ==
Peter Proby was born in Suffolk on 4 December 1911, the eldest son of Sir Richard Proby and his first wife, Betty Monica Murray. He was raised on the 3,700-acre family estate, Elton Hall, near Oundle. Peter was educated at Eton College before reading Politics, Philosophy, and Economics at Trinity College, Oxford.

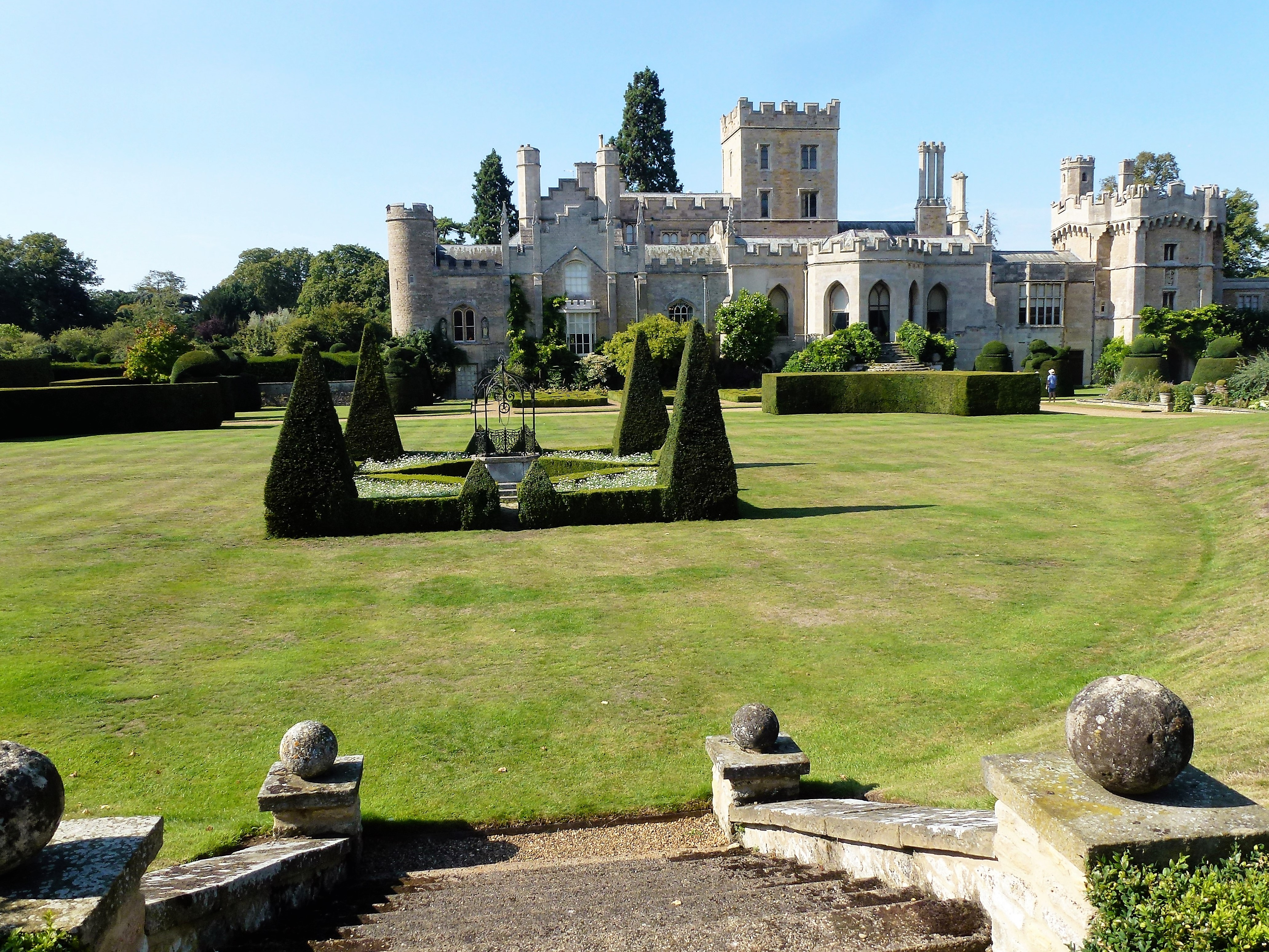
Elton Hall, the Proby Baronetcy's country estate in Cambridgeshire.

=== Ancestry ===
Sir Peter Proby descended from several families of peerage and landed gentry. His father, Sir Richard George Proby was created a Baronet in 1952. Sir Richard George Proby was a son of British politician Douglas James Proby (1856-1931), who was born Douglas James Hamilton but changed his surname to Proby by royal license in 1904. Douglas's father was the Conservative MP Lord Claud Hamilton (1813-1884) and his mother was Lady Elizabeth Emma Proby (d. 1900), daughter of Granville Proby, 3rd Earl of Carysfort (1782-1858). Lady Proby's brother William Proby, 5th Earl of Carysfort died without an heir in 1909, and thus all his titles became extinct, with the Proby estate Elton Hall inherited by his nephew, Douglas James Proby. Lord Claud Hamilton himself descended from the Earldom of Abercorn, his father being James Hamilton, Viscount Hamilton and his grandfather John Hamilton, 1st Marquess of Abercorn.

On his mother's side, Peter Proby was a great grandson of the Scottish publisher John Murray III through his younger son Alexander Henry Hallam (known as Hallam). Hallam Murray was the father of Betty Monica Murray and was thus Peter Proby's maternal grandfather.

Ancestry of Sir Peter Proby, 2nd Baronet

James Hamilton, Viscount Hamilton
Lord Claud Hamilton (1813–1884)
Harriet Douglas
Sir Douglas James Proby, née Hamilton
Granville Proby, 3rd Earl of Carysfort
Lady Elizabeth Emma Proby
Isabella Howard
Sir Richard George Proby, 1st Baronet
John Hely-Hutchinson, 3rd Earl of Donoughmore
Richard Hely-Hutchinson, 4th Earl of Donoughmore
Margaret Gardiner
Lady Margaret Frances Hely-Hutchinson
Thomasina Jocelyn Steele
Sir Peter Proby, 2nd Baronet
John Murray II
John Murray III
Anne Elliot
Alexander Henry Hallam Murray
Marion Smith
Betty Monica Murray
Alicia Maria Du Cane

== Career ==
After graduating from Oxford, he worked for the China trading firm of Jardine Matheson for four years, traveling between company posts on the Yangtze, leaving China in 1938. He enlisted in the Irish Guards upon the outbreak of World War II, spending most of his career in military intelligence interpreting aerial photographs and interrogating captured German airmen.

After the war, Proby qualified as a land agent, and then managed the family estate. In 1953, Proby was offered the bursarship of Eton. During his tenure there, several new buildings were erected, including Villiers and Farrer houses, and the college chapel was renovated after an infestation of death watch beetle. Proby was noted for his skilled financial management of these projects, and for his enthusiasm for new technology. After retiring from the bursarship in 1971, he returned to the management of Elton and engaged in local affairs.

Proby inherited his father's baronetcy in 1979, and in 1981, after a year as a deputy lieutenant, was appointed Lord Lieutenant of Cambridgeshire. He left that office in 1985.

Proby was appointed Knight of the Order of St John of Jerusalem by Queen Elizabeth II in 1983.

== Personal life ==
On 15 January 1944, he married Blanche Harrison Cripps, daughter of Colonel Henry Harrison Cripps. Together, they were the parents of five children, with their youngest being twins:

- Sarah Blanche Proby (b. 1945). She married Peter George Mills in 1968.
- John Granville Proby (1946–1971). He died in December 1971 in Penang, Malaysia, having gone missing after travelling there from Singapore.
- Sir William Proby, 3rd Baronet (b. 1949). He married Meredyth Anne Brentnall in 1974.
- Charlotte Mary Proby (b. 1957), who married Stephen John Hay in 1984.
- Christine Elisabeth Proby (b. 1957), who married Christopher Dobbs in 1983.

Sir Peter Proby died on 18 April 2002. His estate's net worth was £381,718 at the time of his death.

Honorary titles
Preceded by Peter Esmé Brassey	Lord Lieutenant of Cambridgeshire; 1981–1985	Succeeded by Michael Guy Bevan
Baronetage of the United Kingdom
Preceded by Richard Proby	Baronet (of Elton Hall); 1979–2002	Succeeded by William Proby
