= Proby baronets =

Baronetcy in the Baronetage of the United Kingdom

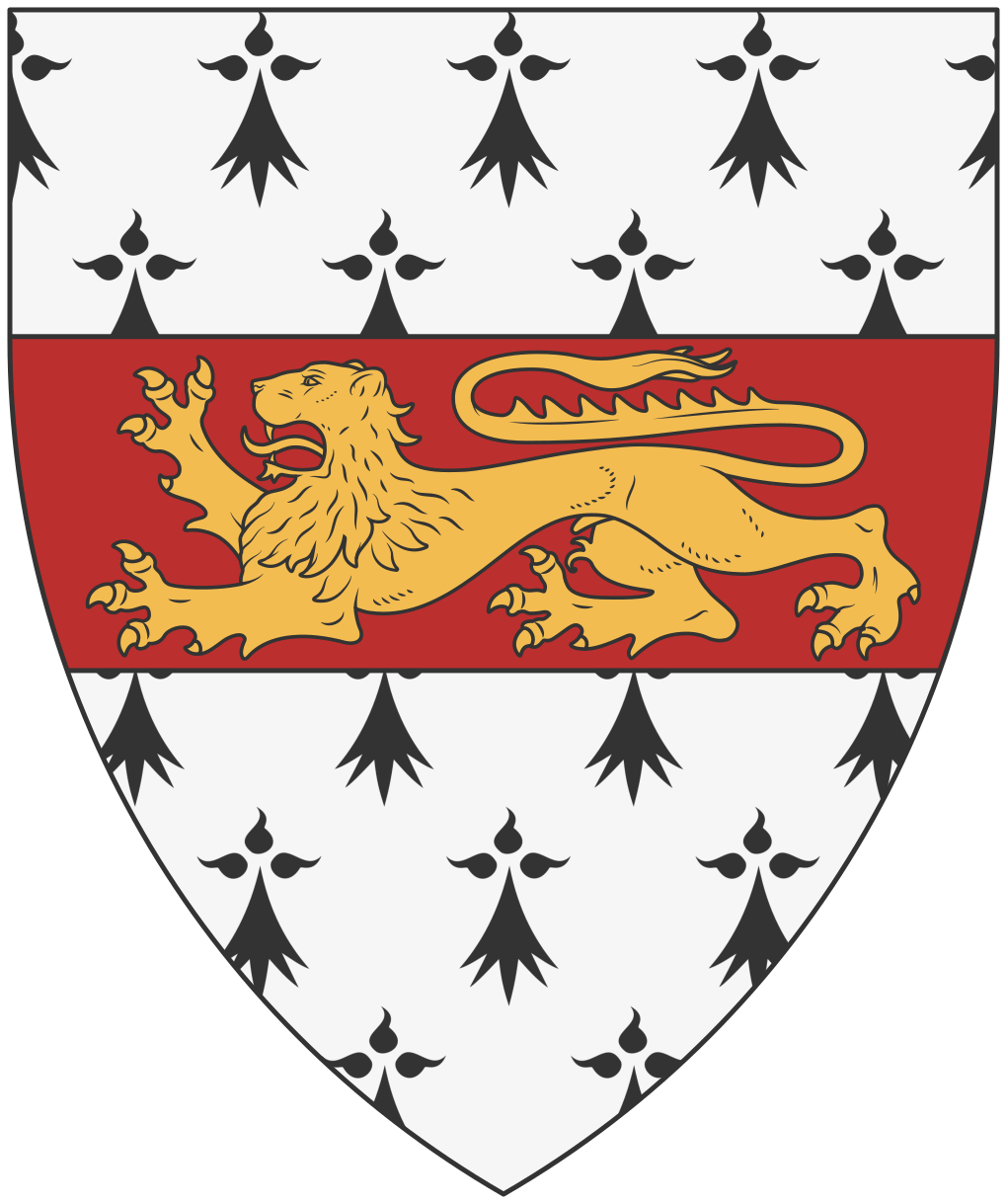
Arms of Proby of Elton

There have been two baronetcies created for persons with the surname Proby, one in the Baronetage of England and one in the Baronetage of the United Kingdom. The first creation is extinct while the second creation is extant.

The Proby Baronetcy, of Elton in the County of Huntingdon, was created in the Baronetage of England on 7 March 1662 for Thomas Proby. He represented Amersham and Huntingdonshire in the House of Commons. The title became extinct on his death in 1689. Proby's first cousin William Proby was the ancestor of the Earls of Carysfort.

The Proby Baronetcy, of Elton Hall in the County of Huntingdon, was created in the Baronetage of the United Kingdom on 30 January 1952 for Major Richard Proby, President of the Country Landowners' Association. He was the son of Colonel Douglas Hamilton, who assumed by Royal licence the surname of Proby in 1904, son of Lord Claud Hamilton and his wife Lady Elizabeth Emma Proby, daughter of Granville Leveson Proby, 3rd Earl of Carysfort, and sister of William Proby, 5th Earl of Carysfort (on whose death in 1909 the earldom became extinct). Lord Claud Hamilton was the second son of James Hamilton, Viscount Hamilton, eldest son of John Hamilton, 1st Marquess of Abercorn. Consequently, the present holder of the Proby Baronetcy of Elton Hall is also in remainder to the marquessate of Abercorn and its subsidiary titles, titles held by his kinsman the Duke of Abercorn.

== Proby baronets, of Elton (1662) ==
- Sir Thomas Proby, 1st Baronet (c. 1634–1689)

== Proby baronets, of Elton Hall (1952) ==
- Sir Richard George Proby, 1st Baronet (1886–1979)
- Sir Peter Proby, 2nd Baronet (1911–2002)
- Sir William Henry Proby, CBE, 3rd Baronet (born 1949)

There is no heir to the baronetcy.

== See also ==
- Duke of Abercorn
- Earl of Carysfort
