= Probie =

Probie may refer to:

- Abbreviation of probationary
- Probe / Men in Video Awards, also called "The Probies"
- Probie, a nickname for fictional NCIS character Timothy McGee

== See also ==
- Proby, a list of people and fictional characters with the surname or given name
- Proby baronets, two titles
