= French brig Colombe =

Colombe
History

France
- Name: Colombe
- Namesake: the dove
- Builder: Cherbourg Dockyard (Constructeurs: Ozanne and Louis-Jacques Normand)
- Laid down: June 1794 (or 1 November 1794)
- Launched: 18 May 1795 (or 27 September 1795)
- Captured: 18 June 1803

United Kingdom
- Name: HMS Colombe
- Acquired: 1803 by capture
- Fate: Broken up 1811

General characteristics
- Displacement: 400 tons (French)
- Tons burthen: 4032/94 (bm)
- Length: 108 ft 2 in (33.0 m) (overall); 897 ft 10 in (273.7 m) (keel)
- Beam: 29 ft 0 1/2 in (8.9 m)
- Depth of hold: 8 ft 1 in (2.5 m)
- Complement: French service:136; British service:96
- Armament: French service: Designed for 6 × 24-pounder, then 12 × 18-pounder, and completed with 12 × 12-pounder guns; British service: 14 × 32-pounder carronades + 2 × 6-pounder bow chase guns

The French brig Colombe was launched in 1795 for the French Navy. She had a minor role in the mutiny on HMS Danae. The British captured her in 1803. She never served on active duty in the Royal Navy but instead was immediately laid-up. She was broken up in 1811.

== Design ==
Colombe had been built as a one-off to plans by Pierre-Alexandre-Laurent Forfait that Pierre Ozanne had modified. She had two masts and was flat-bottomed. Contemporary records suggest that her design was appropriate for vessels intended to guard river openings. Colombe may have been a smaller version of the contemporary Etna-class corvettes.

== French service and capture ==
HMS Danae: On 14 March 1800 mutineers took control of Danae. The following morning Danae reached Le Conquet in Finistère, where they met up with Colombe, which Danae had herself chased into the port. Danae and Colombe then sailed together to Brest. On the way the frigates Anson and Boadicea chased them briefly before breaking off after the mutineers falsely signaled that they were in pursuit of Colombe. The French treated Captain Lord William Proby, his officers, and the loyal seamen well, and then paroled them. French records state that Colombe, under the command of capitaine de frégate Julien, encountered Danae at Pointe Saint-Mathieu.

Capture: On 18 June 1803, Dragon and Endymion captured Colombe. Colombe was copper-bottomed and pierced for 16 guns. She had a crew of 65 men under the command of lieutenant de vaisseau Caro. Colombe had been returning from Martinique and was bound for Brest when the British captured her off Ouessant.

Colombe was effectively unarmed when captured. By one contemporary account, her cannons were in the hold. Later, Admiralty records indicated that she had left her 12-pounder guns in Martinique.

When she arrived at Plymouth, Colombe reported that she was the forerunner of a French fleet from Martinique consisting of a Seventy-four, two frigates, and 60 merchant vessels. Dragon communicated this intelligence to the Channel fleet, which dispersed to attempt to intercept what they could.

== Fate ==
Colombe arrived at Plymouth on 6 July. Royal Navy nominally took her into service as HMS Colombe, but never fitted or commissioned her.

The Principal Officers and Commissioners of His Majesty's Navy offered the sloop Colombe, lying at Plymouth, for sale on 18 October 1810. Despite her sale being advertised several times, she apparently did not sell. She was docked at Plymouth on 2 July 1811 for breaking up.
