= Over End =

Over End may refer to:

- Over End, Cambridgeshire
- Over End, Derbyshire
