= Thomas Proby =

English politician

Sir Thomas Proby, 1st Baronet
- In office 1660–1679 Serving with Charles Cheyne and Sir William Drake, 1st Baronet
- Constituency: Amersham
- In office 1679–1685 Serving with Silius Titus
- Constituency: Huntingdonshire

Personal details
- Born: Thomas Proby; 18 October 1632
- Died: 22 April 1689 (aged 56)
- Spouse: Frances Cotton (m. 1662)
- Education: Emmanuel College, Cambridge; Middle Temple

Sir Thomas Proby, 1st Baronet (18 October 1632 – 22 April 1689) of Elton Hall, Huntingdonshire (now Cambridgeshire) was an English politician who sat in the House of Commons between 1660 and 1685.

== Early life and ancestry ==
Thomas Proby was the son of Sir Heneage Proby (of Elton and Raans, Buckinghamshire) and his wife Ellen Allen, daughter of Edward Allen, of Finchley, Middlesex. His paternal grandfather was the politician Sir Peter Proby, who had been a Member of Parliament (MP) Kingston upon Hull and Liverpool, as well as Lord Mayor of London.

Proby matriculated at Emmanuel College, Cambridge in 1648 before receiving legal training at Middle Temple. He was called to the bar in 1658.

== Political career ==
In 1660, Proby was elected Member of Parliament for Amersham in the Convention Parliament. He was re-elected MP for Amersham in the Cavalier Parliament and sat until 1679. In 1679 he was elected MP for Huntingdonshire and sat until 1685.

Proby was created a baronet in 1662.

== Personal life and death ==
Proby married Frances Cotton, daughter of Sir Thomas Cotton, 2nd Baronet of Connington, Huntingdonshire. They had 6 children, of whom 4 survived to adulthood:

1. Son Thomas, who died unmarried on his travel in 1684;
2. Daughter Alice, born in 1673, who married the Hon. Thomas Watson-Wentworth MP, and had an only child, Thomas Watson-Wentworth, 1st Marquess of Rockingham;
3. Daughters Frances and Elizabeth, both of whom died unmarried.

Their daughter Ellen died in 1670 and son Heneage died in 1671.

Proby bought the Elton Hall estate following his marriage to Frances. Initially finding the estate in ruinous conditions, Proby went on to rebuild the manor completely around 1663 to 1666.

Proby died on 22 April 1689 at the age of 56, and his baronetcy became extinct. Elton Hall was under the ownership of Proby's widow until her death in 1699 before passing on to his brother, John Proby.

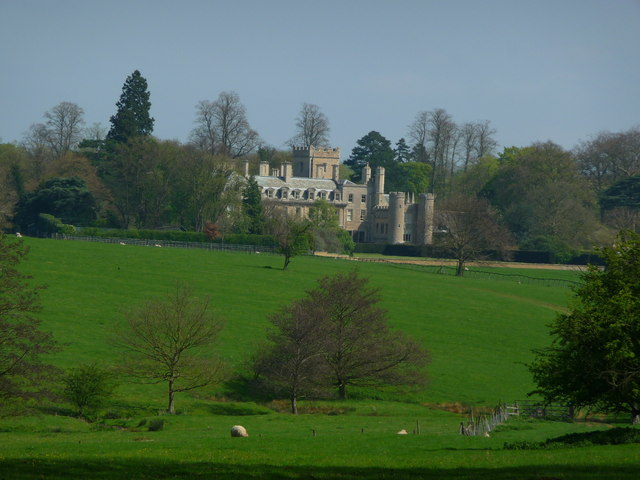
Elton Hall, Cambridgeshire

Parliament of England
| Preceded by Not represented in Restored Rump | Member of Parliament for Amersham; 1660–1679; With: Charles Cheyne 1660; Sir William Drake, Bt 1661–1669; Sir William Drake 1669–1679 | Succeeded by Sir William Drake; Sir Roger Hill |
| Preceded by Hon. Ralph Montagu; Robert Apreece | Member of Parliament for Huntingdonshire; 1679–1685; With: Silius Titus | Succeeded by Sir John Cotton, Bt; Sir Lionel Walden |
Baronetage of England
| New creation | Baronet (of Elton); 1662–1689 | Extinct |
