= HMS Danae (1798) =

French naval ship (1796–1798)

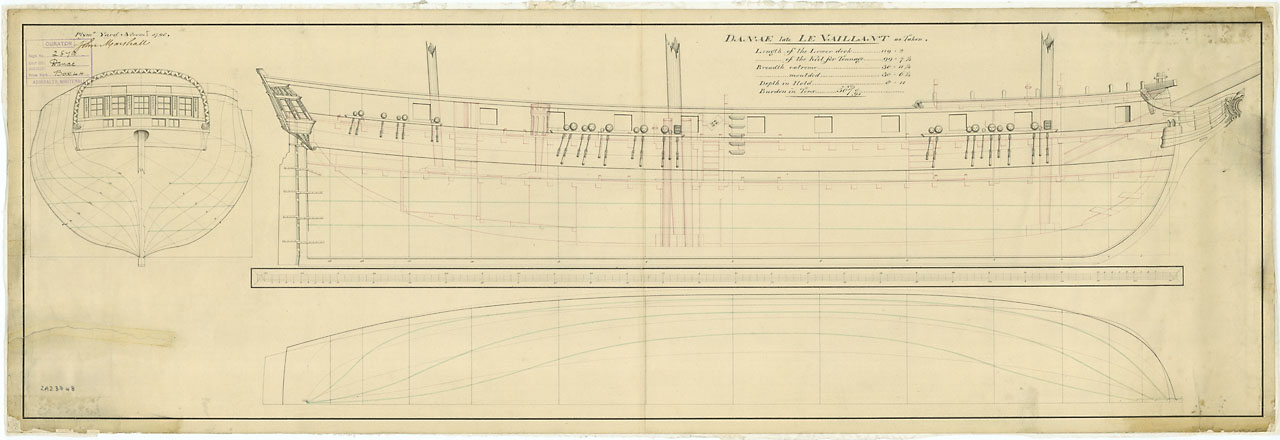
- Danae

History

France
- Name: Vaillante
- Launched: 1796
- Renamed: Danaé August 1798
- Captured: 7 August 1798

Great Britain
- Name: HMS Danae
- Acquired: By capture 7 August 1798
- Commissioned: December 1798
- Captured: By mutineers 14 March 1800

France
- Name: Vaillante
- Acquired: From mutineers 15 March 1800
- Fate: Sold out of service 1801

General characteristics
- Class & type: Bonne Citoyenne-class corvette
- Type: Ship-corvette in French service; Sixth-rate post ship in British service
- Tons burthen: 507 8/94 (bm)
- Length: 119 ft 2 in (36.3 m) (overall); 99 ft 7 1/4 in (30.4 m) (keel)
- Beam: 30 ft 11 1/4 in (9.4 m)
- Depth of hold: 8 ft 11 in (2.7 m)
- Sail plan: Full-rigged ship
- Complement: French service: 175; British service: 155
- Armament: French service: 20 × 8-pounder guns; British service: Upper deck: 20 × 32-pounder carronades; QD: 6 × 12-pounder carronades; Fc: 6 × 12-pounder carronades

Vaillante was a 20-gun French Bonne-Citoyenne-class corvette, built at Bayonne and launched in 1796. British naval Captain Edward Pellew in Indefatigable captured her off the Île de Ré on 7 August 1798. The Admiralty took her into the Royal Navy as the post ship HMS Danae. Some of her crew mutinied in 1800 and succeeded in turning her over to the French. The French returned her to her original name of Vaillante, and sold her in 1801. As a government-chartered transport she made one voyage to Haiti; her subsequent history is unknown at this time.

== French service ==
Vaillante was built at Bayonne between 1794 and August 1796, and was launched in 1796. She was armed with twenty long 8-pounders and 175 men, commanded by Lieutenant la Porte, and bound to Cayenne, carrying 25 banished priests, 27 convicts, and Madame Rovère and family. Indefatigable captured Vaillante off the Île de Ré on 7 August 1798. She arrived in Portsmouth on 20 October 1798, was registered and renamed Danae on 11 October 1798 and was fitted out until February 1799. James draws attention to the fact that the British equipped her with more cannons, but fewer men, than the French had.

== British service ==
Captain Lord William Proby commissioned Danae in December 1798. In March 1799 a gale caught her in a bay of shoals and rocks near the Île de Batz. Two of her anchor cables broke and her crew let go a third anchor, which held. The storm stove in all her boats and Proby slipped and fell down the main hatchway. The fall dislocated his shoulder and broke two ribs.

On 4 April 1799 Danae captured the 14-gun lugger Sans Quartier, off Chausey. Sans Quartier had a crew of 56 men and though she was pierced for 14 guns, she had thrown all overboard in an attempt to escape from Danae.

On 25 December 1799 Danae, Sylph and the hired armed cutter Nimrod assisted Ethalion, which had hit some rocks. They were able to rescue the crew and Ethalion was then burnt.

The next year, on 10 January 1800, Danae was in company with Excellent and Uranie when Excellent recaptured the American vessel Franklin, which a French privateer Alliance had taken the day before. Franklin had been sailing from St. Thomas for London with a cargo of sugar, coffee and indigo. The privateers had done a great deal of damage to the vessel and her cargo before the British recaptured her.

On 6 February 1800, Danae, with other vessels, captured the 42-gun frigate Pallas from Saint-Malo bound to Brest, off St Malo. The British took Pallas into service as Pique. That morning Danae also captured a French cutter.

One month later, on 6 March, Danae sailed from Plymouth on a cruise to the westward. Then on 10 March Danae recaptured the sloop Plenty. A French privateer had captured Plenty, Needs, master, as she sailed from Cork to Lisbon. Danae sent Plenty into Plymouth.

== Mutiny ==
At 9:30 in the evening of 14 March 1800 mutineers took control of Danae's deck while the officers were mostly below decks asleep. The captain of the foretop, William Jackson, attacked and threw the master, who was officer of the watch, down the main hatchway. The mutineers succeeded in securing the hatchways, preventing Proby, his officers, and the loyal seamen from coming up on deck. Proby and his officers tried to regain the deck but the mutineers drove them back and inflicted a head wound on Proby.

The following morning the mutineers reached Le Conquet in Finistère, where they met up with the French brig Colombe, which Danae had herself chased into the port. A detachment of soldiers came aboard and accepted Lord Proby's surrender. Danae and Colombe then sailed together to Brest. On the way the frigates Anson and Boadicea chased them briefly before breaking off after the mutineers falsely signaled that they were in pursuit of Colombe.

The French treated Captain Proby, his officers and the loyal seamen well, and then paroled them. A court martial aboard Gladiator on 17 June 1800 honourably acquitted Proby, his officers and the loyal members of the crew of blame.

== Fate ==
The French restored Danae to her original name. They sold Vaillante to a Morlaix merchant named Cooper in 1801. Cooper then chartered her back to the French government as a transport. She made a single voyage to Haiti during the Haitian Revolution of Toussaint Louverture. It is not known what happened to the ship after 1802.

== Post script ==
On 30 May 1800 Dasher left Plymouth on a cruise. She returned that same evening and landed two seamen, mutineers from Danae that Dasher had taken out of a cartel off the Sound. On 12 June Indefatigable captured the French privateer Vengeur, which had sailed from Bordeaux two days previously for Brazil. When her crew landed at Plymouth the authorities conveyed them to Mill prison. There, on 24 August, Lieutenant Neville Lake, who had been first lieutenant in Danae, identified John Barnet(t) as one of the mutiny's ringleaders. The court martial on 2 September sentenced Barnet to death; he was hanged from the fore-yard arm of Pique on 9 September. (Note: The identification of Lieutenant Lake as first lieutenant of Danae is inconsistent with the identification of Lieutenant Nevin as first lieutenant of Danae in a subsequent court martial of another mutineer.)

At the end of September the Guernsey privateers Alarm, Dispatch, and Marquis of Townsend recaptured a large West Indiaman that the French privateer Grand Mouche had captured and sent to Brest. The Guernseymen's prizemaster discovered that the French prize crew included seven mutineers from Danae.

Another mutineer, John M'Donald, alias Samuel Higgins, was seized in the streets of Wapping disguised as an American carrying American protection papers. His court martial took place aboard Irresistible, at the Nore on 10 June 1801. Lieutenant Nevins, who had been Danae's first lieutenant and who had apprehended M'Donald in London, testified that while he was in a tavern with M'Donald after apprehending him, M'Donald had said that the instigators of the plot to take Danae were two men named Jackson and Williams and an Irish priest (and former officer of the Irish rebel army) named Ignatius Finney. M'Donald was hanged on 20 June on Zealand, a guardship at the Nore. John Williams was tried in September, but was pardoned by King George III due to a technicality. It is not clear what, if anything, happened to William Jackson or Ignatius Finney.

== See also ==
- List of ships captured in the 19th century

== Notes ==
It was possible for HMS Danae to have had several First Lieutenants. Having taken a vessel as a prize ship, it was customary for the Captain to appoint an officer or warrant officer as Prize Master, who would then command the captured ship to a friendly port. Sometimes this resulted in permanent promotion, othertimes a command at the same rank, or just being returned to their own ship. Should the First Lieutenant be promoted/appointed Prize Master, the next in line would become First Lieutenant.
