= Michael Bevan (lord lieutenant) =

Michael Guy Molesworth Bevan (23 August 1926 – 2 March 1992) was Lord Lieutenant of Cambridgeshire from 1985 to 1992.

The son of Temple Percy Molesworth Bevan, M.C. and grandson of Henry Edward James Bevan, Bevan was educated at Eton College and served in the Grenadier Guards from 1944 to 1947. In 1948 he married Mary Brocklebank: they had three sons and one daughter.

Honorary titles
Preceded by Sir Peter Proby, 2nd Baronet	Lord Lieutenant of Cambridgeshire; 1985–1992	Succeeded by James Gee Pascoe Crowden
