= Earl of Carysfort =

Title in the Peerage of Ireland

Arms of Proby: Ermine, on a fess gules a lion passant or

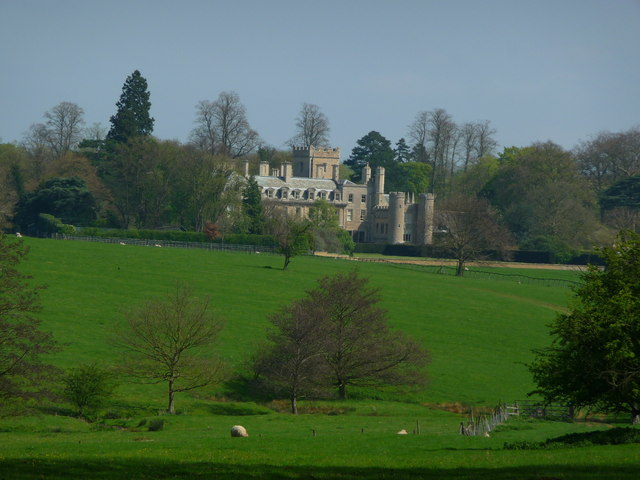
Elton Hall

Earl of Carysfort was a title in the Peerage of Ireland. It was created in 1789 for John Proby, 2nd Baron Carysfort. The Proby family descended from Sir Peter Proby, Lord Mayor of London in 1622. His great-great-grandson John Proby represented Huntingdonshire and Stamford in the House of Commons. His son and namesake John Proby was a Whig politician and notably served as a (civilian) Lord of the Admiralty. In 1752 he was raised to the Peerage of Ireland as Baron Carysfort, of Carysfort in the County of Wicklow. He was succeeded by his son, the second Baron. He was also a politician and was created Earl of Carysfort in the Peerage of Ireland in 1789. In 1801 he was further honoured when he was made Baron Carysfort, of the Hundred of Norman Cross in the County of Huntingdon, in the Peerage of the United Kingdom, which gave him a seat in the British House of Lords. His eldest son and heir apparent, William Proby, Lord Proby, predeceased him.

Lord Carysfort was therefore succeeded by his second son, the second Earl. He was a general in the Army. He died unmarried and was succeeded in 1855 by his younger brother Granville Leveson Proby, the third Earl. He was a vice-admiral in the Royal Navy and finally became an admiral on 9 July 1857. On his death on 3 November 1868, the titles passed to his second but eldest surviving son, the fourth Earl. He was a Liberal politician and had served as Comptroller of the Household from 1859 to 1866. He died childless and was succeeded by his younger brother, the fifth Earl. He served as Lord-Lieutenant of County Wicklow from 1890 to 1909. He was also childless and on his death in 1909 all the titles became extinct.

Lady Elizabeth Emma Proby, daughter of the third Earl, married Lord Claud Hamilton, grandson of John Hamilton, 1st Marquess of Abercorn. Their son Colonel Douglas Hamilton inherited parts of the Proby estates, including Elton Hall in Huntingdonshire, and assumed by Royal licence the surname of Proby in lieu of Hamilton in 1904. His son Richard George Proby was created a Baronet, of Elton Hall in the County of Huntingdon, in 1952 (see Proby Baronets).

Hugh Proby, the third son of the third Earl, was the founder of Kanyaka Station in the Flinders Ranges of South Australia.

The heir apparent to the earldom used the invented courtesy title of Lord Proby.

== Barons Carysfort (1752) ==
- John Proby, 1st Baron Carysfort (1720–1772)
- John Joshua Proby, 2nd Baron Carysfort (1751–1828) (created Earl of Carysfort in 1789)

== Earls of Carysfort (1789) ==
- John Joshua Proby, 1st Earl of Carysfort (1751–1828)
  - William Allen Proby, Lord Proby (1779–1804)
- John Proby, 2nd Earl of Carysfort (1780–1855)
- Granville Leveson Proby, 3rd Earl of Carysfort (1782–1868)
  - John Joshua Proby, Lord Proby (1823–1858)
- Granville Leveson Proby, 4th Earl of Carysfort (1824–1872)
- William Proby, 5th Earl of Carysfort (1836–1909)
