= Sir William Henry Proby =

British baronet, former chairman of the National Trust

Sir William Henry Proby CBE DL
- 3rd Baronet
- Tenure: 2002–present
- Predecessor: Sir Peter Proby
- Known for: Presidency of the Historic Houses Association (1993-1998); Chairmanship of the National Trust (2003-2008) and the National Portrait Gallery (2012-2017)
- Born: 13 June 1949 (age 77)
- Residence: Elton Hall
- Locality: Elton, Cambridgeshire
- Spouse: Meredyth Anne Brentnall (m. 1974)
- Issue: 4 daughters
- Father: Peter Proby
- Mother: Blanche Harrison Cripps

High Sheriff of Cambridgeshire
- In office 2001–2002
- Preceded by: Antony Francis Pemberton
- Succeeded by: Jane Lewin Smith

Personal details
- Education: Eton College
- Alma mater: Lincoln College, Oxford; Brooksby College of Agriculture

Sir William Henry Proby, 3rd Baronet CBE DL (born 13 June 1949) is a British baronet who has served as President of the Historic Houses Association and as chairman of the National Trust and the National Portrait Gallery.

== Early life and education ==
Born on 13 June 1949, William Henry Proby is the third child and second son of Sir Peter Proby and Blanche Harrison (née Cripps). His paternal grandfather, Sir Richard Proby, was created the 1st Proby baronet in 1952.

Proby attended Eton College before reading Engineering and Economics at Lincoln College, Oxford, graduating with an upper-second class degree.

== Career ==
Proby began his career as a chartered accountant in the City of London. His previous workplaces included Price Waterhouse and Morgan, Grenfell & Co.

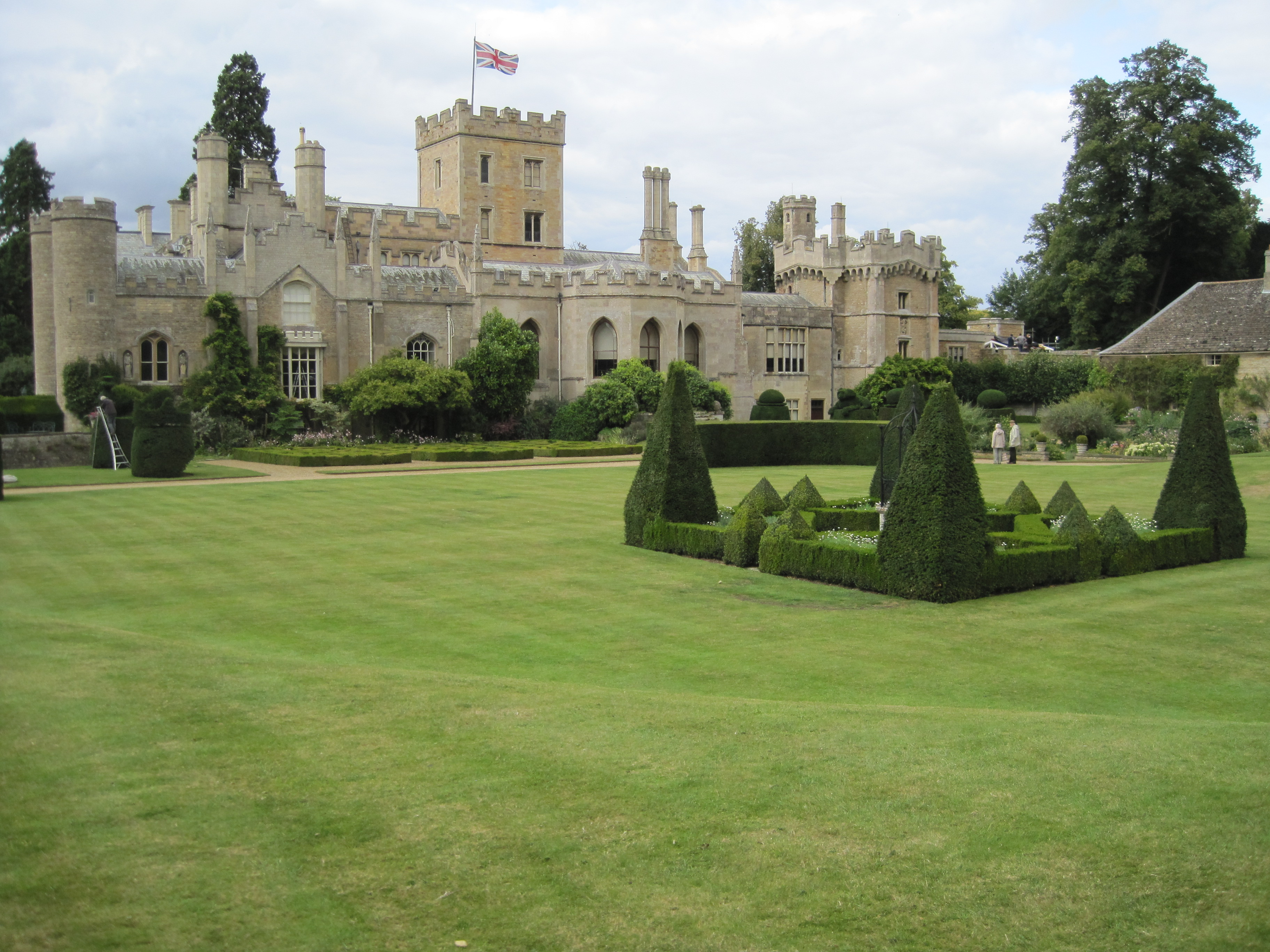
Sir William Proby and his family have managed Elton Hall since 1980.

Upon the death of his grandfather in 1979, his father declined to take on Elton Hall, the family estate. As his elder brother, John Granville Proby, had died in 1971, the property was passed on to William Henry Proby. He took a break from his financier career to study at the Brooksby College of Agriculture in preparation for managing the estate's 2000-acre farm.

Since his inheritance of Elton Hall, Proby has held several prominent positions within the conservation and heritage sector. Between 1994 and 1998, Proby served as president of the Historic Houses Association, having previously chaired the association's taxation and political committee as well as holding the office of deputy president. During his presidency, he called for financial supports for landowners, such as a reduced VAT for reparation and maintenance of listed building in light of rising upkeep costs, stressing the importance of Britain's built heritage and the benefits generated by visits from millions of tourists annually.

From 2003 to 2008, Proby was chairman of the National Trust. He took up this position at a turbulent time for the Trust, whose decision to ban stag hunting on its land in 1997 was seen by some as controversial. During his time at the National Trust, in 2006, Proby spoke out against penalising the use of Interest in possession trust, arguing that not all of such arrangement was set up as a way to avoid inheritance tax. In 2007, in a speech at the National Trust's annual general meeting (AGM), he expressed concerns over Gordon Brown's government's proposal to build three million homes by 2020, citing the risks of the loss of green belt land. His views drew criticism towards the trust for hypocrisy, in light of the organisation's plan to sell off land in the Erddig Estate (near Wrexham, North Wales) for housing development in 2007, as well as the previous sale of green belt land in Dorset. Shortly after AGM, the National Trust spent one million pounds to purchase 470 acres of fields by Divis and Black Mountain (near Belfast, Northern Ireland), which was then under threat of redevelopment. The land purchase was investigated by the Charity Commission for England and Wales for an alleged abuse of charitable status in partaking in a political debate over the green belt.

In June 2012, Proby succeeded Professor David Cannadine as chairman of the National Portrait Gallery, having previously been the organisation's deputy chair. He stepped down from this post in July 2017 and was succeeded by David Ross. Since December 2017, he has been chairman of the Howard de Walden Estate.

=== Views ===
In 2021, Proby delivered an address at the Historic Houses Association's AGM, which echoed his previous position in support of financial reliefs for private owners of country houses. In the same speech, he criticised the National Trust, the organisation he once chaired, for turning its back on country houses' owners in portraying "their houses as monuments to slavery, exploitation and inequality". This comment referenced the National Trust's 2020 report on its properties' histories of colonialism and historic slavery, which attracted criticism from right wing politicians and the Restore Trust pressure group, alongside support and praises from others for researching and contextualising challenging history of the properties.

In 2024, Proby penned an op-ed in The Telegraph to voice his criticism towards the lack of democracy in the governance of the National Trust, particularly in the introduction of the "quick vote" in 2022.

=== Honorary titles ===
Proby inherited the baronetcy upon his father's death in 2002. He served as Deputy Lieutenant of Cambridgeshire in 1995 and as the county's High Sheriff in 2001/02. He was appointed as Commander of the Order of the British Empire (CBE) in the 2009 Birthday Honours for services to conservation and heritage.

== Personal life ==
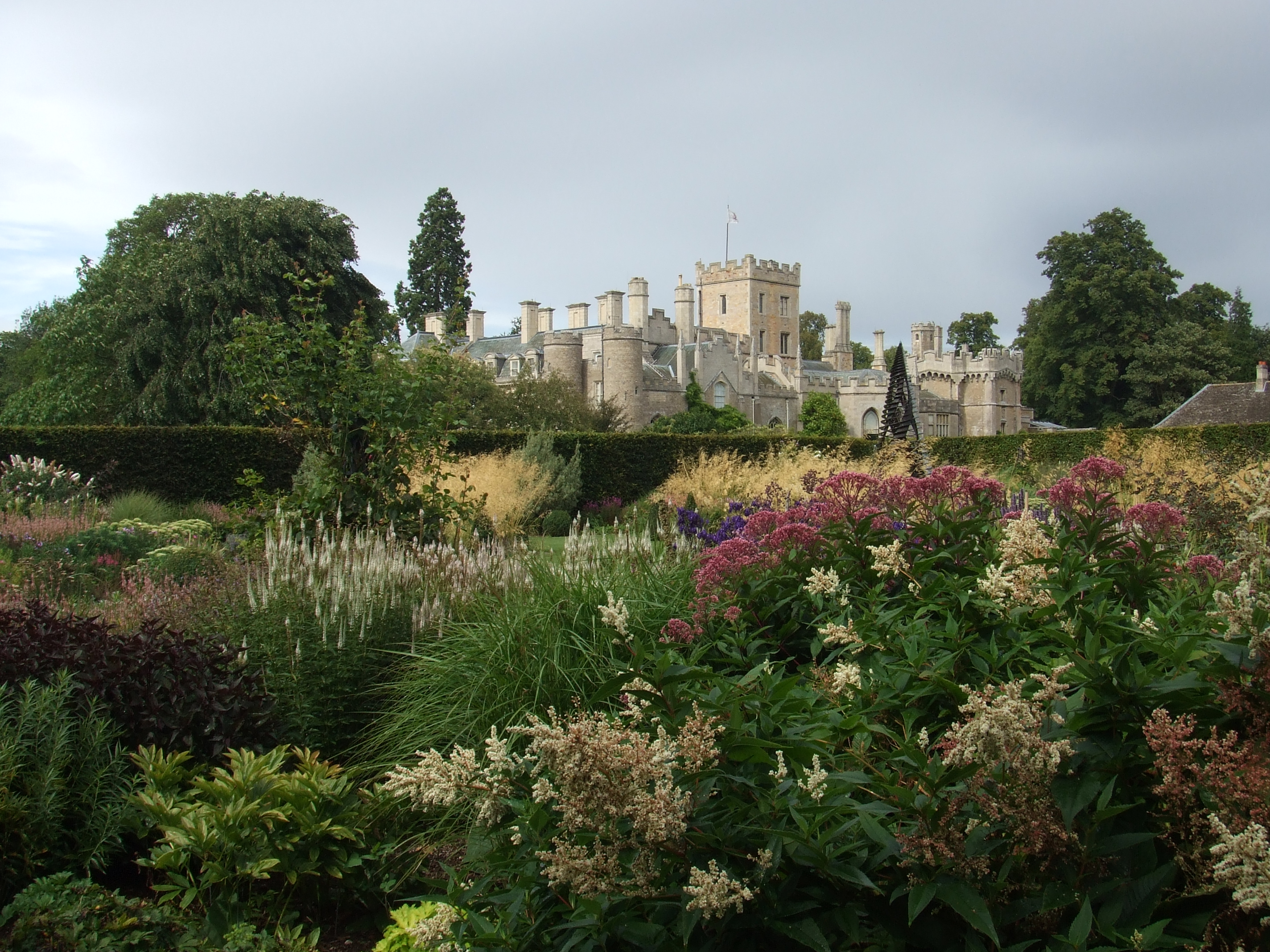
Elton Hall's Garden was renovated by Lady Meredyth Proby.

Proby has been married to his wife, Meredyth Anne (née Brentnall) since 1974. Together, they have four daughters, born between 1980 and 1991. Lady Proby is a syndic of Fitzwilliam Museum at University of Cambridge. She is credited with the transformation of Elton Hall's garden, which won the Judges’ Choice category in the Historic Houses Garden of the Year Award in 2021. Of the Proby daughters, Alexandra, the eldest, is married to film producer Rory Aitken, son of The 3rd Baron Beaverbrook.

A father of four daughters with no son, Proby was a signatory to an open letter published in The Telegraph in 2013 calling for hereditary titles to be passed down to female heirs. The letter endorsed the Equality (Titles) Bill sponsored by The Lord Lucas and Dingwall and MP Mary Macleod, which did not eventually progress past the Committee stage of the House of Lords.

== See also ==
- Historic Houses Association
- National Trust
- National Portrait Gallery, London

Honorary titles
| Preceded by Antony Francis Pemberton | High Sheriff of Cambridgeshire; 2001-2002 | Succeeded by Jane Lewin Smith |
Baronetage of the United Kingdom
| Preceded by Peter Proby | Baronet (of Elton Hall); 2002–present | Succeeded by ? |
Cultural offices
| Preceded by Charles Nunneley | Chairman of the National Trust; 2003-2008 | Succeeded by Simon Jenkins |
| Preceded by David Cannadine | Chairman of National Portrait Gallery; 2012-2017 | Succeeded by David Ross |
