= Henry Ashton (architect) =

English architect

Henry Ashton (1801–1872) was an English architect.

Ashton was born in London, and became a pupil of Sir Robert Smirke. Afterwards, and till death, he was employed by Sir Jeffrey Wyattville. He erected the stables at Windsor and the kennels at Frogmore. In 1838 he was employed by the King of the Netherlands to build the summer palace at the Hague. The project was cancelled and a couple of years later he worked on the new Gothic Hall of Kneuterdijk Palace.

He was the architect of the improvements in Victoria Street and designed the thoroughfare which connects Belgravia with the Houses of Parliament. Some of the best examples of his work are found in Victoria Street. He exhibited many designs at the academy.

He died in Kensington, London on 18 March 1872.
