= John Proby =

John Proby may refer to:

- John Proby (died 1710), MP for Huntingdonshire
- John Proby (died 1762), MP for Huntingdonshire and Stamford
- John Proby, 1st Baron Carysfort, British politician, son of the above
- John Joshua Proby, 1st Earl of Carysfort, British politician, son of the above
- John Proby, 2nd Earl of Carysfort, British soldier and politician, son of the above
