= Elton Hall =

Grade I listed country house in Cambridgeshire

- Near Elton, Cambridgeshire in England
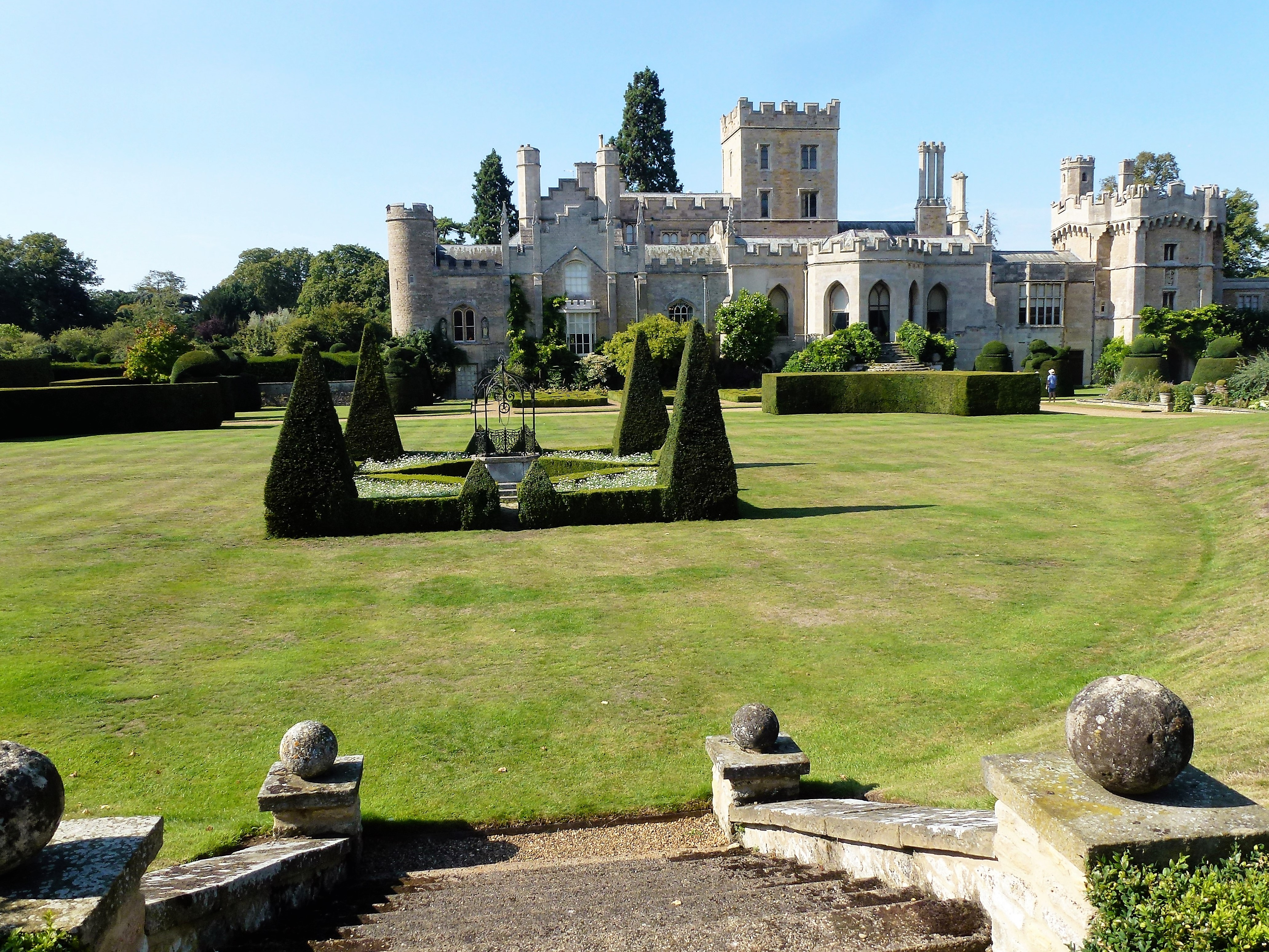
- Elton Hall

Site information
- Type: Baronial hall
- Owner: Proby Family
- Open to the public: end of May through September (see website for schedule)
- Website: http://www.eltonhall.com/

Location
- Shown within Cambridgeshire
- Coordinates: 52°31′25″N 0°23′51″W

Site history
- In use: 15th century-Present

Elton Hall is a country house in Elton, Cambridgeshire. It has been the ancestral home of the Proby family (sometime known as the Earls of Carysfort) since 1660.

The hall lies in an 3,800-acre (1,500 ha) estate through which the River Nene runs. The building incorporates 15th-, 17th-, 18th- and 19th-century parts and is a Grade I listed building. The Victorian gardens were renovated in the 20th and 21st centuries and contain a knot garden, a rose garden and a Gothic orangery built to celebrate the Millennium.

== Descent ==
=== Sapcote ===
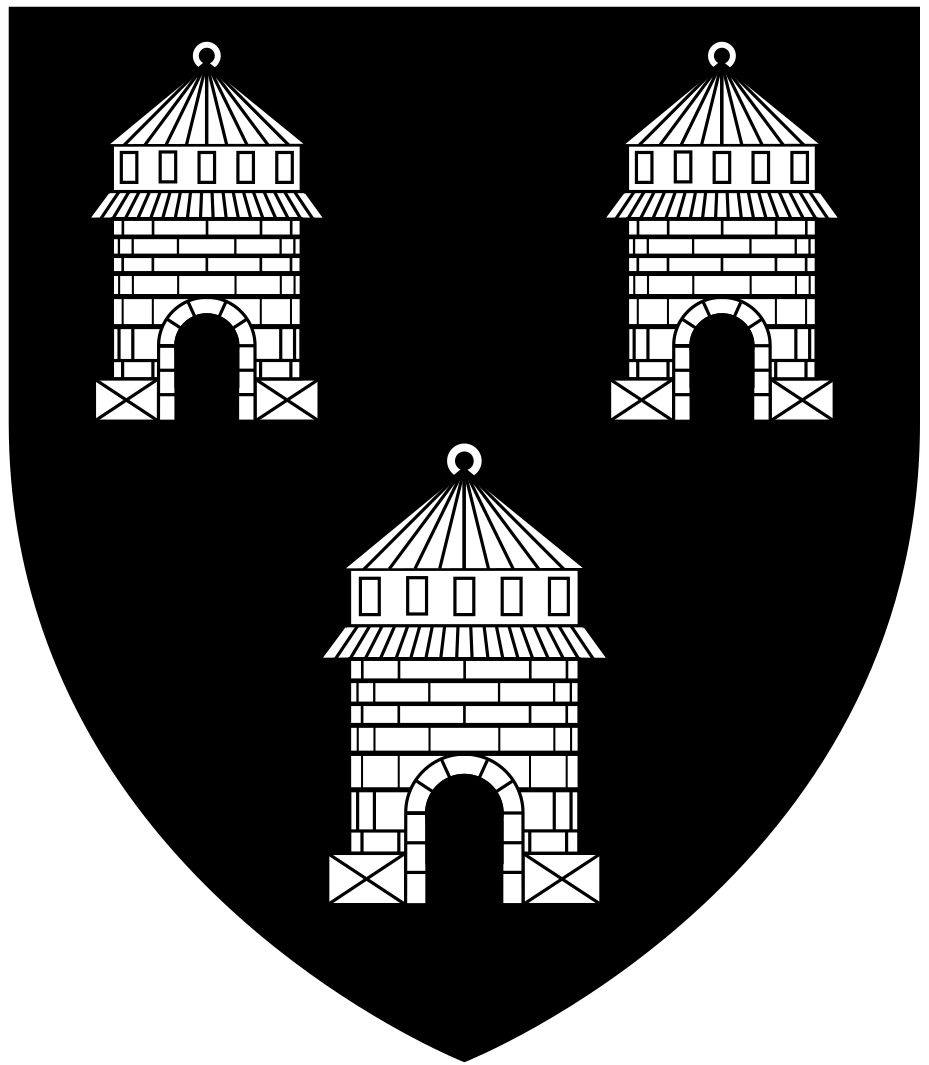
Arms of Sapcote: Sable, three dovecotes argent

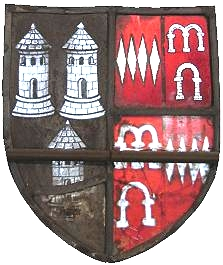
Arms of Sapcote Sable, three dovecotes argent impaling Dinham Gules, four fusils in fess ermine (quartering Arches Gules, three arches argent), Bampton Church, Devon

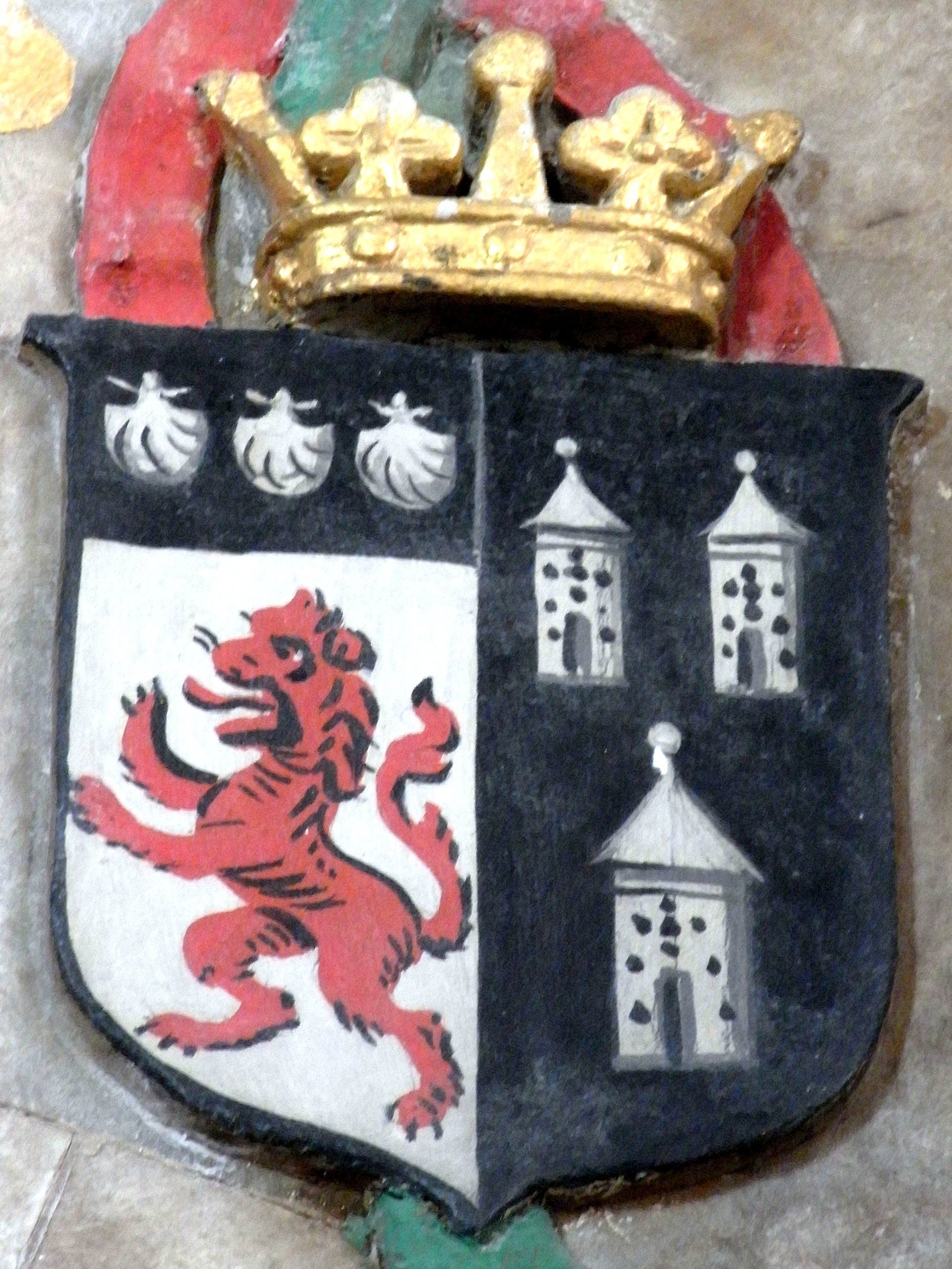
Arms of John Russell, 1st Earl of Bedford impaling Sapcote, for his marriage in 1526 to Anne Sapcote, daughter of Sir Guy Sapcote of Huntingdonshire. Tawstock Church, Devon

Elton Hall was built by Sir Richard Sapcote (d. 1477), who married Isabel Wolston, widow of Sir John Frauncis of Burley, Rutland. His sculpted arms survive in Elton Church showing his arms impaling three turnstiles, for Wolston.

Sir John Sapcote (d. 1501) added a large chapel at the south corner, described in Camden's Britannia as adorned with beautiful painted glass windows. He married (as her second husband) Elizabeth Dynham (died 1516), a daughter of Sir John Dinham (1406–1458) of Nutwell and Kingskerswell in South Devon and of Hartland in North Devon. Her first husband was Fulk Bourchier, 10th Baron FitzWarin, feudal baron of Bampton in Devon, and having survived Sapcote she remarried thirdly to Sir Thomas Brandon. A stained glass window in Bampton Church survives which records Sir John Sapcote's marriage, showing his arms impaling Dinham (Gules, four fusils in fess ermine) quartering Arches (Gules, three arches argent).

In 1526 John Russell, 1st Earl of Bedford (c.1485-1555), KG, married Anne Sapcote, daughter of Sir Guy Sapcote of Huntingdonshire by his wife Margaret Wolston and widow successively of John Broughton (d. 24 January 1518) of Toddington, Bedfordshire, by whom she had a son and three daughters, and secondly of Sir Richard Jerningham (d.1525), by whom she had no issue. By Anne Sapcote he was the father of Francis Russell, 2nd Earl of Bedford (1527–1585).

Robert Sapcote (d. Jan.1600/1), was probably the last of his family to live at Elton. His ledger stone formerly in the chapel of Elton Hall survives in Elton Church

=== Proby ===
Arms of Proby: Ermine, on a fess gules a lion passant or

Shortly after 1617 Elton was purchased by Sir Peter Proby, a former Lord Mayor of London, from the Sapcote family. The house was rebuilt between 1662 and 1689 by his grandson Sir Thomas Proby, 1st Baronet, incorporating the chapel and gatehouse of a previous 15th-century building. A new wing was also added to the west. He was succeeded by his younger brother John Proby (died 1710) who added a further extension. The estate descended via John's cousin to John Joshua Proby, 1st Earl of Carysfort, who carried out extensive modifications in the Gothic style between 1780 and 1815, of which part still remains.

In about 1855 it descended to Granville Leveson Proby, 3rd Earl of Carysfort, who employed the architect Henry Ashton to remodel the house, rebuilding the north-west cross wing and refacing other wings in stone. In 1860 the chapel range was extended and a bay between the chapel and the house rebuilt. Granville Leveson Proby, 4th Earl of Carysfort added a tower to the chapel block and a billiards room and kitchens to north-east. William Proby, 5th Earl of Carysfort demolished an 18th-century tower and built two octagonal turrets. Various other changes have taken place since.

On the 5th Earl's death in 1909 the estate passed, via his sister Lady Elizabeth Hamilton, to her son, Colonel Douglas Hamilton, who adopted the surname of Proby and laid out new gardens, which were further developed by Meredyth Proby (wife of Sir William Henry Proby, 3rd Baronet) from 1980. The property still remains in the private ownership of the Proby family (Proby baronets since 1952).

== The interior ==
The south front (garden) incorporates the 15th-century tower and chapel which date from the reign of Henry VII. The Marble Hall and main staircase were designed by Henry Ashton. They are a mid-19th-century recreation of an 18th-century decorative style. The drawing room was created from the medieval chapel in the mid-18th century and is the house's biggest room. The ceiling also dates from the 18th century, but the decoration is Ashton's, as is the dining room, although the Gothic windows are replicas of those which were once in the medieval chapel. The main library contains a large collection, and the house has three in total, including the inner library in the Sapcote Tower. The current chapel was formed from the undercroft of the Sapcotes' chapel and has original vaulting.

== See also ==
- Historic houses in England
