= Kanyaka Station =

Former sheep and cattle station in South Australia

Coordinates: 32.07257°S 138.29965°E

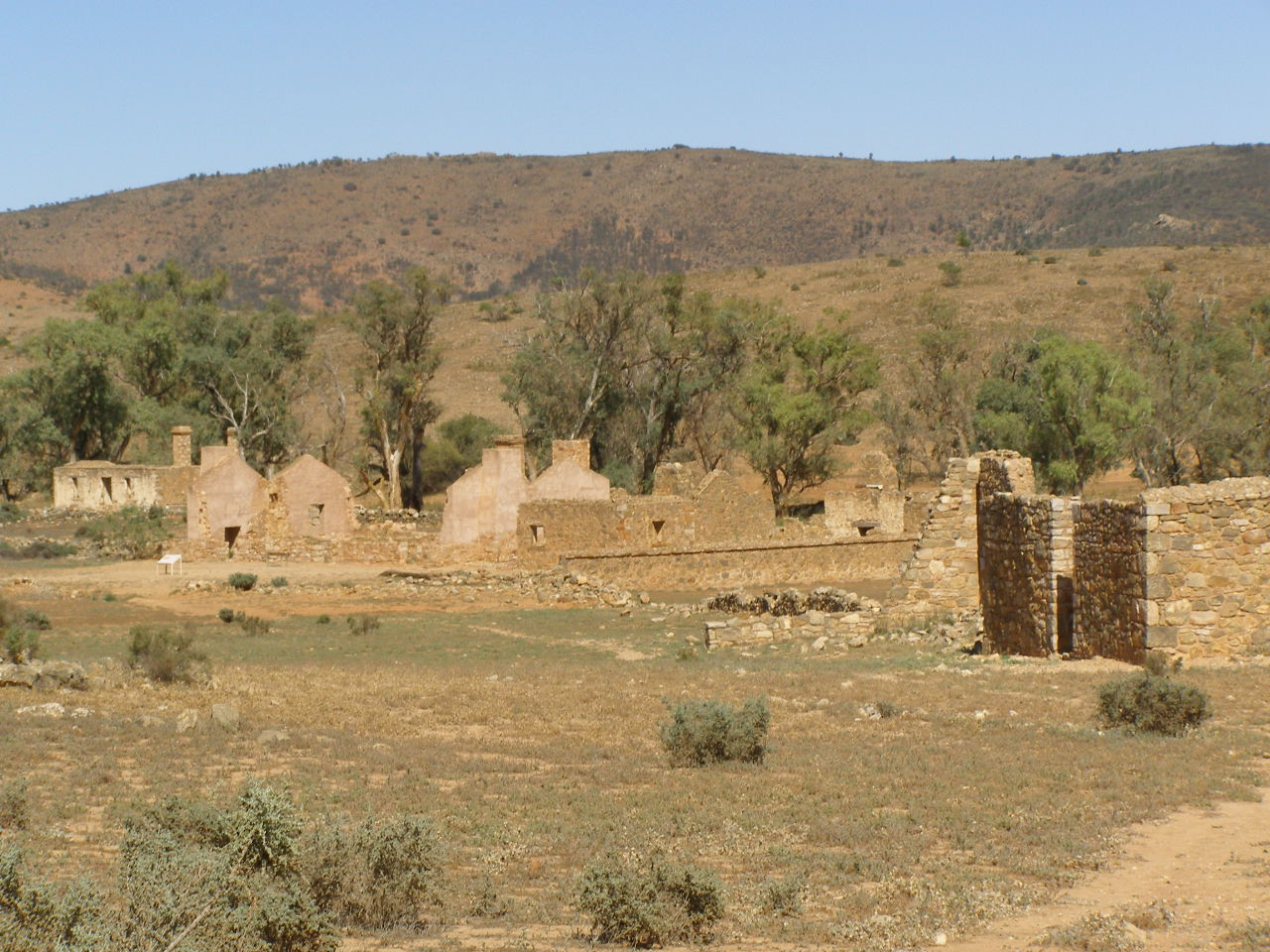
Kanyaka Station

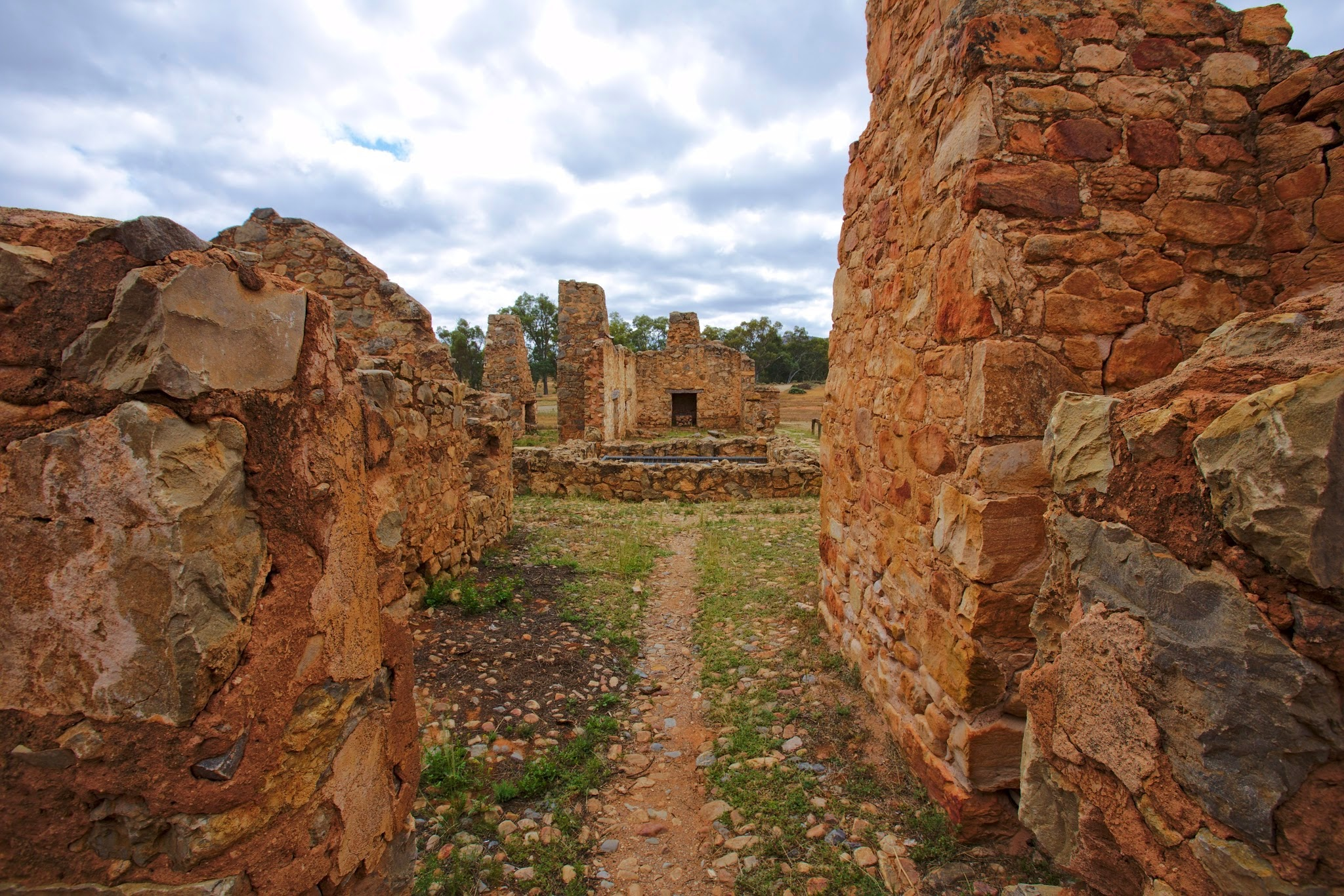
Close-up view of the ruins

Kanyaka Station was a cattle and sheep station in the Flinders Ranges of South Australia located at Kanyaka, approximately 40 km (25 mi) north-north-east of Quorn, South Australia. along Hawker-Stirling North Road (B83).

== History ==
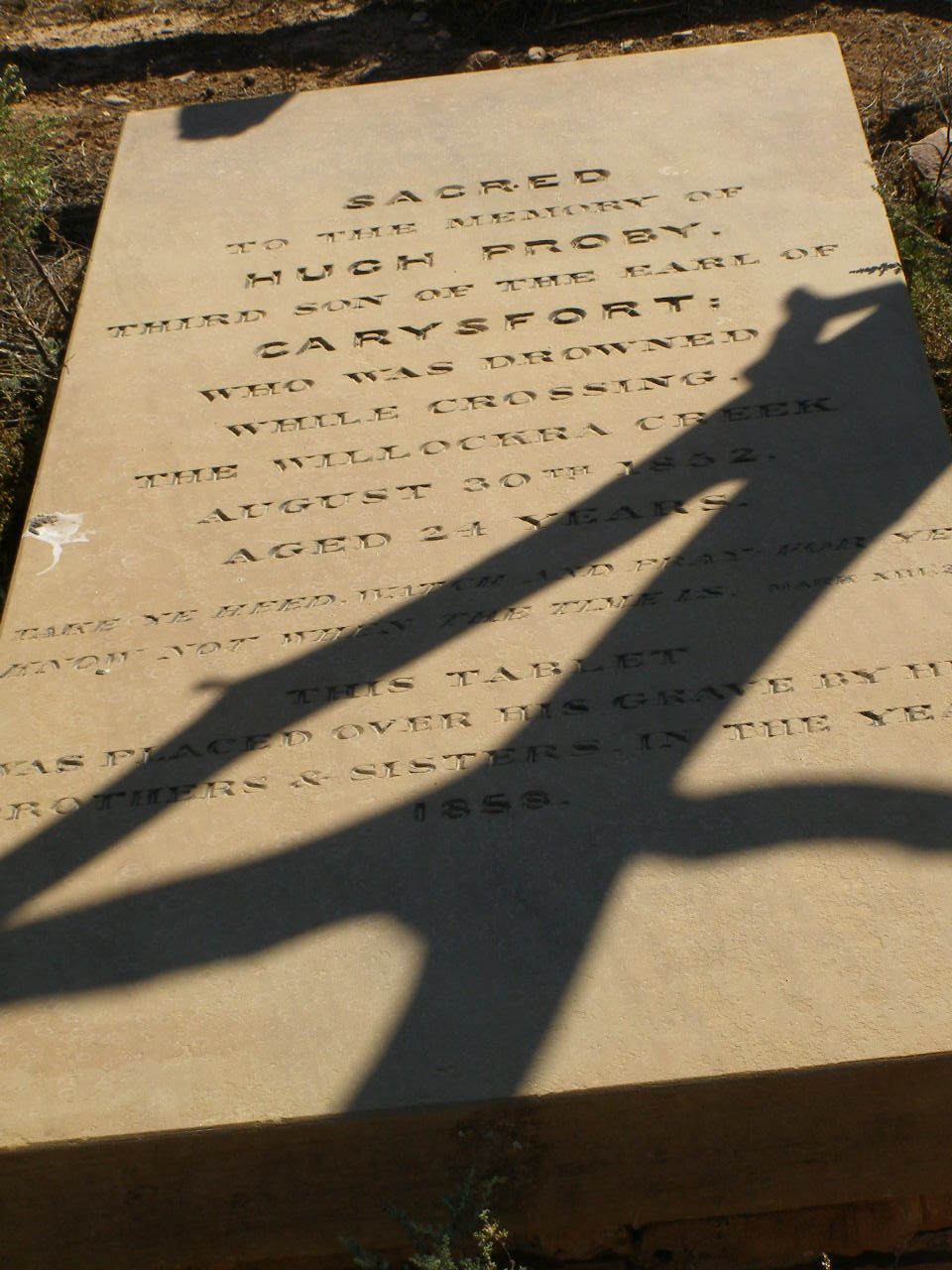
Grave of Hugh Proby, founder of Kanyaka Station

The area was inhabited by Aboriginal people for thousands of years before European settlement. The traditional owners of the area are the Barnggarla people. The name of the station is taken from the Aboriginal word thought to mean Place of stone.

Kanyaka Station was established as a cattle station in February 1852 by Hugh Proby. He was born on 9 April 1826 at Stamford in Lincolnshire, England, the third son of Admiral Granville Leveson Proby (the third Earl of Carysfort of Ireland) and Isabella Howard. He emigrated on the ship Wellington, which arrived on 30 May 1851 at Port Adelaide, South Australia.

On 30 August 1852, Proby drowned when he was swept from his horse crossing the swollen Willochra Creek while trying to herd a mob of cattle during a thunderstorm. Aged 24, he was buried the following day. Six years later in 1858 his grave was marked with an engraved slab shipped from Britain by his brothers and sisters; it was said to weigh one and a half tons and posed a significant challenge to transport it to the grave site.

Letters from Hugh Proby to his family in England during 1851-52 in which he describes his pioneering days establishing Kanyaka, as well as his Mookra Range run (now Coonatto station), were published in 1987 in a book. Proby's Kanyaka and Mookra Range holdings were sold to Alexander Grant. He and his brother, Frederick, settled on the Mookra Range run, which they renamed Coonatto.

Under subsequent owners, and particularly under resident manager John Randall Phillips, Kanyaka station grew in size until it was one of the largest in the district, with 70 families living and working there. Because of the difficulties of transport, the station had to be self-sufficient and Kanyaka station grew to include a large homestead, cottages for workers, workshops, huts and sheds, mostly built from local stone due to limited supplies of workable local timber. The station switched from cattle to sheep, but had cows, pigs, and vegetable gardens to supply food for the residents. There was also a cemetery. Proby was not buried in the Kanyaka cemetery, as it had not yet been established at the time of his death.

Severe droughts resulted in massive losses of sheep and eventually the station was abandoned. Due to its stone construction, many of the buildings survive today as ruins and are a popular tourist attraction.

Today, the ruins of the Kanyaka Station complex, including the nearby woolshed and cemetery, and the stone walling on the opposite side of the Hawker road, are located on the South Australian Heritage Register.

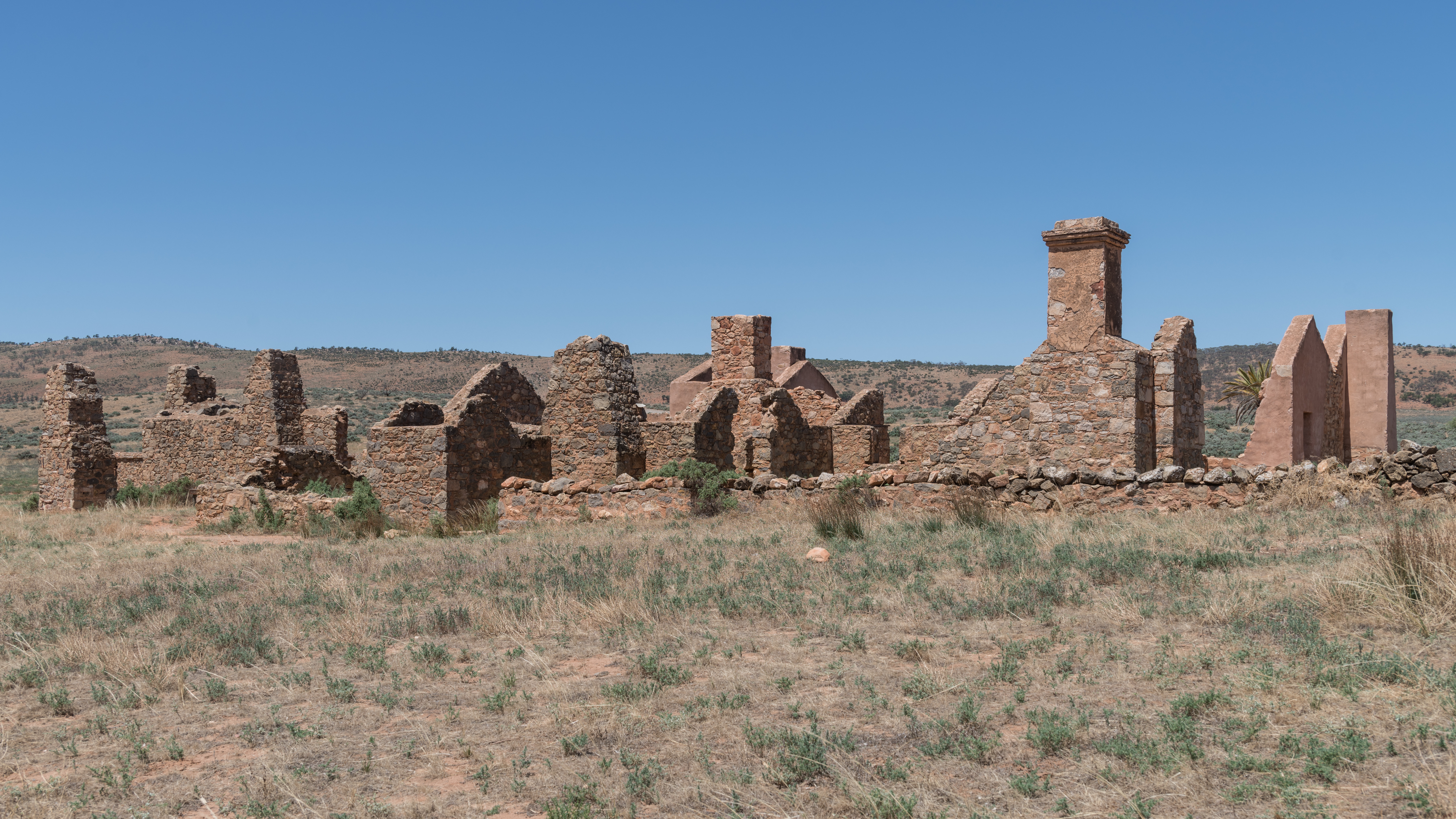
Abandoned Kanyaka Station homestead between Quorn and Hawker

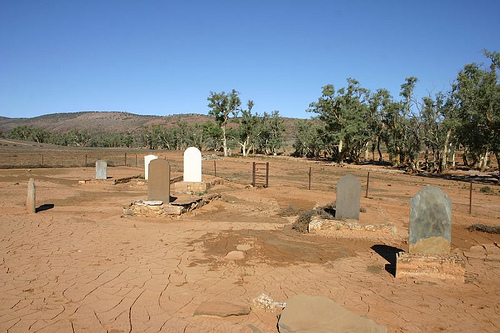
Kanyaka Cemetery

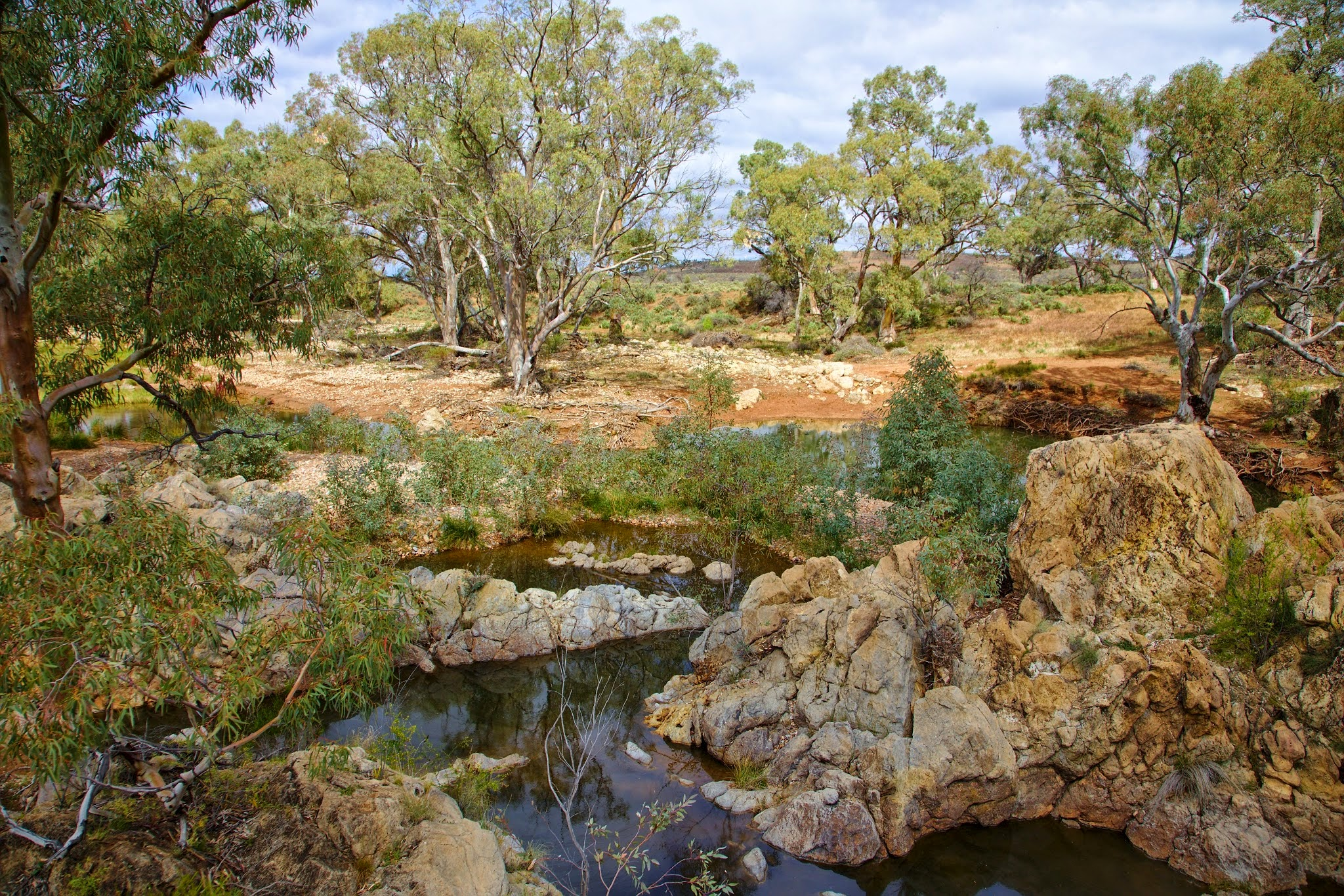
Death Rock and waterhole

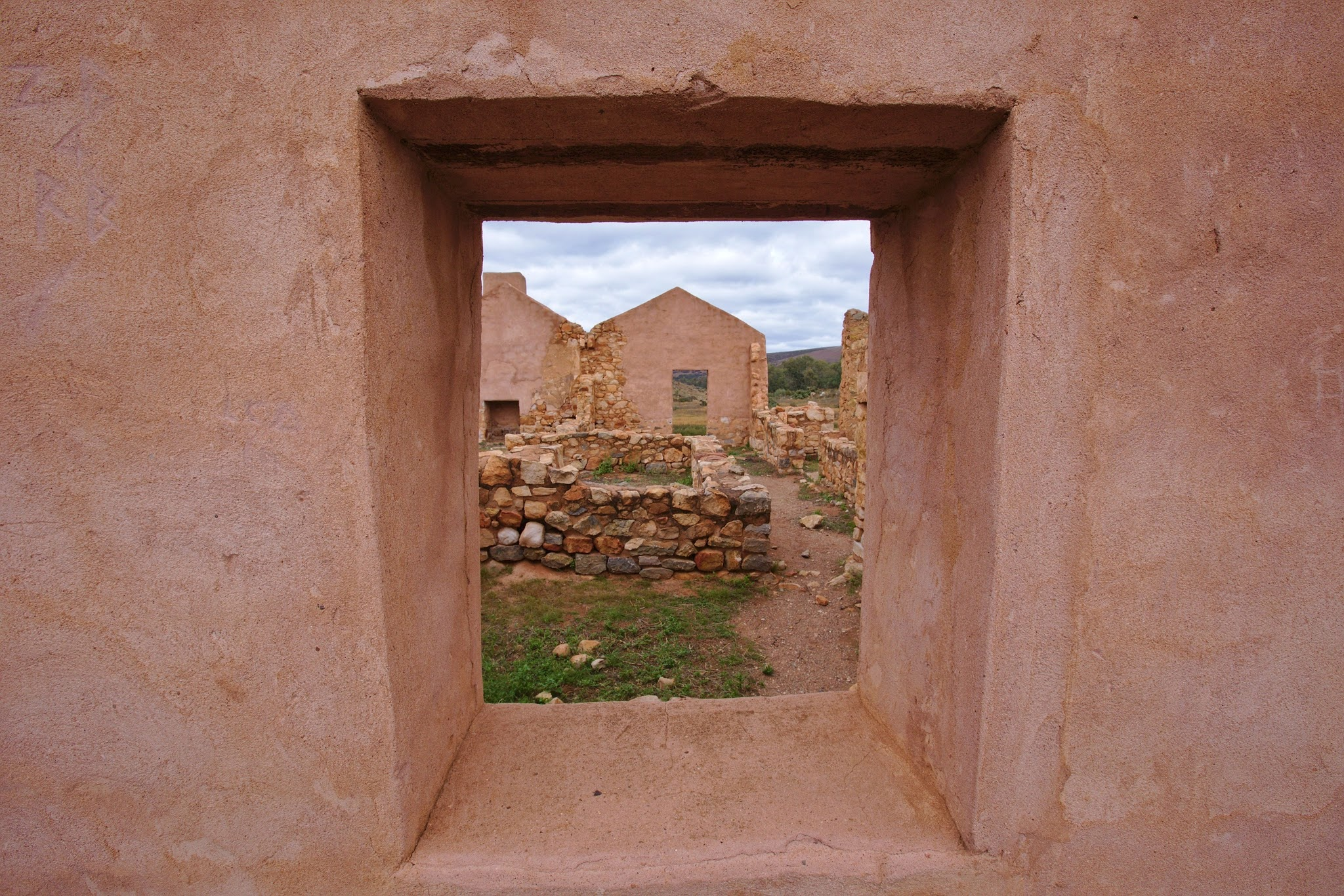
Ruins of Kanyaka Station

== See also ==
- List of ranches and stations
