= Granville Proby, 4th Earl of Carysfort =

Irish noble and British politician

The Right Honourable The Earl of Carysfort KP PC
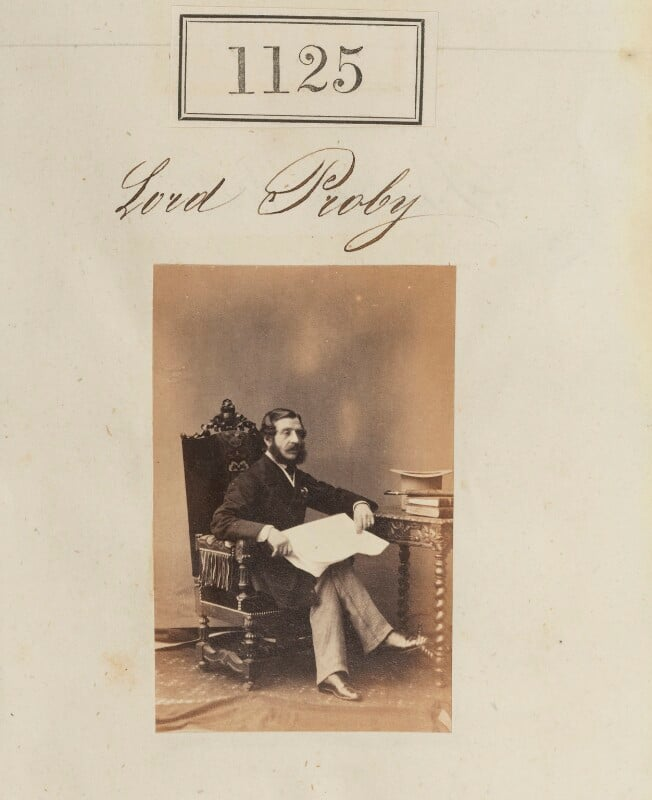
- Illustration of Lord Proby by Camille Silvy (1860)

Member of the House of Lords
- Lords Temporal
- Hereditary peer 1868–1872
- Preceded by: Granville Leveson Proby, 3rd Earl of Carysfort
- Succeeded by: William Proby, 5th Earl of Carysfort

Comptroller of the Household
- In office 23 June 1859 – 26 June 1866
- Monarch: Victoria
- Prime Minister: The Viscount Palmerston; The Earl Russell
- Preceded by: Hon. George Weld-Forester
- Succeeded by: Viscount Royston

Member of Parliament
- In office 1858–1868 Serving with William Wentworth FitzWilliam Hume
- Constituency: County Wicklow

Personal details
- Born: 14 September 1824 Bushy Park, County Wicklow
- Died: 18 May 1872 (aged 47) Florence, Italy
- Party: Liberal
- Spouse: Lady Augusta Hare (m. 1853)
- Parents: Granville Leveson Proby, 3rd Earl of Carysfort (father); Isabella Howard (mother)

Arms of Proby: Ermine, on a fess gules a lion passant or

Granville Leveson Proby, 4th Earl of Carysfort KP PC (14 September 1824 – 18 May 1872), styled Lord Proby from 1858 to 1868, was a British Liberal politician. He notably held office as Comptroller of the Household between 1859 and 1866.

== Background and early life ==
Proby was born at Bushey Park, Enniskerry, County Wicklow, the second son of Admiral Granville Leveson Proby, 3rd Earl of Carysfort, by Isabella Howard, daughter of the Honourable Hugh Howard. He became known by the courtesy title Lord Proby in 1858 on the death of his elder brother. He served with the 74th Regiment of Foot and achieved the rank of captain.

== Political career ==
In 1858 Proby was elected to the House of Commons for County Wicklow, and served under Lord Palmerston and then Lord Russell as Comptroller of the Household from 1859 to 1866. In 1868 he succeeded his father in the earldom and entered the House of Lords. He was admitted to the Privy Council in 1859 and made a Knight of the Order of St Patrick in 1869.

== Family ==
Lord Carysfort married Lady Augusta Maria Hare, daughter of William Hare, 2nd Earl of Listowel, in 1853. The marriage was childless. He died in Florence, Italy, in May 1872, aged 47, succeeded in his titles by his younger brother, William. The Dowager Countess of Carysfort died at Grosvenor Crescent, London, in March 1881, aged 48.

Parliament of the United Kingdom
Preceded by Sir Ralph Howard, Bt; William Wentworth FitzWilliam Hume	Member of Parliament for County Wicklow; 1858–1868; With: William Wentworth FitzWilliam Hume	Succeeded by William Wentworth FitzWilliam Hume; Hon. Henry Wentworth-FitzWilliam
Political offices
Preceded by Hon. George Weld-Forester	Comptroller of the Household; 1859–1866	Succeeded by Viscount Royston
Peerage of Ireland
Preceded by Granville Leveson Proby	Earl of Carysfort; 1868–1872	Succeeded by William Proby
