= Douglas Proby =

Douglas James Proby DL, JP (23 September 1856 – 18 November 1931), known as Douglas James Hamilton until 1904, was a British politician and soldier.

== Background ==
Born Douglas Hamilton, he was the only son of Lord Claud Hamilton (1813–1884) and his wife Lady Elizabeth Emma, second daughter of Granville Proby, 3rd Earl of Carysfort. John Hamilton, 1st Marquess of Abercorn, was his great-grandfather and James Hamilton, 1st Duke of Abercorn, his uncle. In 1904 he assumed by Royal licence the surname of Proby in lieu of his patronymic. He was educated at Eton College and matriculated on 15 January 1875 at Christ Church, Oxford, where he graduated with a Bachelor of Arts in 1879 and a Master of Arts in 1912.

== Military career ==
In January 1880, Proby was commissioned as 2nd lieutenant from the military college into the 109th Regiment of Foot. He was exchanged to the Coldstream Guards in April and when two years later the Anglo-Egyptian War erupted, he fought with the 1st Battalion . He then became involved into the Mahdist War with the 2nd Battalion and took part in the Battle of Suakin in 1888. After the end of the war in 1891, he was promoted to captain and transferred to the 5th Battalion, Royal Fusiliers. From 1897, he recruited new soldiers around Glasgow and in the following year, was advanced to major. Proby was attached to the Irish Guards in 1900 and became lieutenant-colonel after another four years. He was promoted to brevet-colonel in 1907 and retired in the following year. From 1914 Proby commanded a regimental district until 1917.

== Political career ==
Proby entered the British House of Commons as Member of Parliament for Saffron Walden in the January 1910 general election. However, he lost his seat in the December general election of the same year, and never returned to Parliament. He was appointed High Sheriff of Cambridgeshire and Huntingdonshire in 1923 and was a Justice of the Peace for Northamptonshire and for Hampshire. Proby represented the latter together with County Wicklow also as Deputy Lieutenant. He was invested as an Officer of the Most Venerable Order of the Hospital of St John of Jerusalem (OStJ).

== Family ==
On 6 July 1882, Proby married Lady Margaret Frances Hely-Hutchinson, daughter of Richard Hely-Hutchinson, 4th Earl of Donoughmore, and had by her four sons and a daughter. Proby died in 1931 at his residence Elton Hall. His oldest son Granville was a lord-lieutenant and his third son Richard was created a baronet.

== Arms ==
Coat of arms of Douglas Proby

Notes
Granted 17 September 1919 by George James Burtchaell, Deputy Ulster King of Arms.
Crest
An ostrich's head erased Proper ducally gorged and holding in the beak a key Or
Torse
Of the colours.
Escutcheon
Quarterly 1st & 4th Ermine on a fess Gules a lion passant Or (Proby) 2nd & 3rd Argent two bars wavy Azure on a chief of the last an estoile between two escallops Or (Cullen).
Motto
Manus Haec Inimica Tyrannis

Parliament of the United Kingdom
Preceded by Jack Pease	Member of Parliament for Saffron Walden; Jan 1910 – Dec 1910	Succeeded by Sir Cecil Beck
