= William Proby, 5th Earl of Carysfort =

British peer

Sir William Proby, 5th Earl of Carysfort KP JP DL
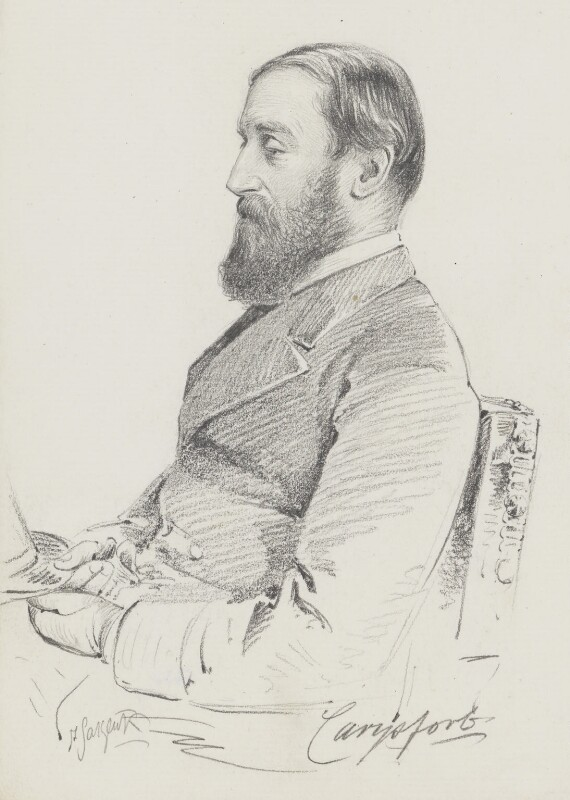
- Sketch of Earl Carysfort, c. 1870s/80s, by Frederick Sargent

Member of the House of Lords
- Lord Temporal
- Hereditary peer 1872–1909
- Preceded by: Granville Leveson Proby, 4th Earl of Carysfort
- Succeeded by: extinct

Lord-Lieutenant of County Wicklow
- In office 1890–1909
- Preceded by: Edward Leeson, 6th Earl of Milltown
- Succeeded by: Mervyn Wingfield, 8th Viscount Powerscourt

High Sheriff of Wicklow
- In office 1866

Personal details
- Born: 18 January 1836 nr. Arklow, County Wicklow
- Died: 4 September 1909 (aged 73) Stoke Poges, Buckinghamshire
- Spouse: Charlotte Mary Heathcote (m. 1860)
- Parent(s): Granville Proby, 3rd Earl of Carysfort (father); Isabella, née Howard (mother)
- Education: Eton College
- Alma mater: Trinity College, Cambridge

William Proby, 5th Earl of Carysfort KP (18 January 1836 – 4 September 1909), known as William Proby until 1872, was a British peer.

== Early life and education ==
Carysfort was the fourth son and youngest child of Admiral Granville Proby, 3rd Earl of Carysfort, and his wife Isabella (née Howard), who died only four days after his birth. He was educated at Eton and Trinity College, Cambridge, graduating with an MA in 1859.

== Military career ==
He was commissioned as a Captain in the part-time Wicklow Militia on 16 May 1861, retiring on 26 March 1872.

== Public offices ==
The Honourable William Proby served as High Sheriff of Wicklow in 1866 and as Lord-Lieutenant of County Wicklow from 1890 to 1909. In 1872, he succeeded his elder brother Graville Leveson Proby in the earldom upon his death, entering the House of Lords. In the same year, he was appointed as Deputy Lieutenant of Huntingdonshire. He was made a Knight of the Order of St Patrick in 1874.

Arms of Proby: Ermine, on a fess gules a lion passant or

== Personal life and death ==
Lord Carysfort married Charlotte Mary, daughter of Reverend Robert Boothby Heathcote, in 1860. The marriage was childless.

The lord owned almost 26,000 acres in Counties Wicklow, Northampton, Dublin and Kildare. He had a sizeable arts collection, mostly held at the Proby estate in Huntingdonshire, Elton Hall.

Lord Carysfort died in September 1909, aged 73, when all his titles became extinct. His estate was inherited by his nephew Douglas Proby, son of his sister Emma Elizabeth and Lord Claud Hamilton, who had changed his surname to Proby by royal license in 1904. Lord Carysford was survived by his wife, who died on 13 January 1918.

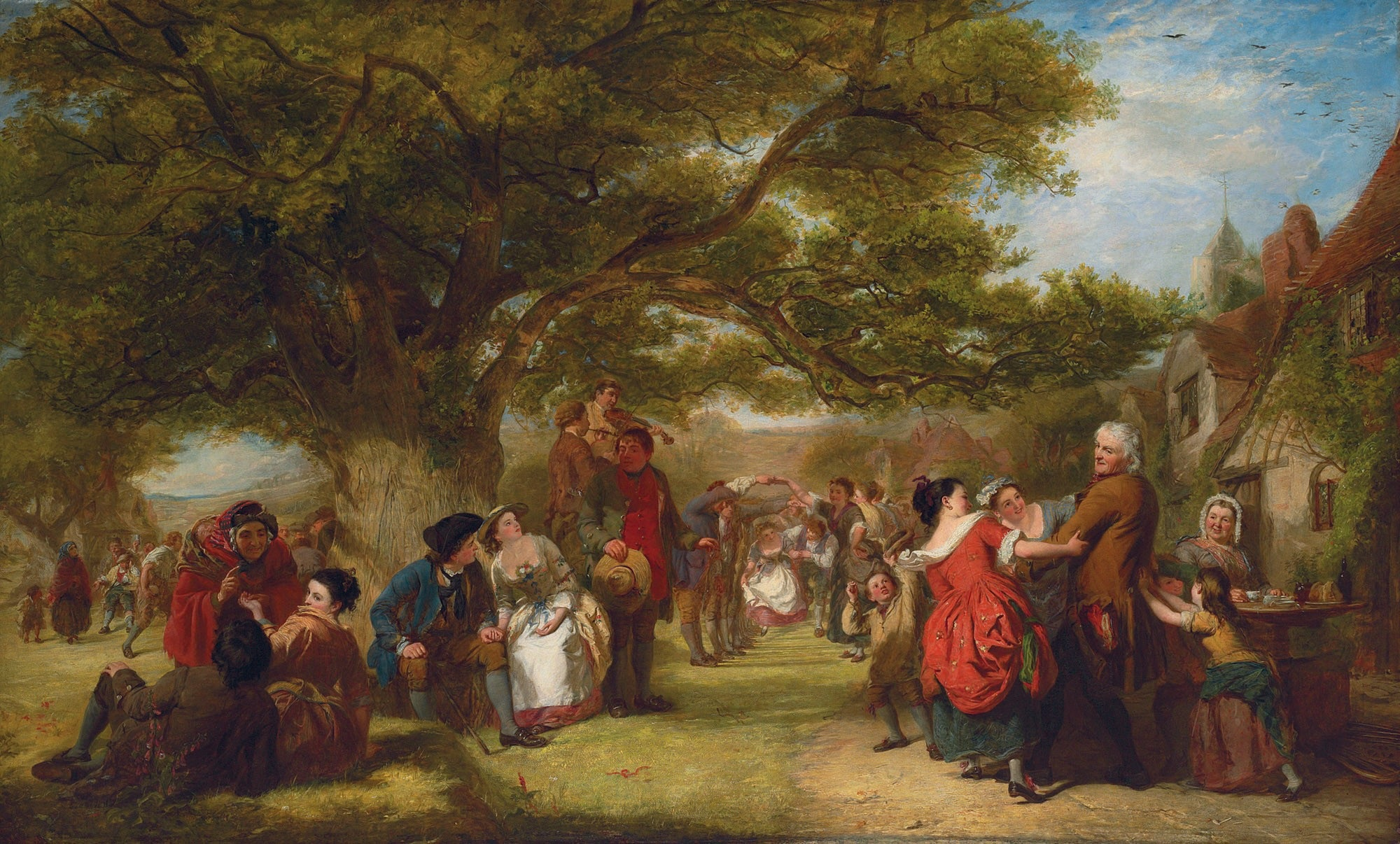
An English Merrymaking a Hundred Years Ago by William Powell Frith. One of the many paintings purchased by the 5th Earl of Caryfort.

Honorary titles
Preceded by The Earl of Milltown	Lord Lieutenant of Wicklow; 1890–1909	Succeeded by The Viscount Powerscourt
Peerage of Ireland
Preceded by Granville Leveson Proby	Earl of Carysfort; 1872–1909	Extinct
