= William Proby, Lord Proby =

Royal Navy officer and politician (1779–1804)

Captain Lord Proby MP
- Born: 19 June 1779
- Died: 6 August 1804 (aged 25); HMS Amelia, at Surinam
- Burial place: St Michael's Cathedral, Bridgetown, Barbados
- Military career
- Allegiance: United Kingdom
- Branch: Royal Navy
- Service years: 1792? - 1804
- Rank: Post-Captain
- Commands: HMS Emerald (temporary); Fireship HMS Tarleton; HMS Peterel; HMS Danae; HMS Amelia
- Conflicts: French Revolutionary Wars; Napoleonic Wars

Arms of Proby: Ermine, on a fess gules a lion passant or

William Allen Proby, Lord Proby (19 June 1779 – 6 August 1804) was a British Royal Navy officer and Whig politician.

== Background and education ==
Proby was the eldest son of John Proby, 2nd Baron Carysfort (later 1st Earl of Carysfort, and his first wife Elizabeth (née Osbourne). He was educated at Rugby School, Warwickshire, England from 1788.

== Royal Naval service ==
Proby was commissioned into the Royal Navy and was promoted quickly, probably due to the influence of his family; while serving on the Lisbon station, in December 1797, he was placed in temporary command of HMS Emerald and by 1798, at the age of 19, he had been promoted to post-captain having also commanded the fireship Tarleton and the sloop Peterel. He became the captain of Danae and in her suffered a mutiny on 14 March 1800; forty of the crew seized the ship off Le Conquet, Brest. The mutiny seems to have been caused by Danae being overburdened with French and American sailors conscripted unwillingly, and possibly a rather lax approach to discipline. Having secured the loyal crew below decks, the mutineers gave up the ship to the French 16-gun brig-corvette Colombe, which sent over a boarding party. Lord Proby surrendered the ship with the words "To the French nation, but not to mutineers." He and the loyal members of his crew were exchanged on parole, having received favourable treatment from the French authorities.

He took command of Amelia in April 1802, and in May sailed to Cork, Waterford and Dublin to land 150 discharged seaman. The summer was spent combatting smugglers between Berry Head and Mount's Bay, and by the end of August, Amelia had sailed for Den Helder with Dutch troops discharged from the British service. Amelia was based in Portsmouth for most of 1803, sailing to Jersey and the Downs, and blockading Dutch ports. Proby captured as prizes a French chasse-marée in ballast on 23 May, and on 11 August the French privateer lugger Alert.

Amelia deployed to the Leeward Islands station, notorious at the time for disease; Lord Proby died from yellow fever in Surinam in August 1804, aged 25, while in command of the frigate. He was buried in a vault in St Michael's Cathedral, Bridgetown, Barbados, where a tablet records his death.

== Member of Parliament ==
He represented Buckingham as a Whig in the House of Commons from 1802 until his death in 1804. His younger brother John succeeded him as Member of Parliament for Buckingham.

== Title ==
From 1789, when his father was created Earl of Carysfort in the Peerage of Ireland, William Proby was styled as Lord Proby. He died unmarried and his younger brother John succeeded to the earldom when his father died in April 1828.

Parliament of the United Kingdom
Preceded by George Nugent; Thomas Grenville	Member of Parliament for Buckingham with Thomas Grenville; 1802–1804	Succeeded by Thomas Grenville; Lord Proby
