= Granville Proby, 3rd Earl of Carysfort =

Royal Navy Admiral and Whig politician (1782–1868)

Admiral The Right Honourable The Earl of Carysfort

Member of Parliament for County Wicklow
- In office 1816–1829

Personal details
- Born: 12 November 1782
- Died: 3 November 1868 (aged 85) Elton Hall, Huntingdonshire
- Party: Whig
- Spouse: Isabella Howard (m. 1818–1836)
- Children: 4 sons and 4 daughters
- Education: Rugby School

Military service
- Allegiance: United Kingdom
- Branch/service: Royal Navy
- Years of service: 1798–1816
- Rank: Admiral
- Commands: HMS Bergère; HMS Madras; HMS Juno; HMS Iris; HMS Laurel; HMS Amelia
- Battles/wars: French Revolutionary Wars; Battle of the Nile; Battle of the Malta Convoy; Action of 31 March 1800; Napoleonic Wars; Battle of Trafalgar

Arms of Proby: Ermine, on a fess gules a lion passant or

Admiral Granville Leveson Proby, 3rd Earl of Carysfort (12 November 1782 – 3 November 1868), known as The Honourable Granville Proby until 1855, was a British naval commander and Whig politician.

== Biography ==
Carysfort was the third and youngest son of John Proby, 1st Earl of Carysfort, and his first wife Elizabeth (née Osbourne), and was educated at Rugby School between 1792 and 1798.

=== Naval career ===
Proby entered the Navy on 21 March 1798 as a midshipman aboard the 74-gun ship Vanguard under the command of Captain Edward Berry, and serving as the flagship of Sir Horatio Nelson. Proby saw action at the Battle of the Nile on 1 August 1799, then transferred to the ship Foudroyant with Captain Berry, and while blockading Malta, took part in the capture, on 18 February 1800, of the ship Généreux and the armed store-ship Ville de Marseilles. He also took part in the action of 31 March 1800 in which Foudroyant, in company with the 64-gun ship Lion and frigate Penelope, captured the French ship Guillaume Tell, the flagship of Rear-Admiral Denis Decrès, during which Foudroyant sustained a loss of 8 men killed and 64, including Proby, wounded.

In 1801 he was present in Foudroyant under Admiral Lord Keith during the Egyptian campaign. He then served aboard the frigate Santa Teresa, under Captain Robert Campbell; the frigate Resistance, Captain Hon. Philip Wodehouse; and HMS Victory, flagship of Lord Nelson. There, on 24 October 1804, he was promoted to lieutenant, and transferred to the frigate Narcissus, Captain Ross Donnelly. In May 1805 he transferred to the 98-gun ship Neptune, Captain Thomas Fremantle, and was present on 21 October in the Battle of Trafalgar.

On 15 August 1806 Proby was appointed commander of the sloop Bergère, and promoted to post-rank on 28 November 1806, with command of the 54-gun ship Madras. From 7 January 1807 he commanded the frigate Juno in the Mediterranean, and from 1808 until 1810, the frigate Iris, in the Channel, North Sea, and Baltic. On 8 June 1813 he was appointed to Laurel, stationed at the Cape of Good Hope, and on 3 December 1814 to Amelia, in the Mediterranean. Amelia (the ship in which his eldest brother William had died in 1804) was paid off in July 1816, ending Proby's active naval career. However, the course of time brought promotion to rear-admiral on 23 November 1841, to vice-admiral on 16 June 1851, and finally admiral on 9 July 1857.

=== Political career ===
Apart from his military career Carysfort also represented County Wicklow in Parliament from 1816 to 1829 and served as High Sheriff of Wicklow for 1831. In 1855 he succeeded his elder brother to the earldom and entered the House of Lords.

=== Personal life ===
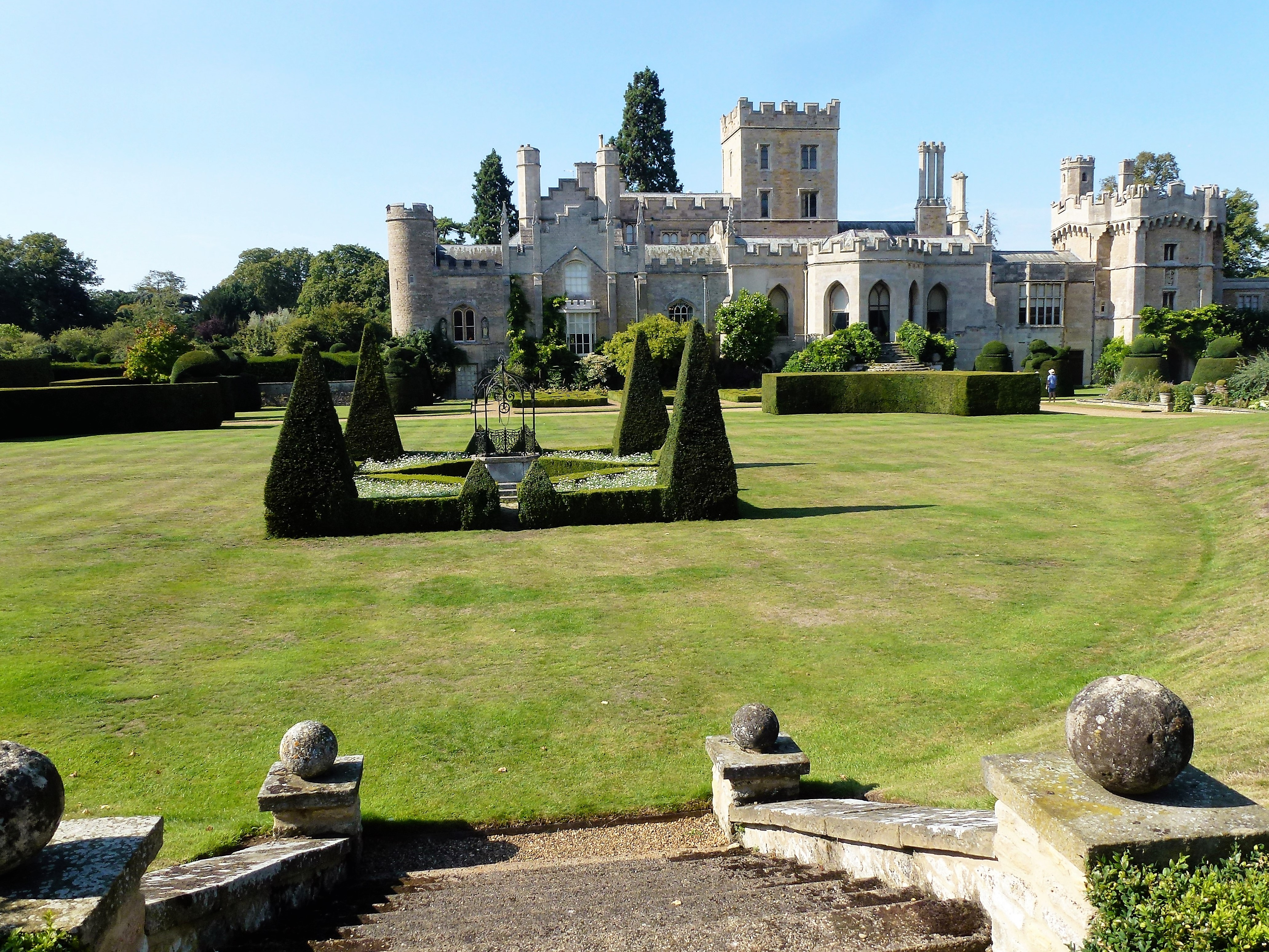
Elton Hall, Cambridgeshire

Proby married in 1818 Isabella Howard, daughter of the Honourable Hugh Howard. They had four sons and four daughters. She died in 1836, shortly after the birth of her youngest child. Lord Carysfort died on 3 November 1868, aged 85, at the family estate of Elton Hall, and was succeeded in the earldom by his second but eldest surviving son Granville. Children included:

- John Joshua Proby, Lord Proby (1823–1858)
- Granville Leveson Proby, 4th Earl of Carysfort (1824–1872)
- Honourable Hugh Proby (1826–1852), who emigrated to Australia and died there
- Lady Theodosia Gertrude Proby (1833–1902), who married William Montagu Baillie, of Dochfour (1827–1902; he was a grandson of the 5th Duke of Manchester)
- William Proby, 5th Earl of Carysfort (1836–1909)
- Lady Frances Proby (d.1863), unmarried
- Lady Emma Elizabeth Proby (d.1900), who married Lord Claud Hamilton (1813–1884)
- Lady Isabella Proby (d.1866)

== See also ==
- Hugh Proby

Parliament of the United Kingdom
Preceded by William Hoare Hume; William Tighe	Member of Parliament for County Wicklow; 1816–1829; With: William Tighe 1816; George Ponsonby 1816–1817; William Parnell-Hayes 1817–1821; James Grattan 1821–1829	Succeeded by James Grattan; Sir Ralph Howard
Peerage of Ireland
Preceded by John Proby	Earl of Carysfort; 1855–1868	Succeeded by Granville Leveson Proby
