= Elton, Cambridgeshire =

Village in Cambridgeshire, England

Coordinates: 52.53°N 0.40°W

Elton
- Location within Cambridgeshire
- Population: 679 (2011)
- OS grid reference: TL086385
- District: Huntingdonshire
- Shire county: Cambridgeshire
- Region: East
- Country: England
- Sovereign state: United Kingdom
- Post town: Peterborough
- Postcode district: PE8
- Police: Cambridgeshire
- Fire: Cambridgeshire
- Ambulance: East of England
- UK Parliament: North West Cambridgeshire

Elton is a village and civil parish in the Huntingdonshire district of Cambridgeshire, England. Elton lies approximately 7 miles (11 km) south-west of Peterborough.

The village lies within the historic boundaries of Huntingdonshire (now part of Cambridgeshire), England. It lies on the B671 road. Elton Hall and the hamlet of Over End are located on the same road a mile south of the village.

== History ==
In 1085, William the Conqueror ordered that a survey should be carried out across his kingdom to discover who owned which parts and what it was worth. The survey took place in 1086 and the results were recorded in what, since the 12th century, has become known as the Domesday Book. Starting with the king himself, for each landholder within a county there is a list of their estates or manors; and, for each manor, there is a summary of the resources of the manor, the amount of annual rent that was collected by the lord of the manor both in 1066 and in 1086, together with the taxable value.

Elton was listed in the Domesday Book in the Hundred of Willybrook in Northamptonshire; the name of the settlement was written as Adelintune in the Domesday Book.

In 1086, there were three manors at Elton; the annual rent paid to the lords of the manors in 1066 had been £14.25 and the rent had increased to £16.75 in 1086.

The Domesday Book does not explicitly detail the population of a place but it records that there were 37 households at Elton. There is no consensus about the average size of a household at that time; estimates range from 3.5 to 5.0 people per household. Using these figures then an estimate of the population of Elton in 1086 is that it was within the range of 129 and 185 people.

The Domesday Book uses a number of units of measure for areas of land that are now unfamiliar terms, such as hides and ploughlands. In different parts of the country, these were terms for the area of land that a team of eight oxen could plough in a single season and are equivalent to 120 acres (49 hectares); this was the amount of land that was considered to be sufficient to support a single family. By 1086, the hide had become a unit of tax assessment rather than an actual land area; a hide was the amount of land that could be assessed as £1 for tax purposes. The survey records that there were 28 ploughlands at Elton in 1086. In addition to the arable land, there was 184 acres (74 hectares) of meadows and two water mills at Elton.

The tax assessment in the Domesday Book was known as geld or danegeld and was a type of land-tax based on the hide or ploughland. It was originally a way of collecting a tribute to pay off the Danes when they attacked England, and was only levied when necessary. Following the Norman Conquest, the geld was used to raise money for the King and to pay for continental wars; by 1130, the geld was being collected annually. Having determined the value of a manor's land and other assets, a tax of so many shillings and pence per pound of value would be levied on the land holder. While this was typically two shillings in the pound the amount did vary; for example, in 1084 it was as high as six shillings in the pound. For the manors at Elton the total tax assessed was 12 geld.

By 1086 there was already a church and a priest at Elton. Elton's medieval buildings were destroyed long ago and archaeologists have not been able to excavate the ruins.

The manor house of Elton belonged to the Abbot of Ramsey Abbey, who also held 23 other manors. He didn't live in Elton and rarely visited it. His officials ran the manor for him. They had to keep records of all the money spent and received.

Elton is two miles away from Fotheringhay Castle, where Mary, Queen of Scots was beheaded in 1587.

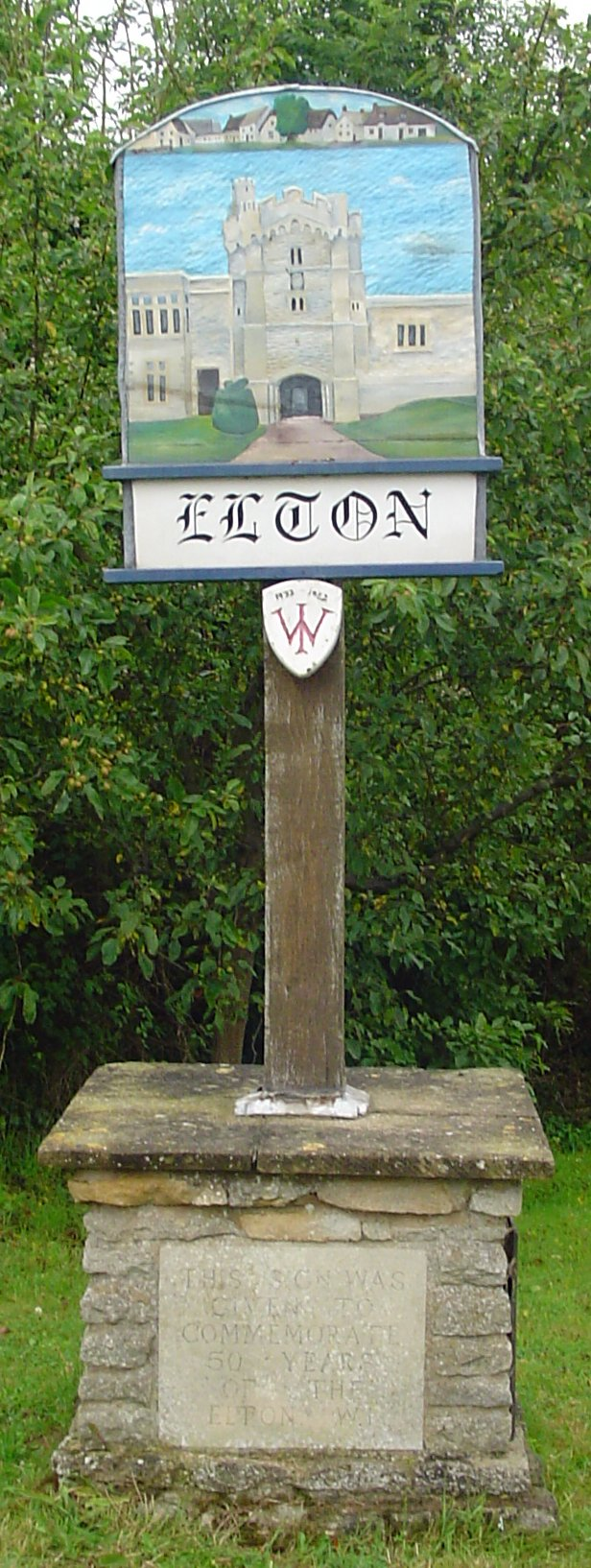
Village sign in Elton

== Government ==
As a civil parish, Elton has a parish council. The parish council is elected by the residents of the parish who have registered on the electoral roll; the parish council is the lowest tier of government in England. A parish council is responsible for providing and maintaining a variety of local services including allotments and a cemetery; grass cutting and tree planting within public open spaces such as a village green or playing fields. The parish council reviews all planning applications that might affect the parish and makes recommendations to Huntingdonshire District Council, which is the local planning authority for the parish. The parish council also represents the views of the parish on issues such as local transport, policing and the environment. The parish council raises its own tax to pay for these services, known as the parish precept, which is collected as part of the Council Tax. The parish council consists of eight councillors together with a parish clerk.

The parish council normally meets on the third Tuesday of the month at Highgate Hall.

Elton was in the historic and administrative county of Huntingdonshire until 1965. From 1965, the village was part of the new administrative county of Huntingdon and Peterborough. Then, in 1974, following the Local Government Act 1972, Elton became a part of the county of Cambridgeshire.

The second tier of local government is Huntingdonshire District Council which is a non-metropolitan district of Cambridgeshire and has its headquarters in Huntingdon. Huntingdonshire District Council has 52 councillors representing 29 district wards.

Huntingdonshire District Council collects the council tax, and provides services such as building regulations, local planning, environmental health, leisure and tourism.

Elton is a part of the district ward of Elton and Folksworth and is represented on the district council by one councillor. District councillors serve for four-year terms following elections to Huntingdonshire District Council.

For Elton the highest tier of local government is Cambridgeshire County Council which has administration buildings in Cambridge. The county council provides county-wide services such as major road infrastructure, fire and rescue, education, social services, libraries and heritage services. Cambridgeshire County Council consists of 69 councillors representing 60 electoral divisions. Elton is part of the electoral division of Norman Cross and is represented on the county council by two councillors.

At Westminster Elton is in the parliamentary constituency of North West Cambridgeshire, and elects one Member of Parliament (MP) by the first past the post system of election. Elton is represented in the House of Commons by Shailesh Vara (Conservative). Shailesh Vara has represented the constituency since 2005. The previous member of parliament was Brian Mawhinney (Conservative) who represented the constituency between 1997 and 2005.

== Demography ==
=== Population ===
In the period 1801 to 1901 the population of Elton was recorded every ten years by the UK census. During this time the population was in the range of 674 (the lowest was in 1901) and 947 (the highest was in 1861).

From 1901, a census was taken every ten years with the exception of 1941 (due to the Second World War).

Parish	1911	1921	1931	1951	1961	1971	1981	1991	2001	2011
Elton	607	539	551	980	550	501	533	624	726	679

All population census figures from report Historic Census figures Cambridgeshire to 2011 by Cambridgeshire Insight.

In 2011, the parish covered an area of 3,771 acres (1,526 hectares) and so the population density for Elton in 2011 was 115.2 persons per square mile (44.5 per square kilometre).

== Culture and community ==
Elton has a school called Elton Church of England Primary School. The village has two pubs: The Crown Inn and The Black Horse, two hair salons, a general stores shop and a garden centre.

== Landmarks ==
Elton used to have a railway station but it closed in 1953. It is now a popular walk.

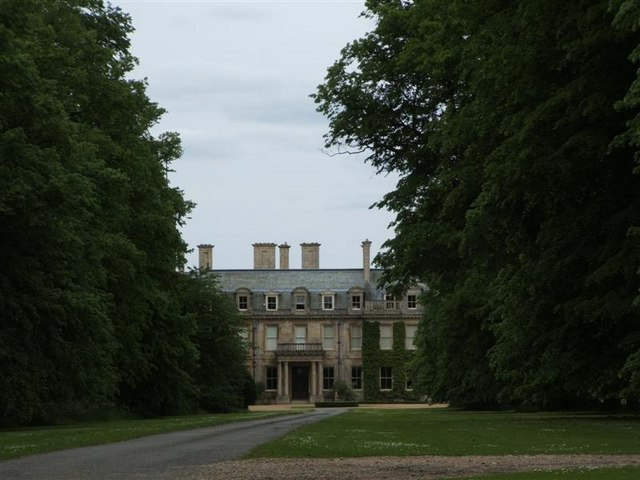
Elton Hall

Elton Hall, which is the home of Sir William Proby, is a part Gothic house, which stands in the midst of unspoilt landscaped parkland. It offers a mix of styles and is surrounded by expansive gardens. Elton Hall lies at the heart of a 3,800 acre Estate made up of farms, houses, cottages and commercial property, together with woodland. The Estate straddles the Cambridgeshire and Northamptonshire borders.
