= Mount Fitzwilliam =

Mountain in British Columbia, Canada

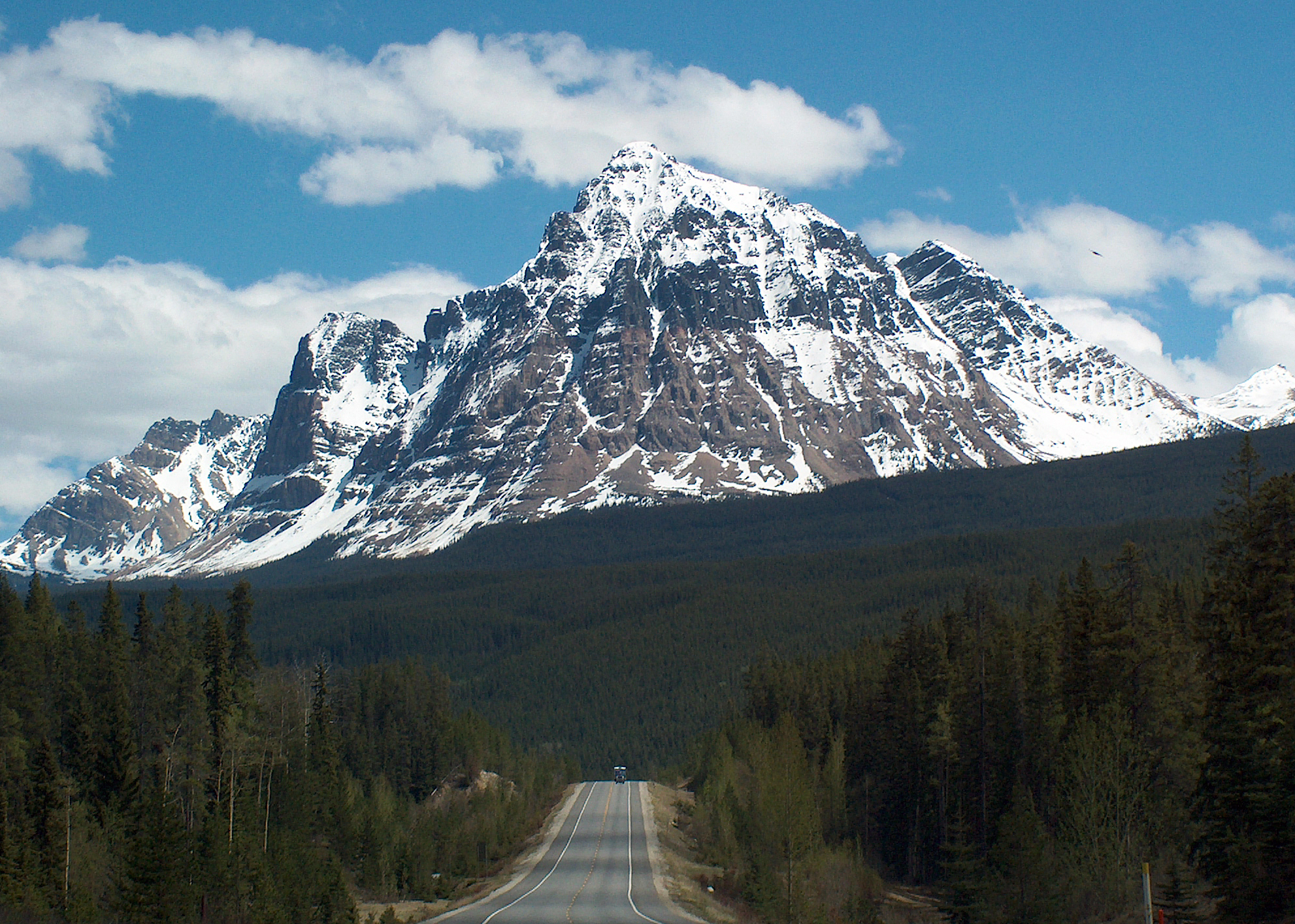
- Mount Fitzwilliam from eastbound Highway 16, the Yellowhead Highway

Highest point
- Elevation: 2,901 m (9,518 ft)
- Prominence: 731 m (2,398 ft)
- Parent peak: Roche Noire (2921 m)
- Listing: Mountains of British Columbia
- Coordinates: 52°49′50″N 118°27′25″W

Geography
- Location within British Columbia Location within Canada
- Interactive map of Mount Fitzwilliam
- Location: British Columbia, Canada
- District: Cariboo Land District
- Parent range: Park Ranges; Canadian Rockies
- Topo map: NTS 83D16 Jasper

Geology
- Rock age: Cambrian
- Rock type(s): quartzite and dolomite

Climbing
- First ascent: 1917 Interprovincial Boundary Commission
- Easiest route: Scrambling YDS 3

Mount Fitzwilliam is a 2,901-metre (9,518-foot) mountain summit located in the Canadian Rockies within Mount Robson Provincial Park in British Columbia, Canada. Mount Fitzwilliam is situated 6.0 km (3.7 mi) south of Yellowhead Pass and 4.0 km (2.5 mi) west of the Continental Divide, near the headwaters of the Fraser River. Its nearest higher peak is Roche Noire, 8.5 km (5.3 mi) to the east. Mt. Fitzwilliam is a prominent landmark seen from eastbound Highway 16 before travelers enter Jasper National Park from the west entrance. The mountain is also visible to riders on the Canadian train.

== History ==
The mountain was named on July 8, 1863, by Walter Cheadle after Viscount Milton (1839–1877) whose father was William Wentworth-Fitzwilliam, 6th Earl Fitzwilliam. Milton and his personal physician Dr. Walter Cheadle were traveling together up the Athabasca River and may be the first "tourists" to travel through Yellowhead Pass. They later co-authored "The North-West Passage by Land" and " Voyage de l'Atlantique au Pacifique, à travers le Canada", which described their expedition in considerable detail.

The mountain's name was officially adopted February 7, 1951, by the Geographical Names Board of Canada. It was labelled on Arthur O. Wheeler's 1911 topographic map of Mount Robson.

The first ascent of the mountain was made in 1917 by the Interprovincial Boundary Commission.

== Climate ==
Based on the Köppen climate classification, Mount Fitzwilliam is located in a subarctic climate zone with cold, snowy winters, and mild summers. Temperatures can drop below −20 °C with wind chill factors below −30 °C. The months July through September offer the most favorable weather for viewing and climbing this mountain. Precipitation runoff from the mountain drains into tributaries of the Fraser River.

== Geology ==
The mountain is composed of sedimentary rock laid down during the Precambrian to Jurassic periods and pushed east and over the top of younger rock during the Laramide orogeny. The lower half of the mountain is composed of dolomite, whereas the upper half is quartzite.

== Gallery ==
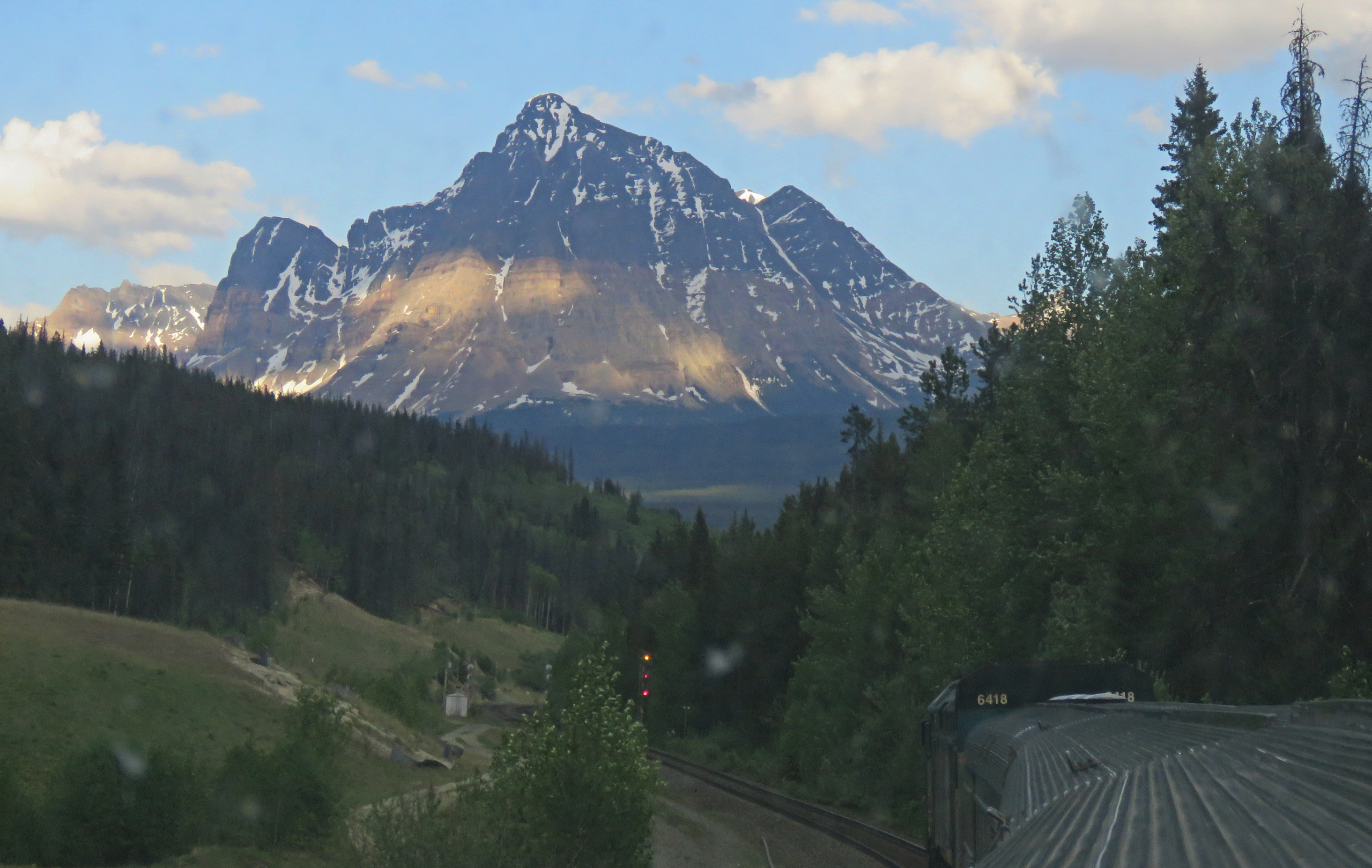
Mount Fitzwilliam seen from train

== See also ==
- List of mountains in the Canadian Rockies
- Geography of British Columbia
