= Vista Peak =

Mountain in Canada

- Location within Alberta Location within British Columbia Location within Canada

Highest point
- Elevation: 2,795 m (9,170 ft)
- Prominence: 513 m (1,683 ft)
- Parent peak: Basilica Mountain (2899 m)
- Listing: Mountains of Alberta; Mountains of British Columbia
- Coordinates: 52°45′56″N 118°24′15″W

Geography
- Country: Canada
- Provinces: Alberta and British Columbia
- District: Cariboo Land District
- Protected areas: Mount Robson Provincial Park; Jasper National Park
- Parent range: Park Ranges
- Topo map: NTS 83D16 Jasper

Climbing
- First ascent: 1917 Interprovincial Boundary Commission

Vista Peak is located near the head of Rockingham Creek, south of Yellowhead Pass in Mount Robson Provincial Park on the Continental Divide marking the Alberta-British Columbia border. It was named in 1917, the name refers to the view from the peak of the mountain.

== See also ==
- List of peaks on the Alberta–British Columbia border
