= Muhigan Mountain =

Mountain in Jasper National Park, Canada

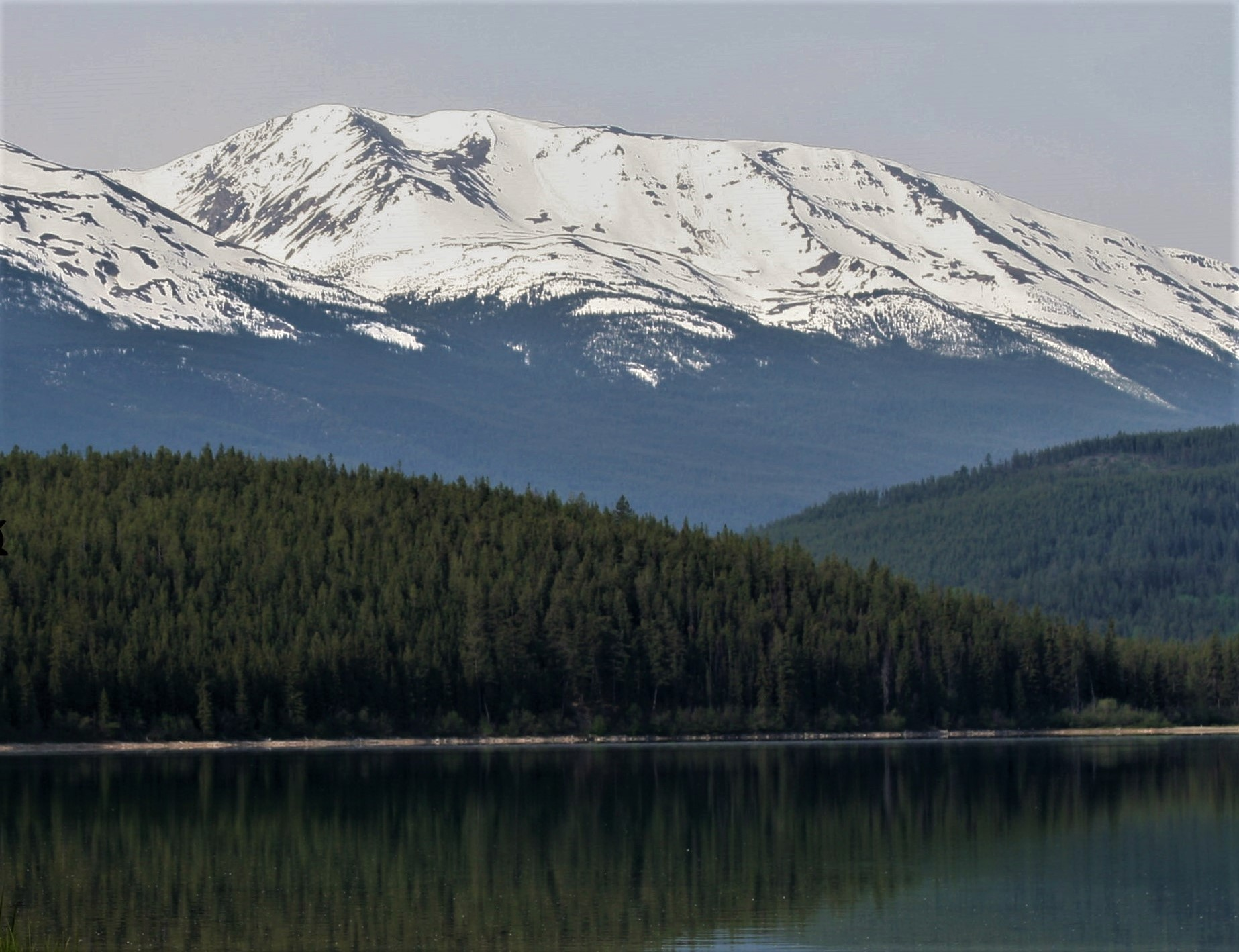
- Northeast aspect, from Patricia Lake

Highest point
- Elevation: 2,626 m (8,615 ft)
- Prominence: 156 m (512 ft)
- Isolation: 4.11 km (2.55 mi)
- Listing: Mountains of Alberta
- Coordinates: 52°49′35″N 118°13′30″W

Naming
- Etymology: "Wolf" Mountain

Geography
- Location within Alberta Location within Canada
- Interactive map of Muhigan Mountain
- Country: Canada
- Province: Alberta
- Protected area: Jasper National Park
- Parent range: Trident Range; Canadian Rockies
- Topo map: NTS 83D16 Jasper

Muhigan Mountain is a 2,626-metre (8,615 ft) mountain located in Alberta, Canada.

== Description ==
The mountain is set within Jasper National Park, in the Trident Range of the Canadian Rockies. The town of Jasper is situated 11 kilometres (6.8 mi) to the east-northeast, The Whistlers is 6.2 kilometres (3.9 mi) to the east, Indian Ridge is 4.8 km (3.0 mi) to the east-southeast and the Continental Divide is 12 kilometres (7.5 mi) to the west. The peak is composed of sedimentary rock laid down from the Precambrian to the Jurassic periods and pushed east and over the top of younger rock during the Laramide orogeny. Precipitation runoff from Muhigan Mountain drains into tributaries of the Miette River. Topographic relief is significant as the summit rises 1,575 meters (5,167 feet) above the river in four kilometers (2.5 miles).

== History ==
The mountain was named in 1916 by Morrison P. Bridgland, and the word "muhigan" is Indigenous, meaning "wolf". In Cree language, the mountain is called "Mahikan Wachi" (Wolf Mountain). Bridgland (1878–1948), was a Dominion Land Surveyor who named many peaks in Jasper Park and the Canadian Rockies. The mountain's toponym was officially adopted in 1951 by the Geographical Names Board of Canada.

== Climate ==
Based on the Köppen climate classification, Muhigan Mountain is located in a subarctic climate zone with cold, snowy winters, and mild summers. Winter temperatures can drop below −20 °C (−4 °F) with wind chill factors below −30 °C (−22 °F).

== Gallery ==
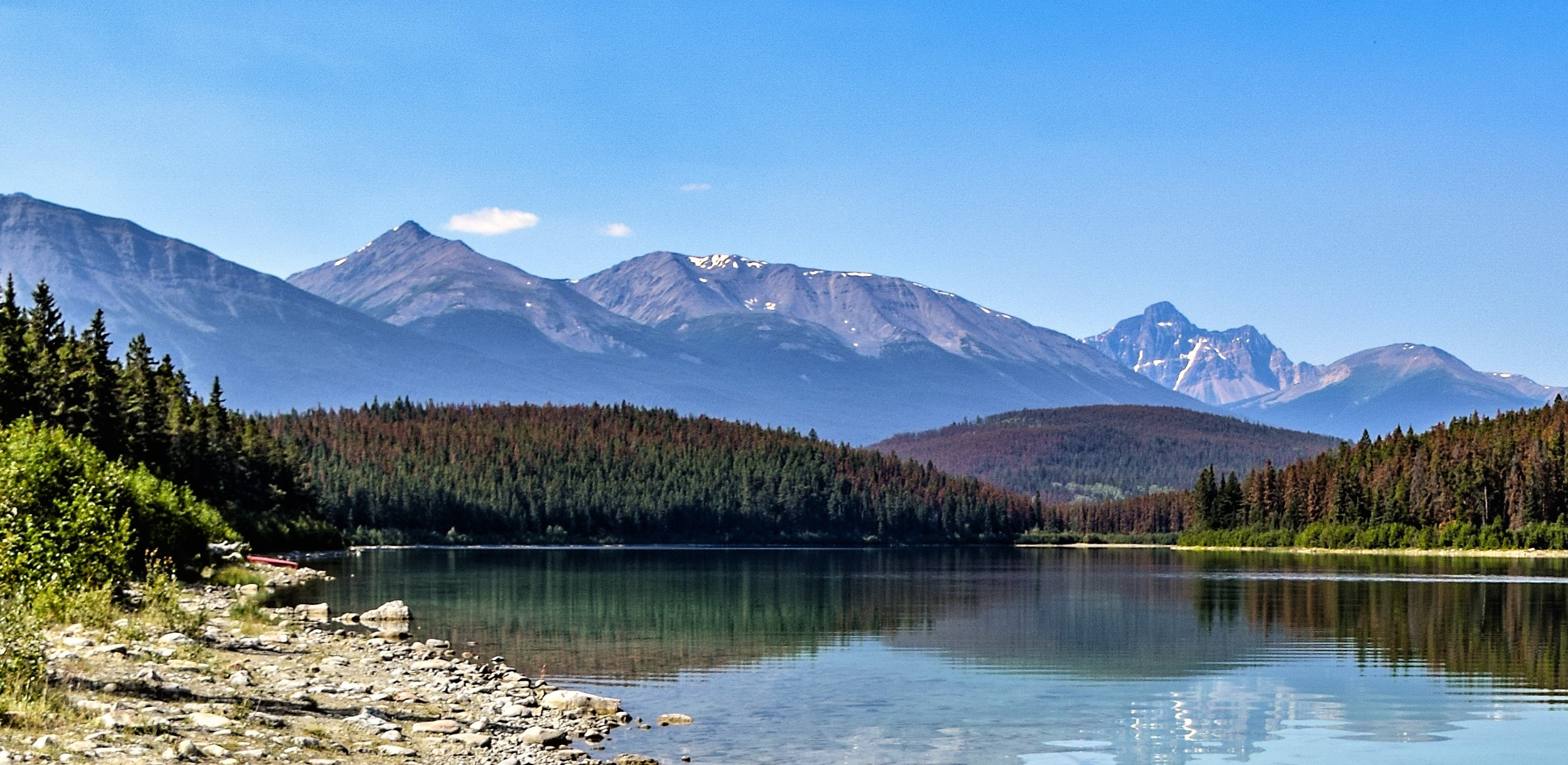
Muhigan Mountain (center) from Patricia Lake, with Roche Noire to right.

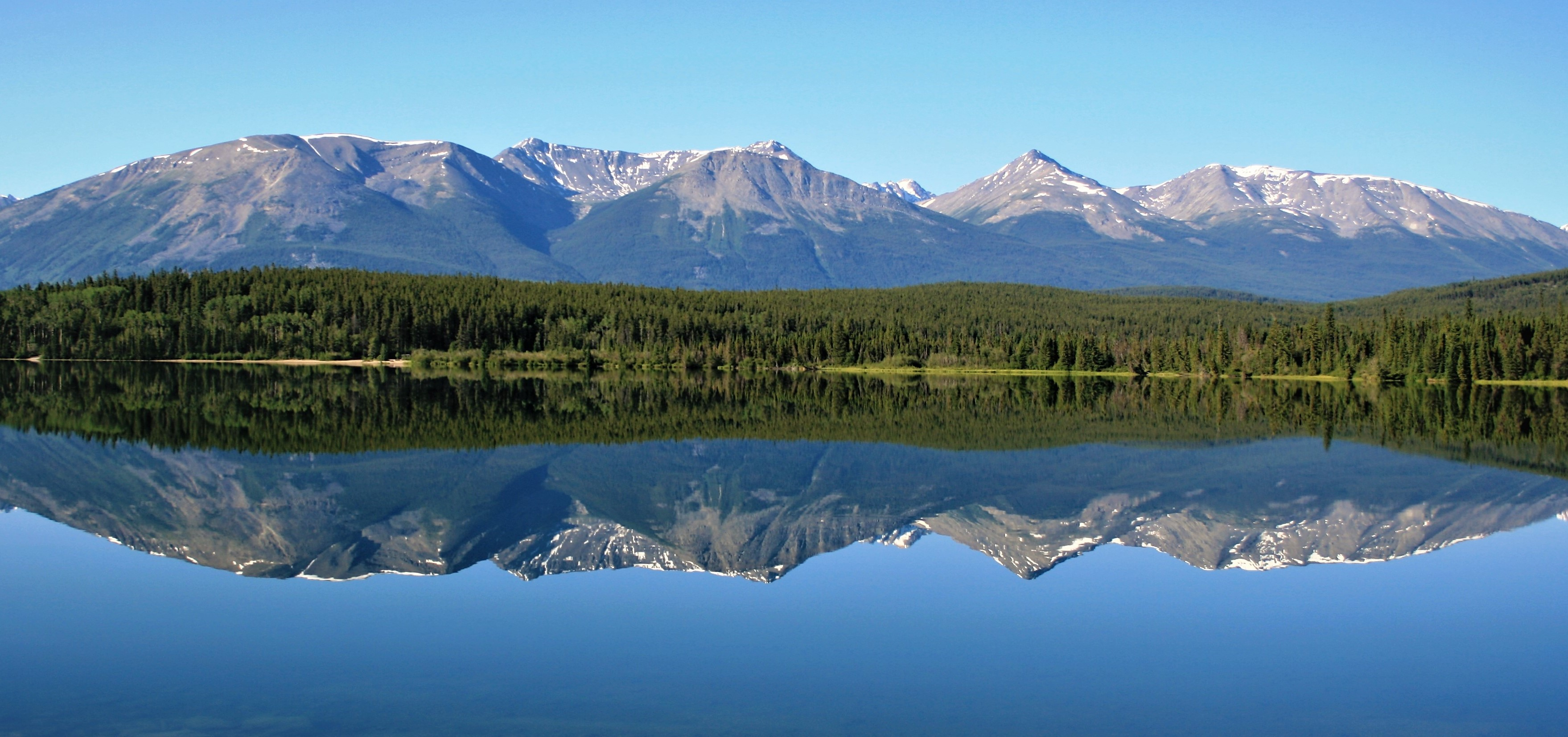
The Trident Range reflected in Pyramid Lake.
Left to rightː The Whistlers, Indian Ridge, Muhigan Mountain.

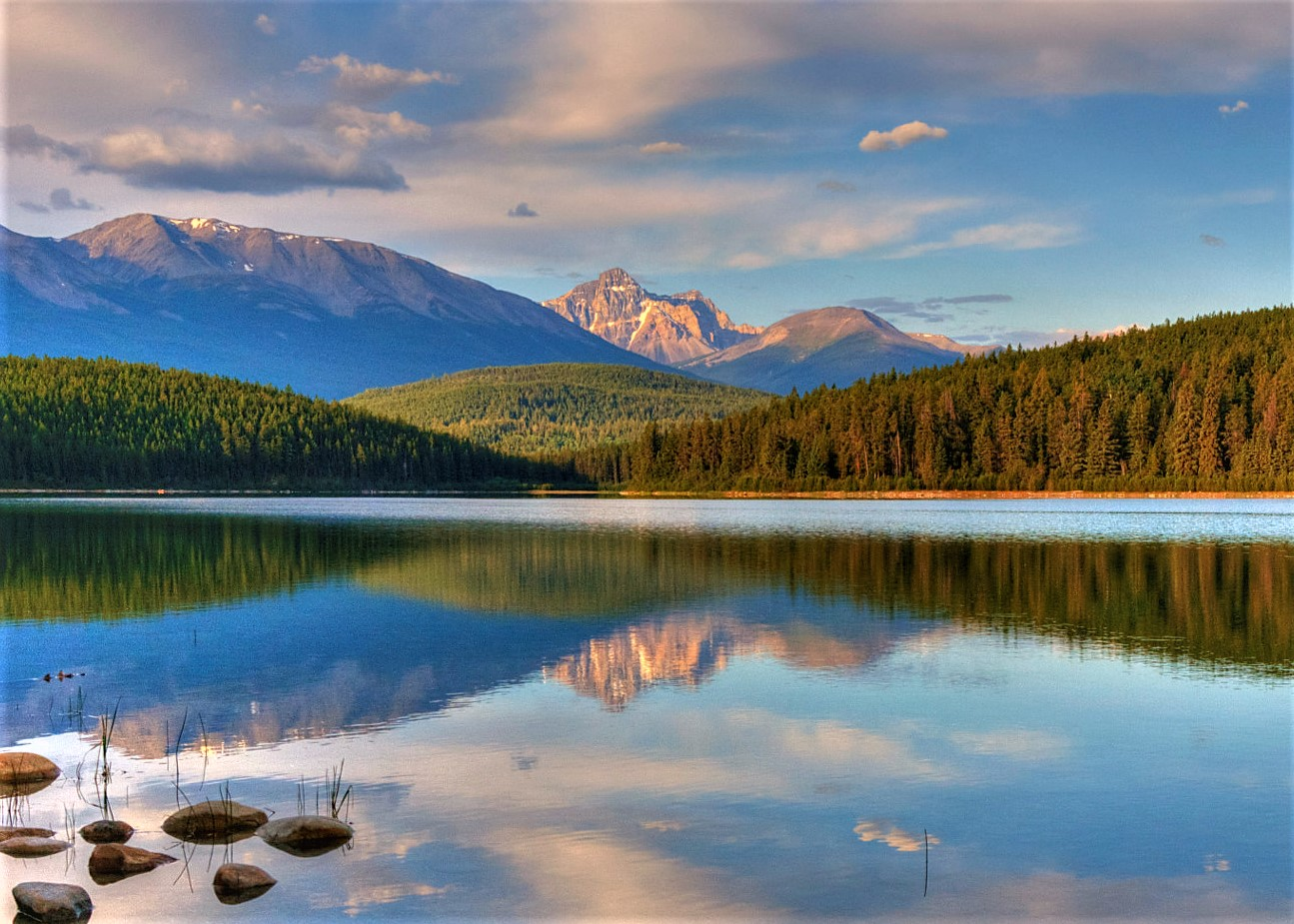
Muhigan Mountain (left) and Roche Noire (center) reflected in Patricia Lake

== See also ==
- Geography of Alberta
