= Basilica Mountain =

Mountain in Alberta, Canada

- Location within Alberta Location within Canada

Highest point
- Elevation: 2,899 m (9,511 ft)
- Prominence: 321 m (1,053 ft)
- Parent peak: Roche Noire (2921 m)
- Listing: Mountains of Alberta
- Coordinates: 52°48′20″N 118°20′32″W

Geography
- Country: Canada
- Province: Alberta
- Parent range: Park Ranges
- Topo map: NTS 83D16 Jasper

Basilica Mountain is a summit in Alberta, Canada located between Clairvaux Creek and Meadow Creek.

Basilica Mountain was so named on account of its basilica-shaped outline.

== See also ==
- List of mountains in the Canadian Rockies
