= Lady Mabel Fitzwilliam =

English socialist politician

Lady Mabel Florence Harriet Wentworth-Fitzwilliam (14 July 1870 – 26 September 1951) was an English socialist politician, later known as Lady Mabel Smith.

== Biography ==
Her father was William Wentworth Fitzwilliam, Viscount Milton, the eldest son of William Wentworth-FitzWilliam, 6th Earl FitzWilliam. Her father died before inheriting the Earldom and it passed to her brother, William Wentworth-FitzWilliam, 7th Earl FitzWilliam whose lifestyle she criticised; "he had so much and everyone else had so little".

She married Lt. Col. William Mackenzie Smith on 29 July 1899 and went to live in Barnes Hall near Grenoside, Sheffield. After her marriage she was known as Lady Mabel Smith.

She was a local politician in south Yorkshire, firstly as a West Riding County Councillor and later as a county Alderman and member of the Workers' Educational Authority.

In 1918 she visited France as Inspector of Yorkshire's Women's Agricultural Auxiliary Corps.

She served on the Departmental Committee on Public Libraries which was appointed by the then President of the Board of Education Charles Trevelyan in 1924, reporting in June, 1927 and was appointed a member of the Adult Education Committee set up by the then President of the Board of Education Eustace Percy in 1927 She served on the Labour Party National Executive Committee in 1932. and 1934

She assisted greatly in the establishment of Ecclesfield Grammar School in the early 1930s, and after its great expansion in the early 1950s its new Assembly Hall, opened in 1953, was named Lady Mabel Hall.

She was a committed Christian and social worker. She stated that her social conscience developed after seeing the conditions of children who lived on the Wentworth estate. Lady Mabel's niece, Joyce Smith, described her as a "rabid socialist" whose name was "absolutely taboo" at Wentworth Woodhouse. In 1910 she contributed £1.1s. to the £100,000 Fund of the suffragette Women's Social and Political Union, according to its organ, Votes for Women.

From 1949 to 1974, Wentworth Woodhouse was changed into a College of Physical Education, for this period the college was named after Lady Mabel, as she had brokered the deal for its establishment, allowing the family to maintain private apartments. The college trained female physical education teachers. The college later merged with Sheffield City Polytechnic and the name Wentworth Woodhouse was restored.
