= Walter Butler Cheadle =

English paediatrician

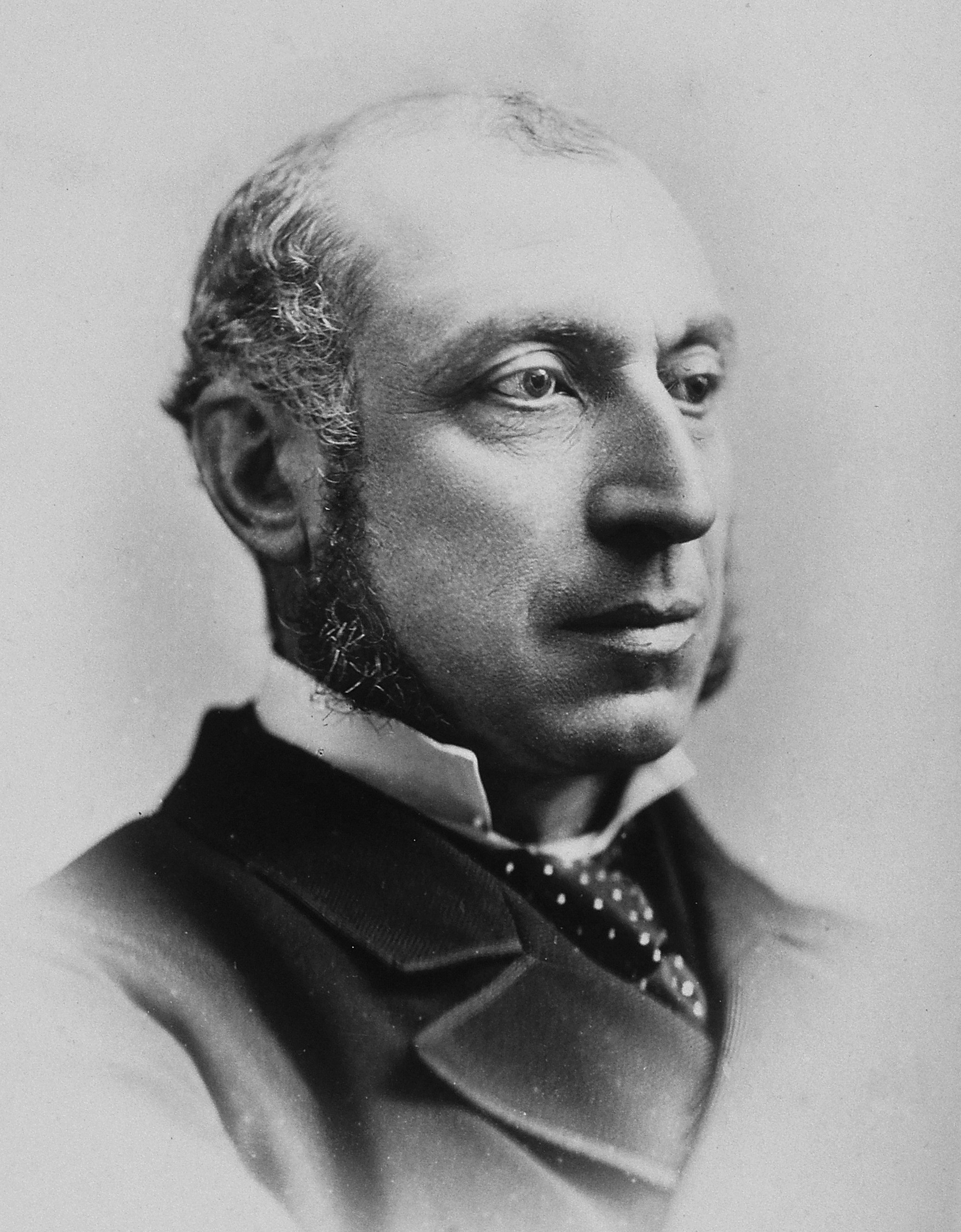
Walter Butler Cheadle in 1881

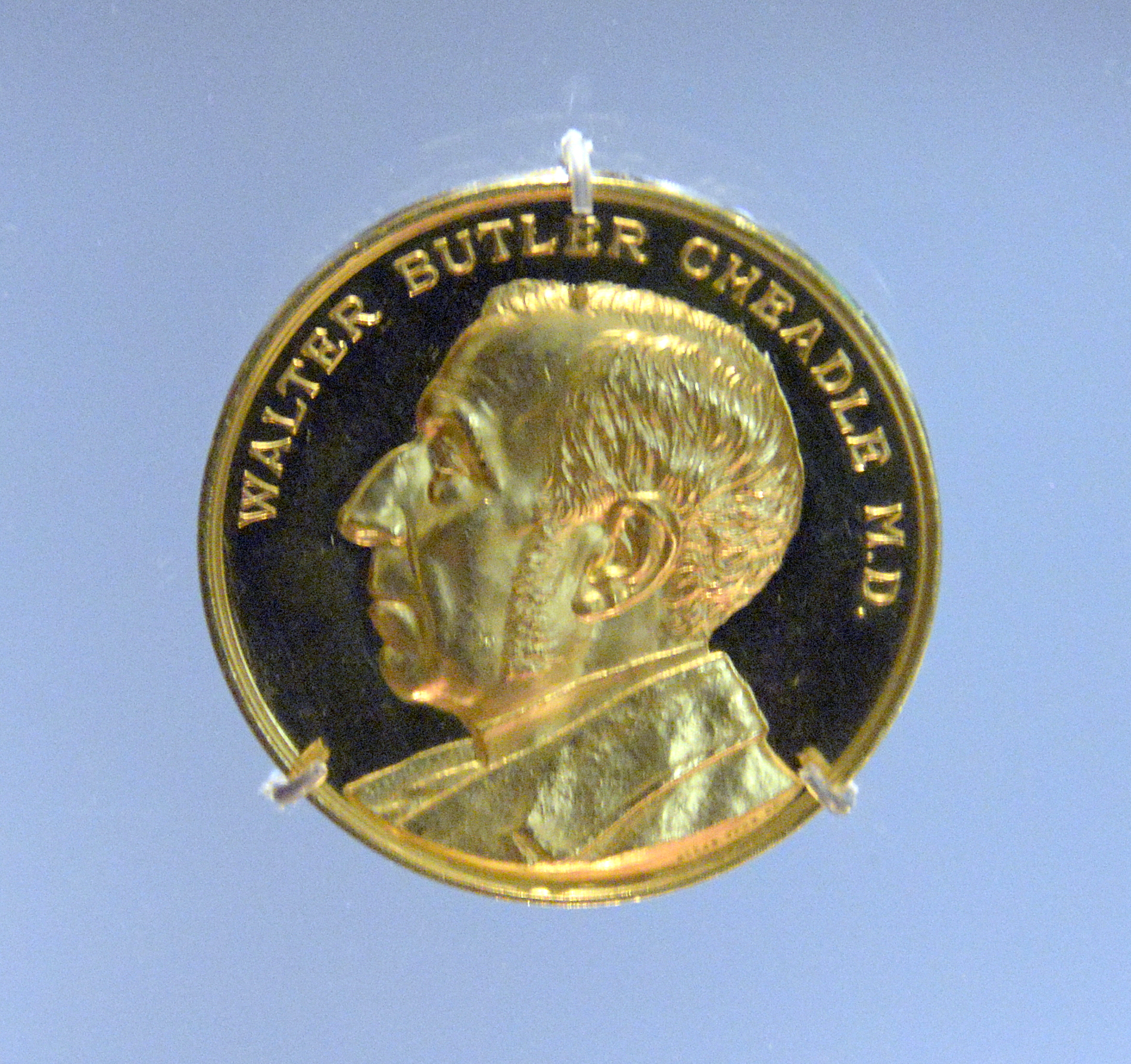
Walter Butler Cheadle Gold Medal, 1908. Awarded to Sir Alexander Fleming. National Museum of Scotland, Edinburgh

Walter Butler Cheadle (October 1836, Colne, Lancashire – 22 March 1910, London) was an English paediatrician.

Cheadle was educated at Caius College, Cambridge, graduating M.B. in 1861 and then studied medicine at St George's Hospital Medical School in London. He interrupted his studies in 1861 to join Lord Milton on an expedition to explore Western Canada (1862–1864), and then on to China.

Arriving in Quebec City in July 1862, they travelled across the continent, wintering near Fort Carlton. After a challenging and at times humorous summer they reached Victoria, BC.

Together with William Fitzwilliam (Viscount Milton), Cheadle travelled up the Athabasca River and in 1863 they became the first "tourists" to travel through the Yellowhead Pass. On returning home, with Milton, he co-authored a book on their adventures, The North-West Passage by Land (London, 1865), which described their expedition in considerable detail, which gained a lot of attention.

He continued his medical studies and received his doctorate in 1865, became assistant at the St Mary's Hospital (London) in 1866 and from 1869 he was, for 23 years, at the Hospital for Sick Children, Great Ormond Street, where he was dean of the medical faculty from 1869 to 1873. At the time of his death he was consulting physician at the St. Mary's Hospital. He was an ardent advocate of women in the study of medicine.

Cheadle published the first observation on acute rachitis after J. O. L. Möller, calling the disease infantile scurvy. He distinguished scurvy from rickets in 1878.

Cheadle practised medicine in London and served as dean of St. Mary's Hospital Medical School in the University of London from 1869 to 1873.

Mount Cheadle, which is located in the Monashee Range of British Columbia, on the east flank of the North Thompson River, 25 km north of Blue River, is named after Cheadle. The hamlet of Cheadle, located in Southern Alberta 20 km east of Calgary, was also named after Cheadle. The town was named by the Canadian Pacific Railway and established in 1902.
