= Roche Noire (Alberta) =

Mountain in the country of Canada

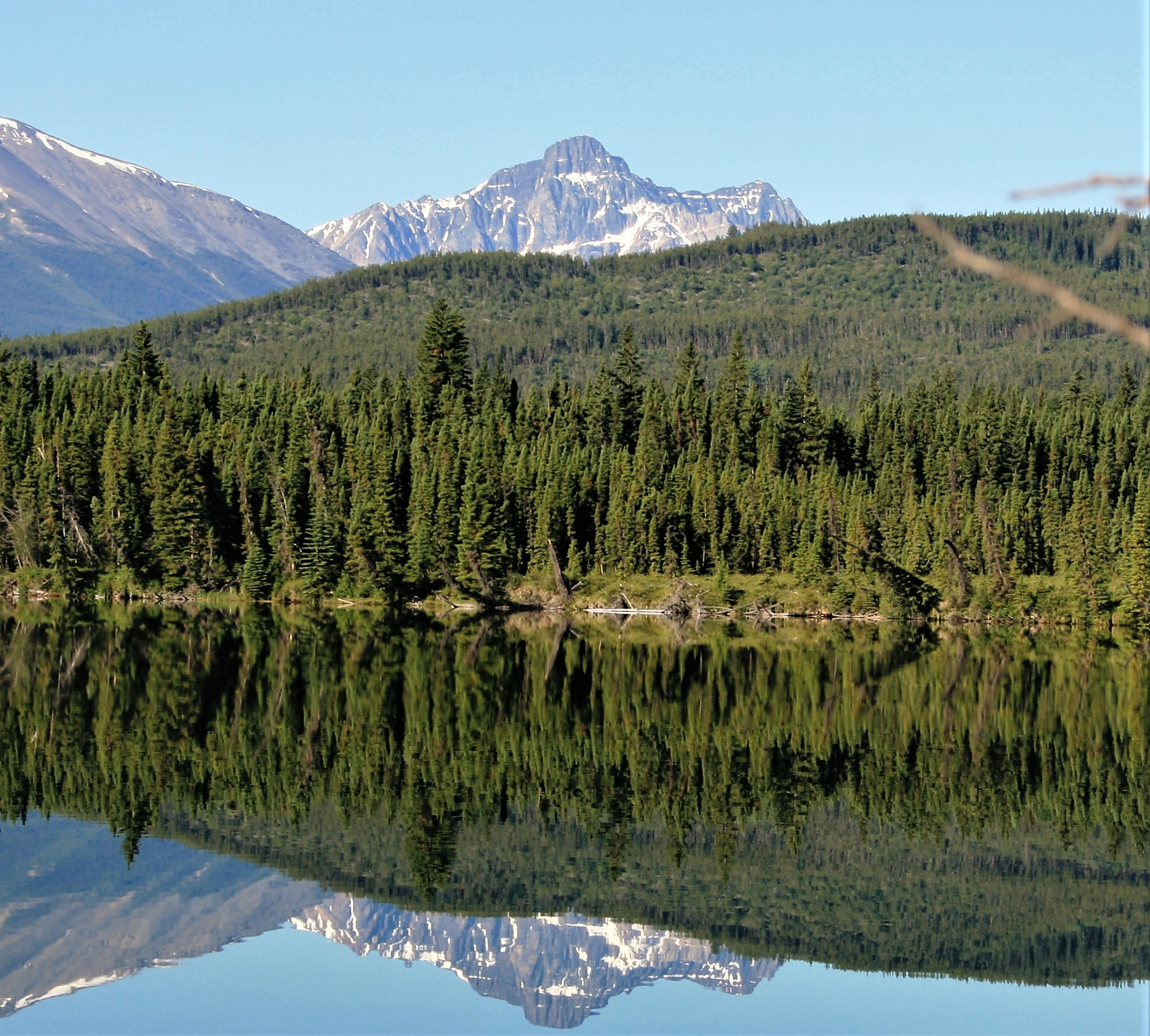
- Northeast aspect reflected in Pyramid Lake

Highest point
- Elevation: 2,920 m (9,580 ft)
- Prominence: 960 m (3,150 ft)
- Isolation: 8.92 km (5.54 mi)
- Listing: Mountains of Alberta
- Coordinates: 52°48′53″N 118°19′03″W

Geography
- Location within Alberta Location within Canada
- Interactive map of Roche Noire
- Country: Canada
- Province: Alberta
- Protected area: Jasper National Park
- Parent range: Trident Range; Canadian Rockies
- Topo map: NTS 83D16 Jasper

Roche Noire is a 2,920-metre (9,580 ft) mountain located in Alberta, Canada.

== Description ==
The mountain is set within Jasper National Park, in the Trident Range of the Canadian Rockies. The town of Jasper is situated 18 kilometres (11 mi) to the east-northeast, Muhigan Mountain is 6 kilometres (3.7 mi) to the east, and the Continental Divide is 6 kilometres (3.7 mi) to the west. The peak is composed of sedimentary rock laid down from the Precambrian to the Jurassic periods and pushed east and over the top of younger rock during the Laramide orogeny. Precipitation runoff from Roche Noire drains into tributaries of the Miette River. Topographic relief is significant as the summit rises 1,400 meters (4,593 feet) above Meadow Creek in three kilometers (1.9 mile).

== History ==
The mountain was named in 1916 by Morrison P. Bridgland, and the words "Roche Noire" are French, meaning "black rock", referring to the color of the summit. Bridgland (1878–1948), was a Dominion Land Surveyor who named many peaks in Jasper Park and the Canadian Rockies. The mountain's toponym was officially adopted February 7, 1951, by the Geographical Names Board of Canada.

== Climate ==
Based on the Köppen climate classification, Roche Noire is located in a subarctic climate zone with cold, snowy winters, and mild summers. Winter temperatures can drop below −20 °C (−4 °F) with wind chill factors below −30 °C (−22 °F).

== Gallery ==
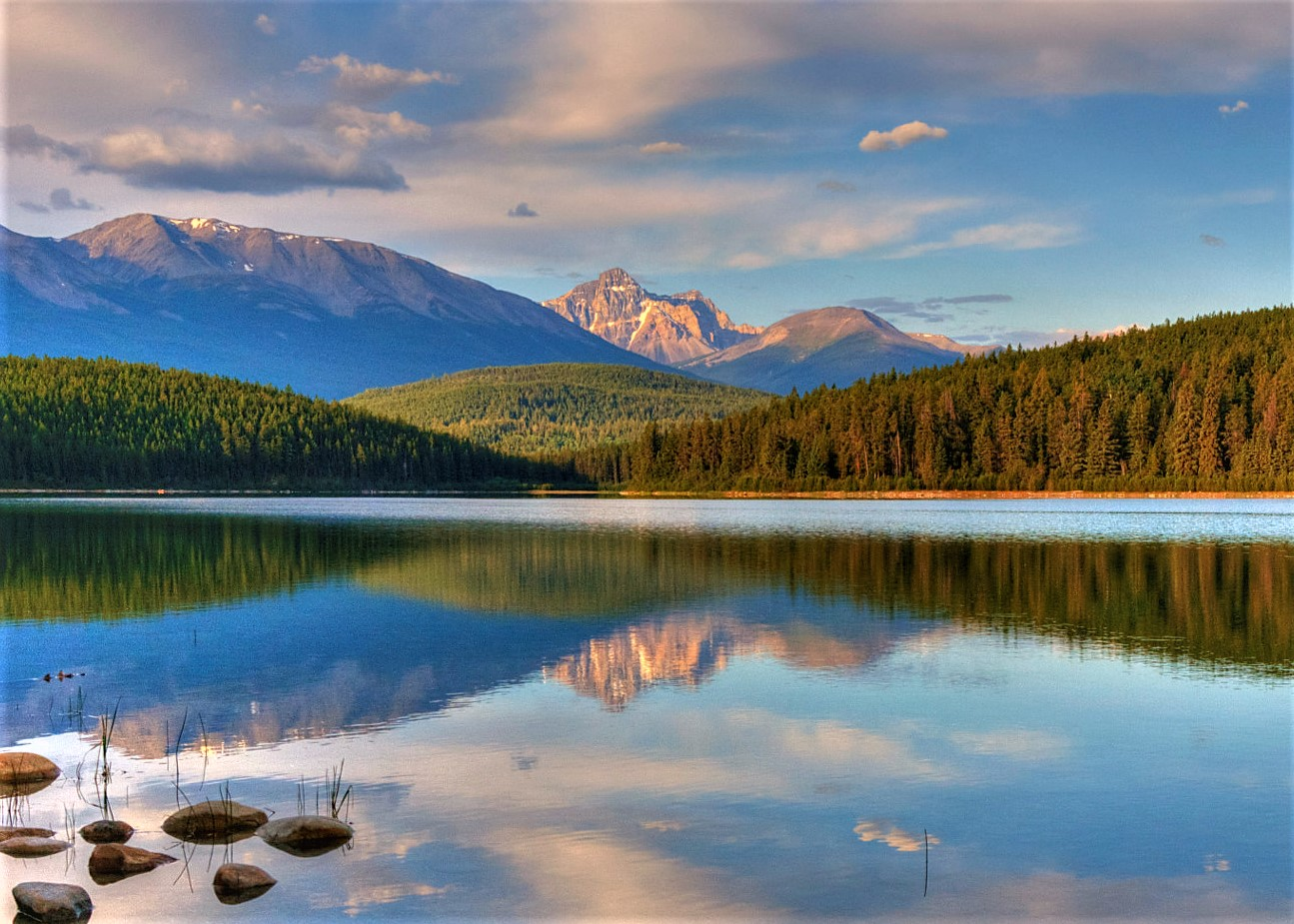
Roche Noire from Patricia Lake

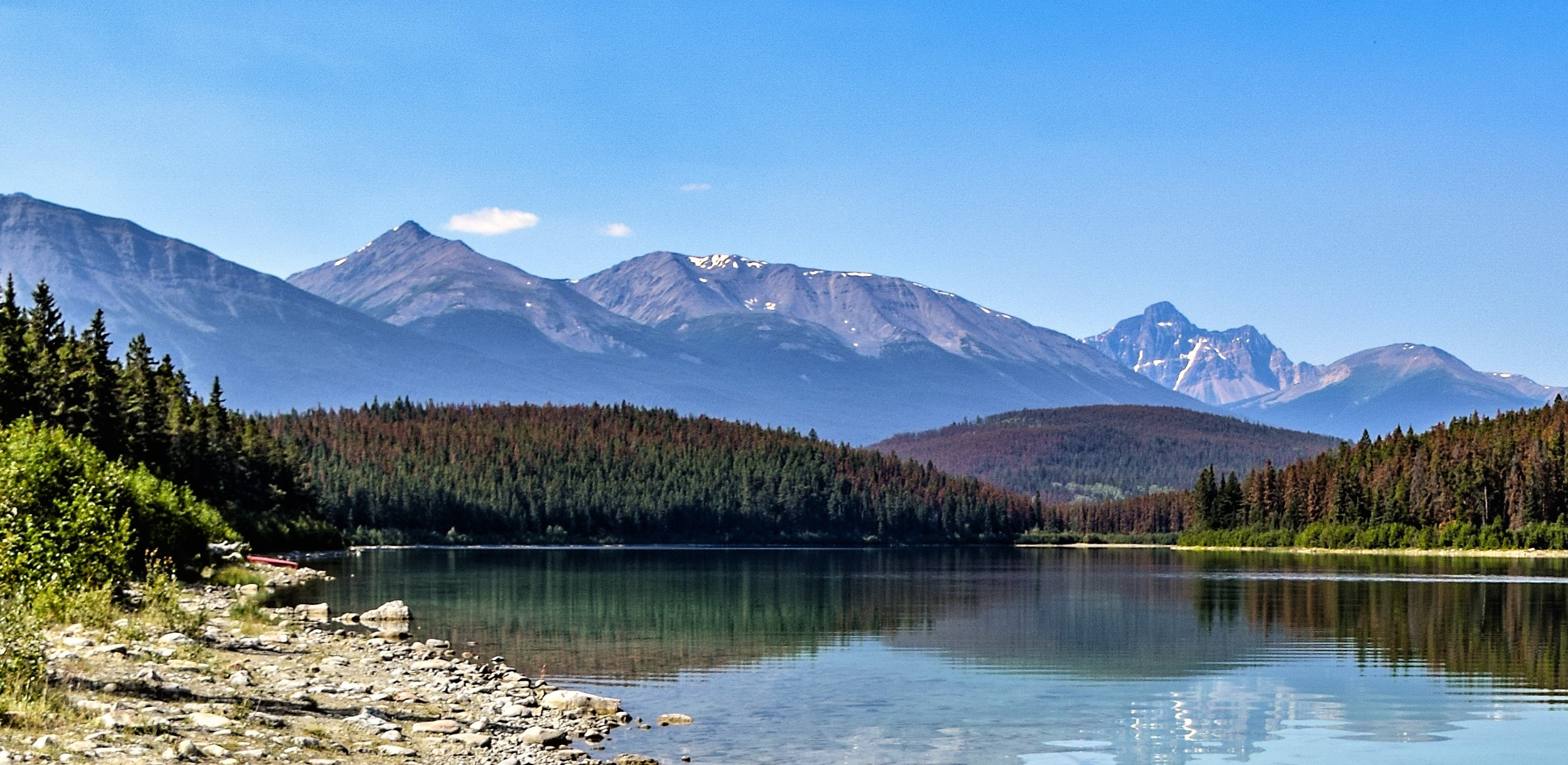
Muhigan Mountain (center) seen from Patricia Lake, with Roche Noire to right.

== See also ==
- Geography of Alberta
