= Sargood =

Sargood is a surname. Notable people with the surname include:

- Frederick James Sargood (1805–1873), politician in colonial Victoria, a member of the Legislative Council and Assembly
- Frederick Thomas Sargood (1834–1903), Australian politician, Victorian minister and Australian senator; son of above
- Percy Sargood (1865–1940), New Zealand businessman and philanthropist
- Richard Sargood (1888–1979), British trade unionist and Labour Party politician

== See also ==
- Allgood (disambiguation)
- Hargood (disambiguation)
