= Hargood =

Hargood may refer to:

- William Hargood (1762-1839), British naval officer
- HMS Hargood, two British Royal Navy ships
- USS Hargood, two United States Navy ships
