= Leake and Watts Services =

Social services agency in New York City

Coordinates: 40°48′09″N 73°57′46″W

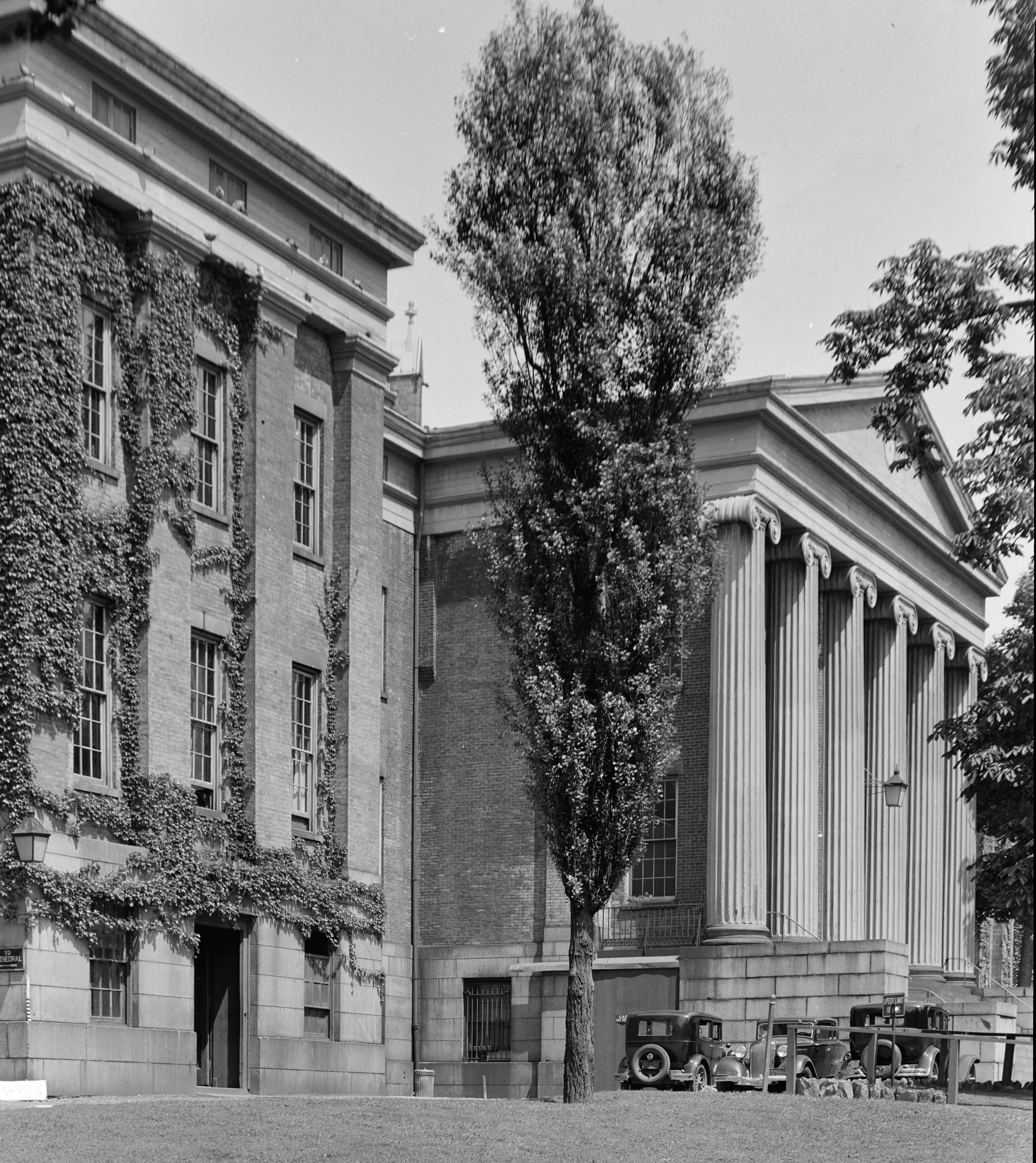
The original Leake and Watts Orphanage on Amsterdam Avenue, photographed here in 1934 after acquisition by the Cathedral of St. John the Divine

Leake and Watts Services, Inc. is a not-for-profit social services agency in New York City that provides services for children and families in the areas of foster care, adoption, special education, Head Start and other related subjects. It has facilities in Yonkers in Westchester County, New York, and in the Bronx and upper Manhattan in New York City. The agency began as the Leake and Watts Orphan Asylum in Manhattan.

In 2018, Leake and Watts Services was rebranded as Rising Ground. A description of the organization today is available at Rising Ground.

== History ==
John George Leake (1752–1827) was a New York lawyer who had no children or siblings. He died on June 2, 1827, at his home on Park Row in Manhattan. His estate, which included personal property valued at about $300,000 and real estate worth an additional $86,000, he left to Robert Watts, the son of his best friend John Watts, with the stipulation that Robert Watts change his name to "Robert Leake". Watts made the change, but died a few months later, leaving no will. The Leake fortune would then have passed to his father, John Watts, but considering the circumstances Watts was uncomfortable with receiving the money.

In the legal papers of John Leake was an unsigned and undated draft of a will in his handwriting, in which he left money to create a home for orphaned children, and assigned his friend, John Watts, to administer the home. Watts petitioned the court to put the money to this use. The Public Administrator of New York took charge of the estate, ruling that Leake had died intestate. After a court decision the cash was released to the orphanage but his real estate was kept by New York State.

Originally located at Trinity Church, a new building for the orphanage at West 112th Street in Morningside Heights, Manhattan, was completed in 1843, designed by Ithiel Town and constructed by Samuel Thomson in the Greek Revival style. The site of the orphanage was purchased in 1891 by Bishop Henry Codman Potter for the Cathedral of St. John the Divine, and the building was to be torn down. However, the building was preserved as part of the cathedral close, renovated in 2006, and is the oldest building still standing in Morningside Heights.

The Leake & Watts Board of Trustees purchased a 40-acre in Yonkers, New York, in 1888. In 1890 the orphanage opened in Yonkers.

In 2012, a 16-year-old student named Corey Foster died at Leake and Watts while being restrained by the institution's staff after refusing to leave the basketball court. The institute's practices, which include solitary confinement and punitive restraints, have been criticized. However, the Westchester County District Attorney led a three-month investigation into the incidence and concluded that no criminal charges were warranted.

In 2018, Leake & Watts changed its name to Rising Ground.

== Timeline ==
- 1827 – Death of Leake
- 1831 – Leake & Watts Orphan House is founded in New York City for "the maintenance and education of helpless orphan children" by John Watts, according to the terms of a bequest by his brother-in-law, John George Leake.
- 1838 – Cornerstone for new building laid
- 1843 – The Leake & Watts Orphan House moves to the current site of the Cathedral of St. John the Divine in Upper Manhattan.
- 1850 – Leake & Watts Orphan House opens its doors to girls.
- 1890 – The Home is moved outside the city to the 40-acre (160,000 m^{2}) farm of Edwin Forrest, the grounds were designed by Frederick Law Olmsted.
- 1921 – The "cottage system" is implemented at Leake & Watts. First implemented for girls, the system featured six cottages with cottage parents, housing 10-30 girls each on the Yonkers campus.
- 1937 – A Social Services Department with trained social work staff is established.
- 1944 – The Foster Home Department is established.
- 1947 – Leake & Watts merges with the Orphan Home and Asylum of the Episcopal Church and the Sevilla-Hopewell Society of Brooklyn.
- General source:
