= Edwin Gould =

American railroad executive (1866–1933)

Edwin Gould Sr.
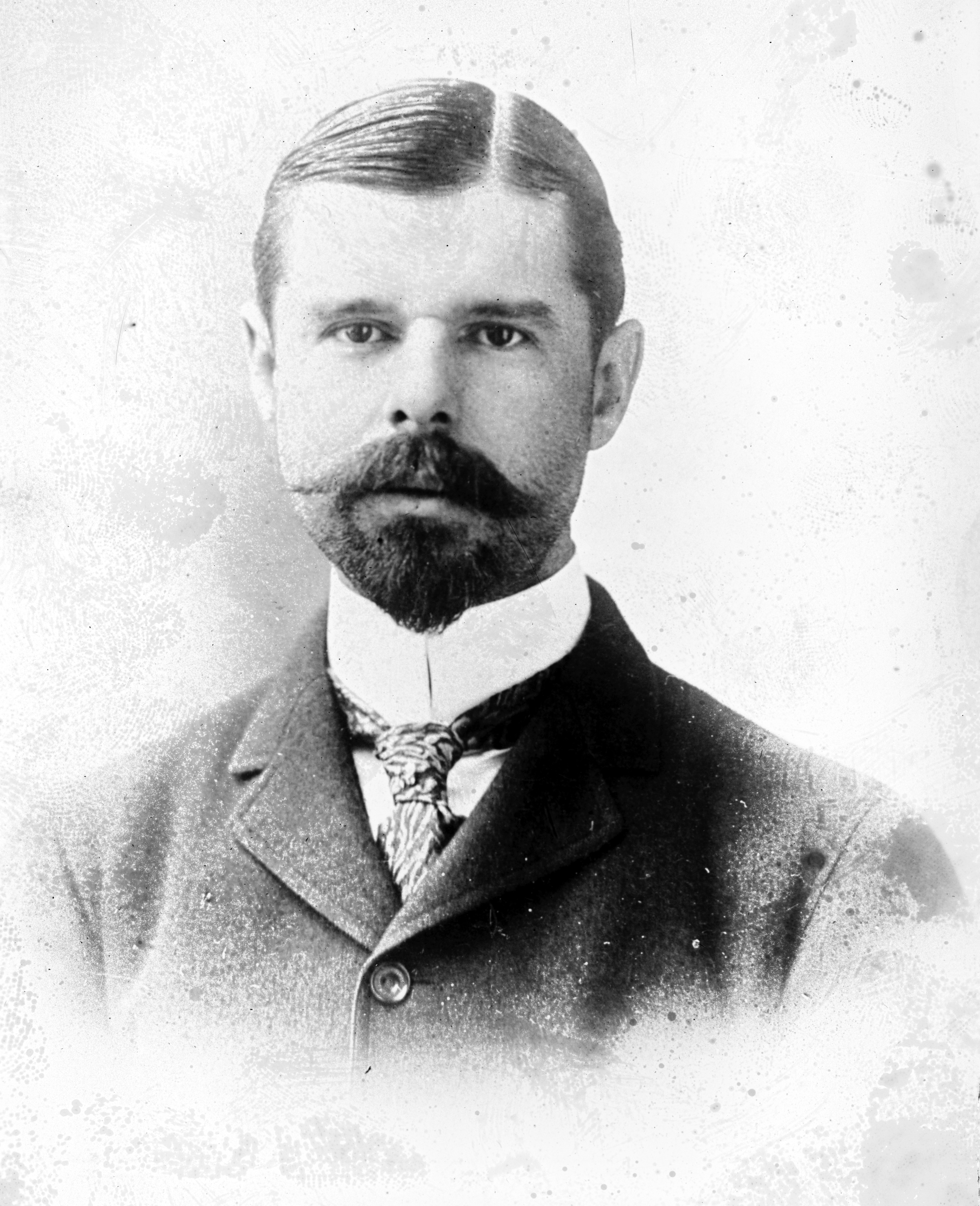
- Born: February 26, 1866; New York City, US
- Died: July 12, 1933 (aged 67); Oyster Bay Cove, New York, US
- Education: Columbia School of Mines
- Spouse: Sarah Cantine Shrady (m. 1892)
- Children: 2
- Parent(s): Jay Gould; Helen Day Miller
- Relatives: Siblings: George Jay Gould; Helen Gould; Howard Gould; Anna Gould; Frank Jay Gould

Edwin Gould Sr. (February 26, 1866 – July 12, 1933) was an American railway official, investor, philanthropist, and member of the wealthy Gould family.

== Early life ==
Gould was born in Manhattan, New York City, to railroad financier Jay Gould on February 26, 1866. Time magazine writes on July 24, 1933:

His brothers and sisters, save for Helen, all insisted on marrying actresses or noblemen — generally more than once. His sister Anna divorced Count Boni de Castellane and married the Duc de Talleyrand. His brother Howard (now living abroad) married Actress Viola Katherine Clemmons and separated from her. His brother Frank Jay Gould (now settled on the Riviera as owner of Nice's unprofitable Casino) married Margaret Kelly, a banker's daughter, then British Actress Edith Kelly, then French Actress Florence La Caze. His elder brother George had married Actress Edith Kingdon, by whom he had seven children, and after her death in 1921 married British Actress Guinevere Sinclair, legitimatizing three other children he had had by her. ... But he modestly went his way, made and gave away his modest millions, died without ostentation, of a sudden heart attack.

He studied at Columbia University and was a member of the class of 1888 in the Columbia School of Mines. In 1896, he donated $18,000 to fund the crew team's boathouse, which is still named in his honor.

== Career ==
From 1917 to 1918, during World War I, he served with Squadron A, New York National Guard. In 1918, he was major of ordnance in the First Brigade of the New York Guard. He was chosen a captain in the 71st Regiment of the New York State Guard.

He served as secretary of the St. Louis, Arkansas, and Texas Railway until it was reorganized as the St. Louis Southwestern Railway and later served as vice-president and president of the St. Louis Southwestern Railway. He organized the Continental Match Company in 1894 (consolidated with the Diamond Match Company in 1899). He was president of the Bowling Green Trust Company and vice-president of the American Writing Paper Company and president of the Five Boroughs Realty Company. He also served as a director of many railroad and other corporations before his retirement in 1926.

== Personal life ==
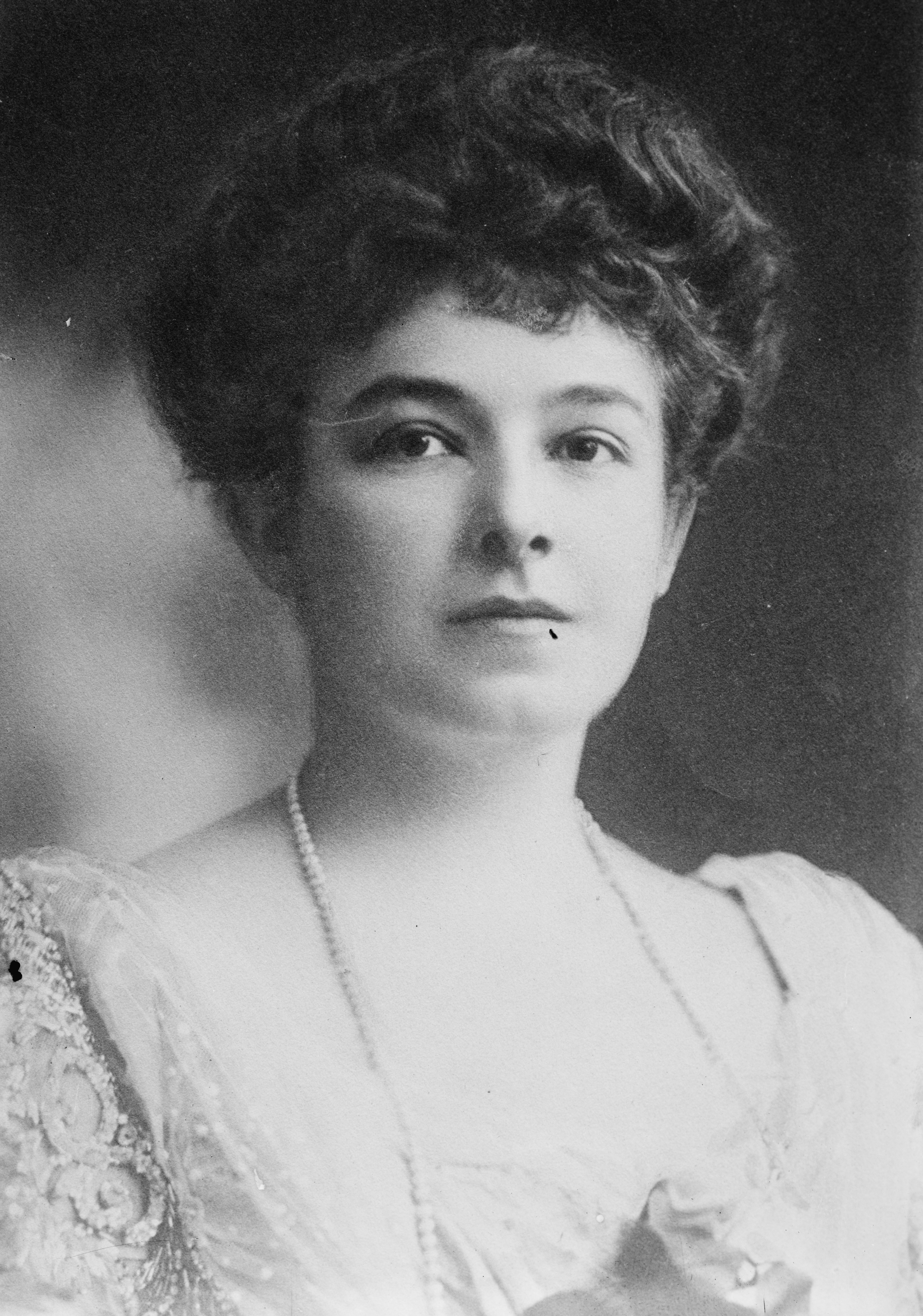
Photograph of his wife, Sarah Cantine Shrady

For many years, Gould lived in Dobbs Ferry, on a huge estate, Agawam, that sat along the Hudson River. Gould was a generous benefactor to the small village, and one of his contributions, Gould Park, remains an important recreational site for village residents. He was also a very active member of the Jekyll Island Club on Jekyll Island, Georgia, along with J.P. Morgan and William Rockefeller among others. In 1900, Gould purchased the former cottage of David H. King Jr., "a single-storied, Italian Renaissance house surrounding a central courtyard, complete with a swimming pool fed by an artesian well."

On October 26, 1892, Gould married Sarah Cantine Shrady (c. 1870–1951), stepdaughter of the prominent physician George Frederick Shrady Sr., another member of the Jekyll Island Club. Together, they had two sons:

- Edwin Gould Jr. (1894–1917), who died following a freak hunting accident on Jekyll Island at the age of 23.
- Frank Miller Gould (c. 1895–1945), who married Florence Amelia Bacon in 1924. They divorced in Reno in 1944 and Frank remarried to Helen Dolores (née Roosen) Curran at Macon, Georgia, on June 7, 1944, shortly before his death in 1945.

Gould died on July 12, 1933. After his dinner he complained of not feeling well, and died after midnight in his bed, at his estate Highwood in Oyster Bay Cove, New York. He was buried in the family mausoleum in Woodlawn Cemetery. Upon his death, his widow reportedly inherited $10 million.

=== Descendants ===
Through his son Frank, he was a grandfather of Marianne Gould (1926–1957), who married (and later divorced) Lt. John W. McDonough, and New York real estate investor Edwin Jay Gould (1932–1993).

=== Legacy ===
Much like his famous sister, Helen Miller Gould Shepard, Edwin was a prominent philanthropist. He was known for his avoidance of grand public displays and his focus on the welfare of young people, prompted by the untimely death of his son. In 1923, through a special act of the New York Legislature, he established the Edwin Gould Foundation for Children whose work laid foundational support for numerous successful nonprofits and community services in areas of early childhood education, foster care, and workforce training for women. In 2018, Edwin Gould Services for Children and Families merged with Rising Ground, a leading human services nonprofit.
