= Niagara (yacht) =

Racing sloop built in 1895

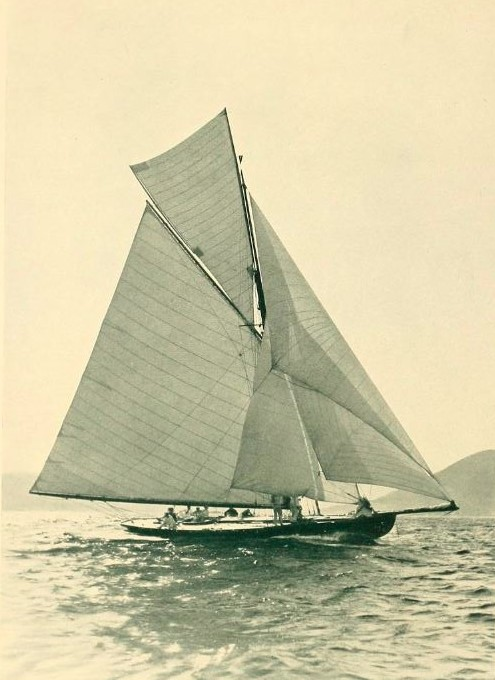
- Name: Niagara
- Owner: Howard Gould
- Builder: Herreshoff Manufacturing Company
- Launched: April 16, 1895
- Status: Private yacht
- Class & type: Sloop
- Length: 65 ft (20 m)
- Beam: 12 ft (3.7 m)
- Draft: 10.75 ft (3.28 m)

Niagara was a 65-foot (20 m) long sloop built in 1895 by the Herreshoff Manufacturing Company in Bristol, Rhode Island for New Yorker Howard Gould.

== Construction ==
The Niagara was built in 1895 by the Herreshoff Manufacturing Company in Bristol, Rhode Island for $12,500 for prominent New York financier, Howard Gould, a son Jay Gould, the enormously wealthy railroad magnate and financial speculator. She was built at the same time as the other Herreshoff flier, Isolde, to challenge Lord Dunraven's Audrey.

=== Racing history ===
During her first racing season of 1895, the Niagara participated in roughly fifty races of the leading yacht clubs of Great Britain. Her skipper was John Barr, the former commander of the Thistle, and a crew, which included sailors from the United States and Norway. She won twenty-nine first prizes, nine second prizes, and one third prize. She was in the twenty-rating class and sailed the Royal Thames Yacht Club regatta in the Channel, and the Royal Harwich Yacht Club regatta at Harwich.

Among the awards won were Lord Dunraven's Castle Yacht Club Challenge Cup, a silver tea set and tray from Robert Cross for the Royal Western Yacht Club (in Paisley), silver punch bowls from the Clyde Yacht Club (at Argyll and Bute), Royal Corinthian Yacht Club (at Burnham-on-Crouch), and Royal Albert Yacht Club (in Portsmouth); silver loving cups from the Royal Western Yacht Club of England (in Plymouth) and the West of Scotland Yacht Club in addition to the Maitland Kersey Cup (from the Castle Yacht Club).

Captain Barr returned to America in October 1895, leaving the Niagara at Fay's yards in Southampton for the winter. Gould returned to America the following month in November 1895 aboard the American liner SS St. Louis.

The following year in 1896, she again competed in the English races and won twenty of forty races she participated in, and second at others. After the 1896 season, Gould returned to America in November 1896 again aboard the SS St. Louis. Although the Niagara did well, Gould swore he would never race in the British regattas again (due to issues with the Yacht Racing Association), instead favoring the Kiel and Baltic regattas instead.

In 1960, she was broken up in England.

== See also ==
- USS Niagara (SP-136)
- Valkyrie III
