= Max Rose (American industrialist) =

American industrialist (1894–1968)

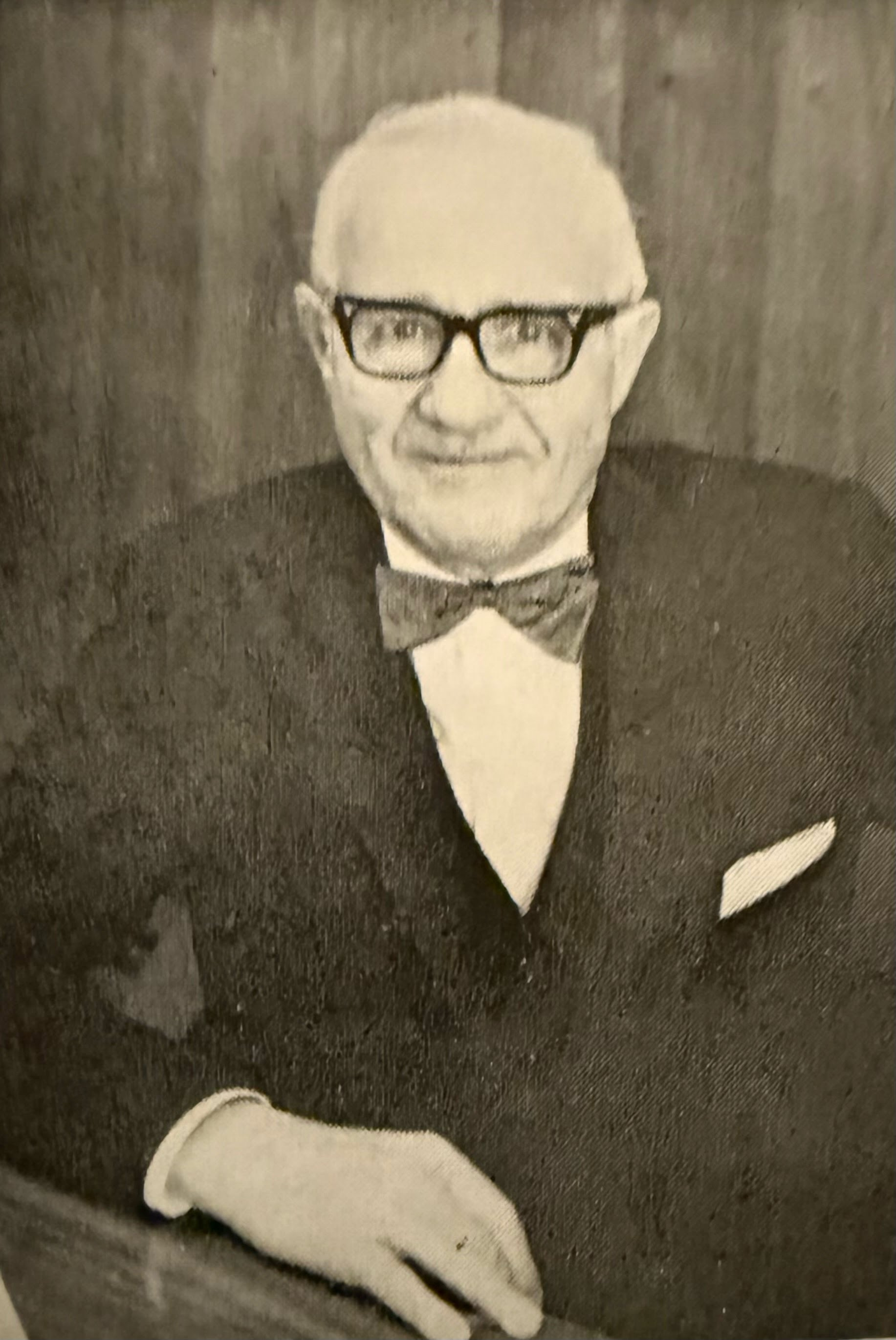
- Born: September 15, 1894; Pinsk
- Died: April 14, 1968 (aged 73); Philadelphia, PA

Max Rose (July 15, 1894 – April 14, 1968) was an American industrialist and philanthropist. He was the founder and Chairman of the Board of Northern Metal Company, the only civilian owned and operated terminal in the world to be used by the US military.

== Early life and career ==
Rose was born in Pinsk and emigrated to Brooklyn, New York as a child. Rose arrived on the Philadelphia waterfront around World War I, working as a rigger at Sun Shipbuilding and Drydock Co. In 1933, Rose founded the Northern Metal Company, a marine terminal operating in the Philadelphia waterfront. Rose built his first pier in 1935 by sinking a drydock hull in the Delaware River.

By 1957, Rose owned and operated a 9-ship terminal in the port of Philadelphia; unusually, this terminal was built with his own capital, instead of, as was typical at the time, with city, state or port agency funds.
