= Howard Gould (financier) =

American financier and socialite (1871–1959)

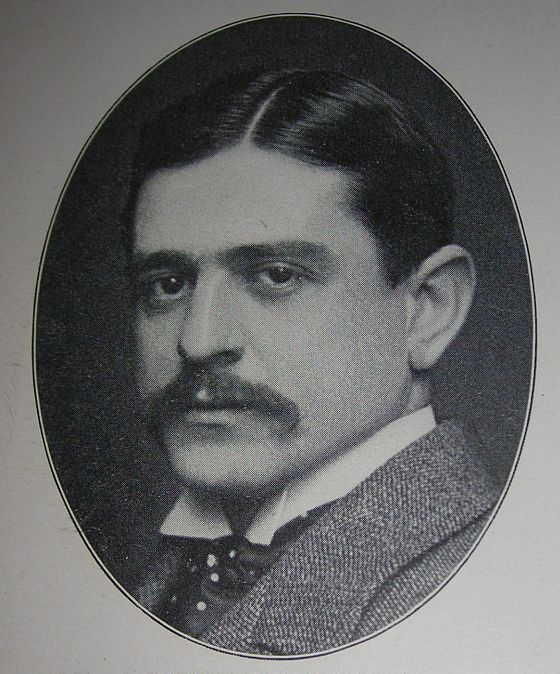
- Gould in Notable New Yorkers, 1899
- Born: June 8, 1871; New York City, US
- Died: September 13, 1959 (aged 88); Doctors Hospital, New York City, US
- Education: Columbia College
- Spouses: Katherine Clemmons (m. 1898; div. 1909) Grete Mosheim (m. 1937; div. 1947)
- Partner: Odette Tyler (1894)
- Parent(s): Jay Gould; Helen Day Miller
- Relatives: siblings: George Jay Gould; Edwin Gould; Helen Miller Shepard; Anna Gould; Frank Jay Gould

Howard Gould (June 8, 1871 – September 13, 1959) was an American financier and the son of Jay Gould.

== Early life ==
Gould was born in Manhattan on June 8, 1871 to railroad financier Jay Gould (1836–1892) and Helen Day Miller (1838–1889). He was the fourth of six children among siblings George, Edwin, Helen, Anna and Frank.

His paternal grandparents were Mary (née More) Gould and John Burr Gould from Roxbury, New York. His maternal grandparents were Daniel Stratton Miller and Ann Kip (née Bailey) Miller, who were prominent members of New York society.

Gould was educated at Columbia College, where he matriculated with the class of 1894 but did not graduate, according to official records.

== Career ==
On February 24, 1898, Gould purchased a seat on the New York Stock Exchange and maintained an office at 195 Broadway in New York. By 1955, his seat was the second oldest on the Exchange and he maintained it until his death in 1959.

He served as a director of many railroad, telegraph and financial firms, including the Missouri Pacific Railway Co., Texas and Pacific Railway Co., Kansas and Arkansas Valley Railway, Kansas City Northwestern Railroad Co., Western Union Telegraph Co., International and Great Northern Railroad Co., Manhattan Railway Co., St. Louis, Iron Mountain and Southern Railway Co., Rio Grande Southern Railroad Co., Rio Grande Western Railroad Co., St. Louis Southwestern Railway Co., Western Maryland Railway Co., American Pneumatic Service Co., New York Mail and Newspaper Transportation Co., and the Gold & Stock Telegraph Co.

== Yachting ==
Gould was a competitive yachtsman and owned several vessels.

=== SV Niagara ===
In 1895, Gould commissioned a 65-foot (20 m) sloop named Niagara. The yacht was designed and built by the Herreshoff Manufacturing Company in Bristol, Rhode Island. He won Lord Dunraven's challenge cup with Niagara.

=== SY Niagara ===
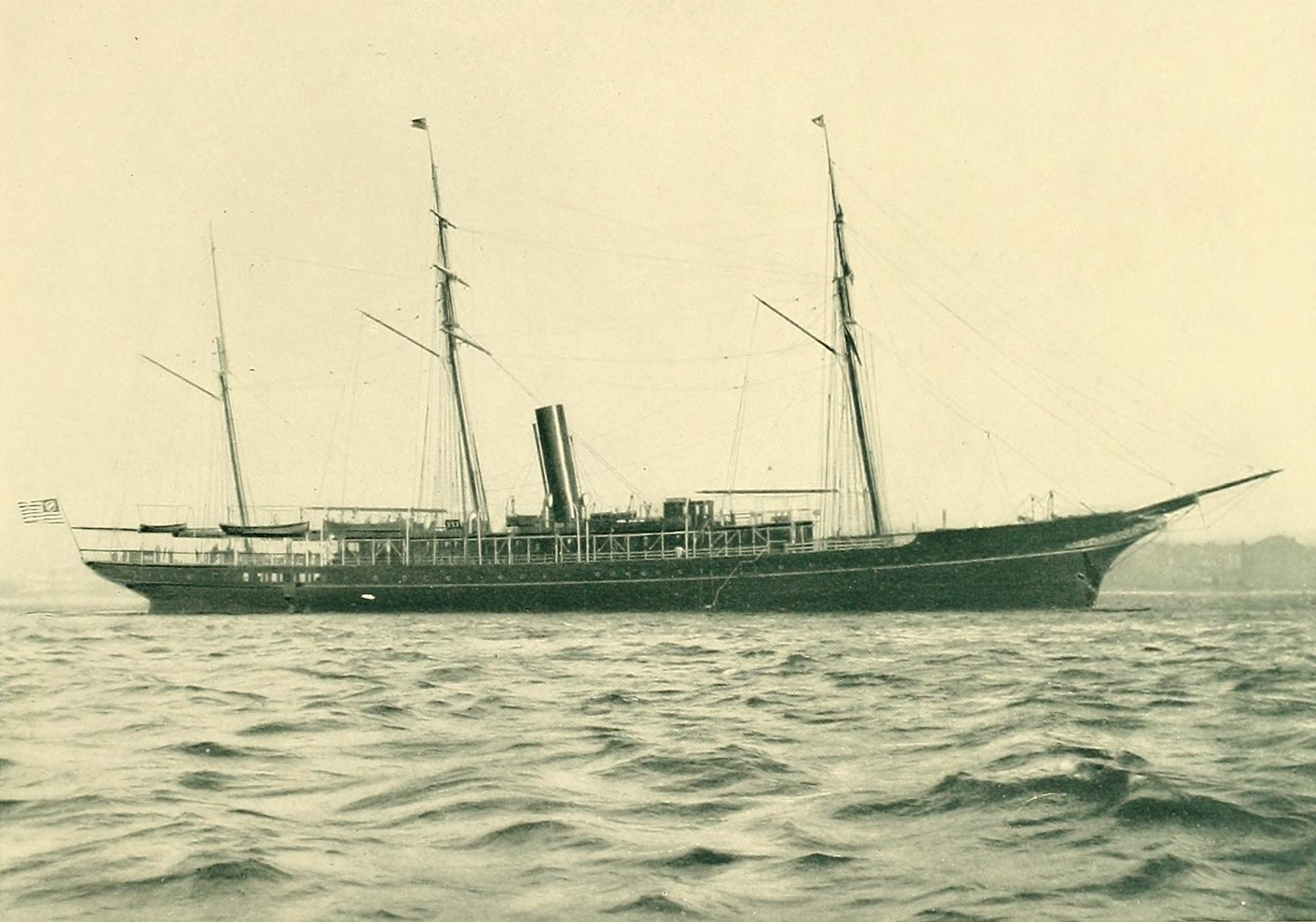
Gould's 1898 steam yacht Niagara

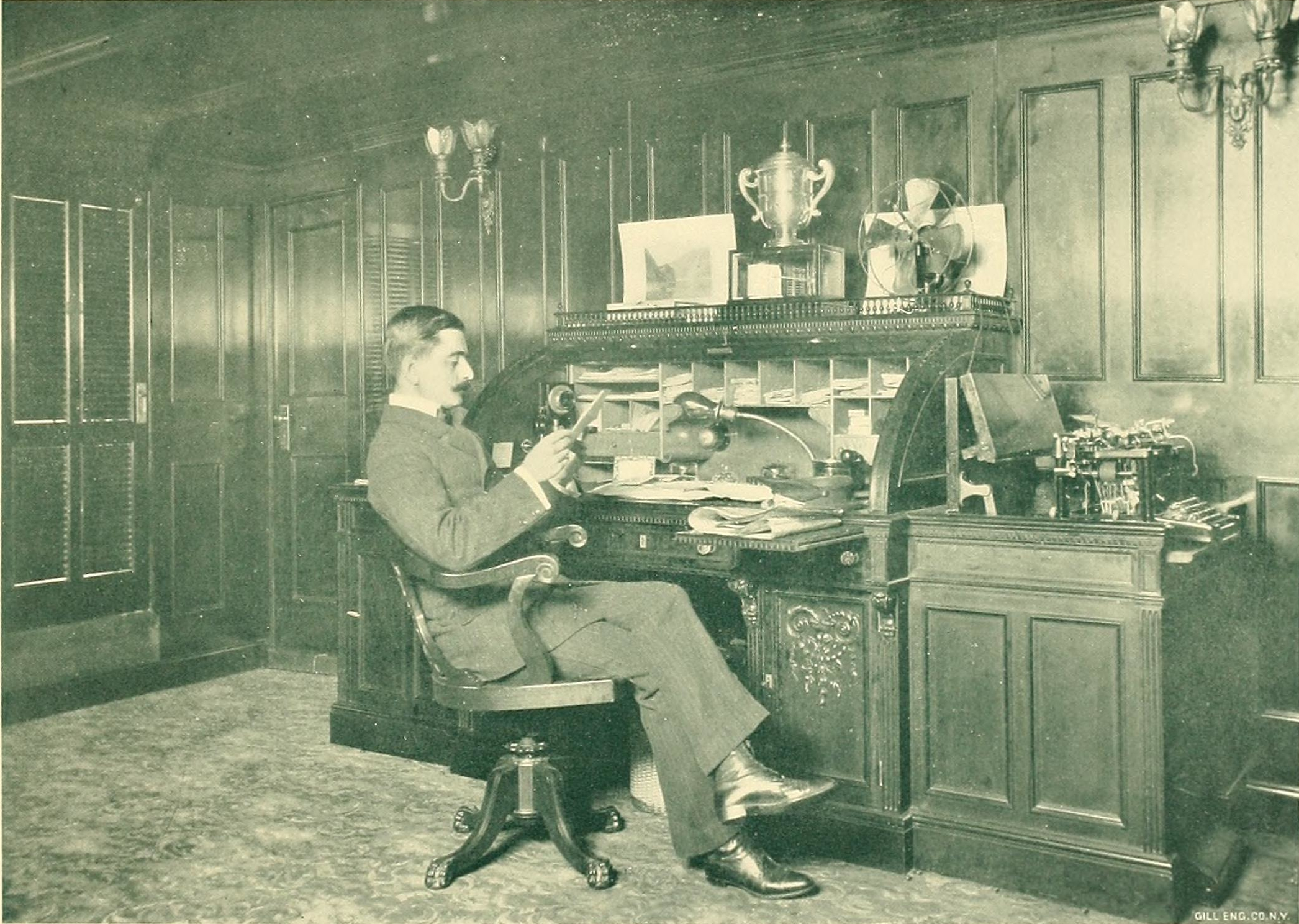
Gould at his desk on the 1898 Niagara

Gould also owned a large steam yacht, also called Niagara, which was built in 1898 by Harlan and Hollingsworth in Wilmington, Delaware. In 1912, he installed a Welte Philharmonic Organ aboard the ship. On August 10, 1917, the U.S. Navy purchased her and converted her into an armed patrol yacht. She was commissioned in the Tebo's Yacht Basin, Brooklyn, New York on 16 April 1918, Commander E.B. Larimer in command.

=== Vamoose ===
In 1901 Gould purchased the well-known steam yacht Vamoose. Built in 1891 by Herreshoff for media magnate William Randolph Hearst, the yacht was well-publicized due to her racing pedigree and a series of high-profile speed trials against other yachts around New York City in the early 1890s.

== Personal life ==
In 1894, Gould was engaged to marry actress Odette Tyler, but both of their families objected, and the engagement was broken.

On October 12, 1898, he married Katherine Clemmons (1874–1930). She was an actress whose career had been heavily subsidized by William F. Cody. She filed for a divorce in 1907, which was finalized in 1909, and Howard charged her with infidelity, naming Cody. Despite the allegations leveled at his wife in the divorce proceedings, Gould was ordered to pay $36,000 per year in alimony (approximately $1,290,000 today). It was the largest alimony settlement ordered up to that time. She died in Lynchburg, Virginia in 1930.

In 1937, he married the actress Grete Mosheim in Klagenfurt, having been a financier/producer on at least one of her London stage appearances. They divorced in 1947.

Gould died at Doctors Hospital in Manhattan on September 13, 1959, aged 88. He was his parents' last surviving son. He was buried in the Gould Mausoleum at Woodlawn Cemetery, Bronx.

=== Residence ===
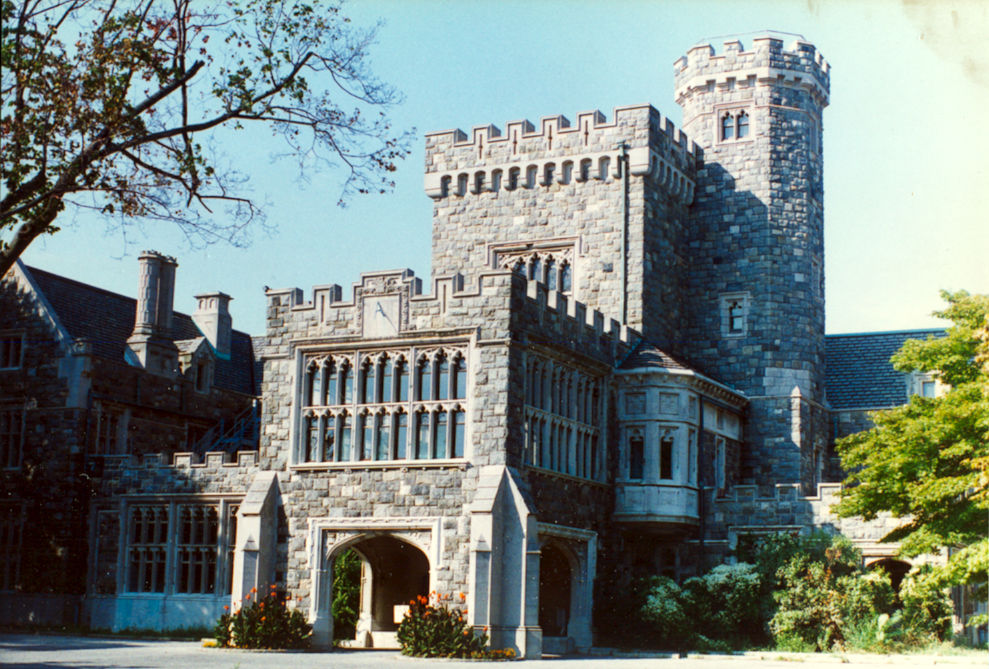
Hempstead House.

In 1901, Gould purchased undeveloped land in Sands Point to build a new home for his wife Katherine Clemmons. After Howard and Katherine separated in 1909, he continued to build the estate, using Hunt & Hunt to design an English Tudor style mansion. The 40-room house, one of the more elaborate of the Gold Coast of Long Island estates, is 225 feet (69 m) long and 125 feet (38 m) wide, with an 80-foot (24 m) tower. The first and second floors measure over 1 and 1/2 acres and the home, which Gould called Hempstead House, was an exact copy of Kilkenny Castle in Ireland.

Howard moved to Europe in 1917 and sold the estate to Daniel Guggenheim and his family. The estate, which had cost Gould over $1 million, sold for only $600,000, including the furnishing. In 1971, Nassau County took over a 128‐acre portion of the estate from the Federal Government to be used as a nature preserve. The mansion later underwent a $10 million renovation.
