= USS Niagara (SP-136) =

Steam yacht utilized by the US Navy from 1917 to 1931

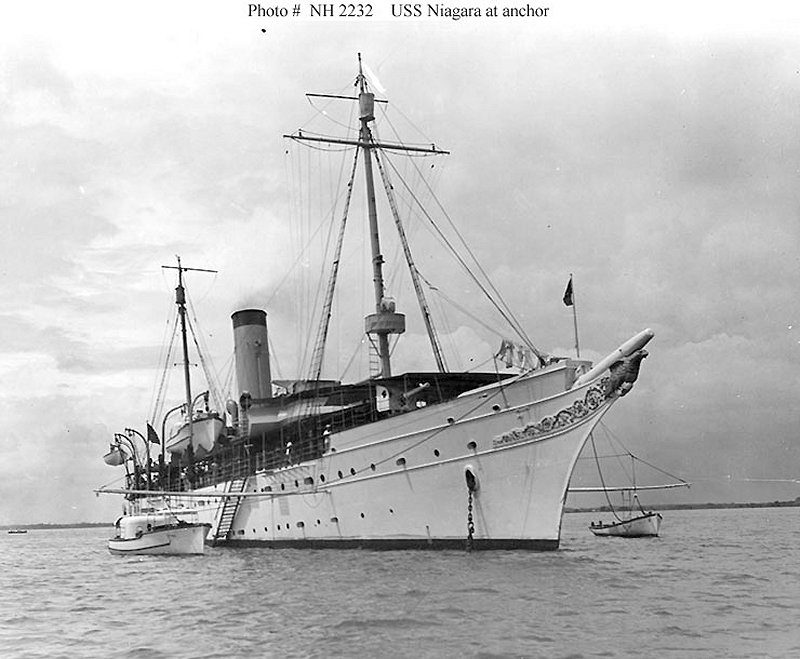

History

United States
- Name: USS Niagara
- Namesake: Fort Niagara
- Owner: Howard Gould
- Port of registry: New York
- Builder: Harlan and Hollingsworth, Wilmington, DE
- Completed: 1898
- Acquired: 10 August 1917
- Commissioned: 16 April 1918
- Decommissioned: 3 March 1931
- Stricken: 10 December 1931
- Fate: Sold for scrapping 13 September 1933
- Notes: Reclassified PY-9 17 July 1920

General characteristics
- Type: armed yacht
- Tonnage: 1,444 GRT, 703 NRT
- Displacement: 2,690 tons
- Length: 282 ft 0 in (85.95 m) overall; 245.0 ft (74.7 m) registered
- Beam: 36.0 ft (11.0 m)
- Draft: 17 ft 0 in (5.18 m)
- Depth: 19.4 ft (5.9 m)
- Installed power: 530 NHP
- Propulsion: 2 × triple-expansion engines; 2 × screws
- Speed: 12 knots (22 km/h)
- Complement: 195 (Note: The on line Dictionary of American Naval Fighting Ships gives a complement of 1,651, which clearly is a typographical error.)
- Armament: 4 × 4-inch (102-mm) guns; 2 × machine guns; 1 × Y-gun

The sixth USS Niagara (SP-136), later PY-9, was a United States Navy patrol vessel in commission from 1918 to 1931 and which served during World War I.

== Acquisition ==
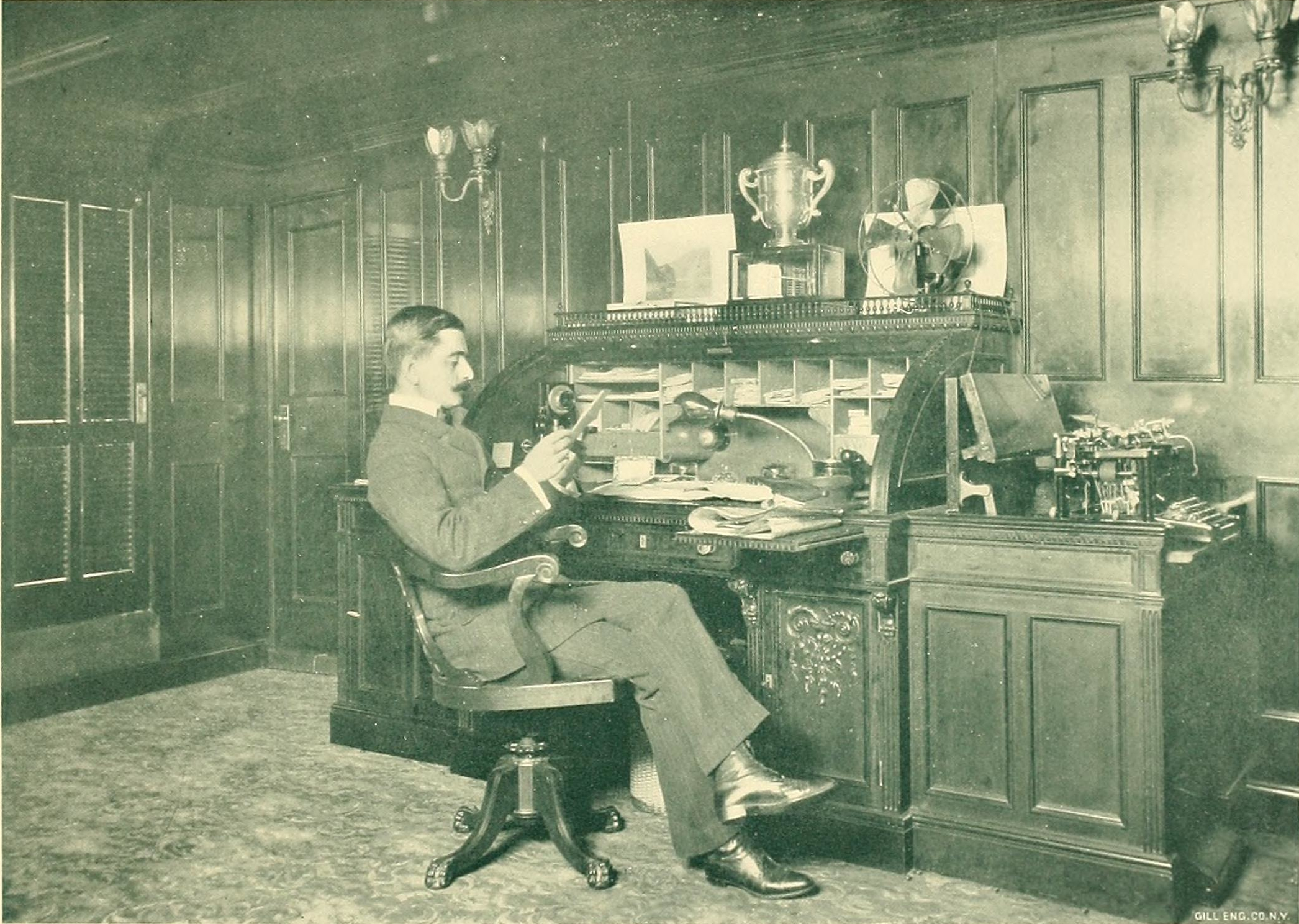
Howard Gould at his desk aboard the Niagara

Niagara was a steam yacht built in 1898 by Harlan and Hollingsworth, Wilmington, Delaware. The U.S. Navy purchased her on 10 August 1917 from Howard Gould of New York, New York, and converted her into an armed patrol yacht. She was commissioned in the Tebo's Yacht Basin, Brooklyn, New York, on 16 April 1918.

== World War I Service ==
Niagara departed New York on 21 May 1918 as escort for a merchant convoy bound for Bermuda and the Azores. She arrived at Ponta Delgada, Azores, on 12 August 1918 and departed on 22 August 1918 to join the American Patrol Detachment at Grassy Bay, Bermuda. On 5 September 1918 she stood out of Grassy Bay to rescue and tow in the merchant sloop Gauntlet, which was adrift after her sails had been carried away in a storm.

On 14 September 1918 Niagara sailed for Martinique in the West Indies to escort the French cable ship Pouyer Quertier, arriving at Fort-de-France on 19 September 1918. The two ships operated in the West Indies, visiting Trinidad, Barbados, Martinique, and Puerto Rico, until Niagara stood out from Port of Spain, Trinidad, on 13 December 1918 for Charleston, South Carolina.

== Postwar Service ==
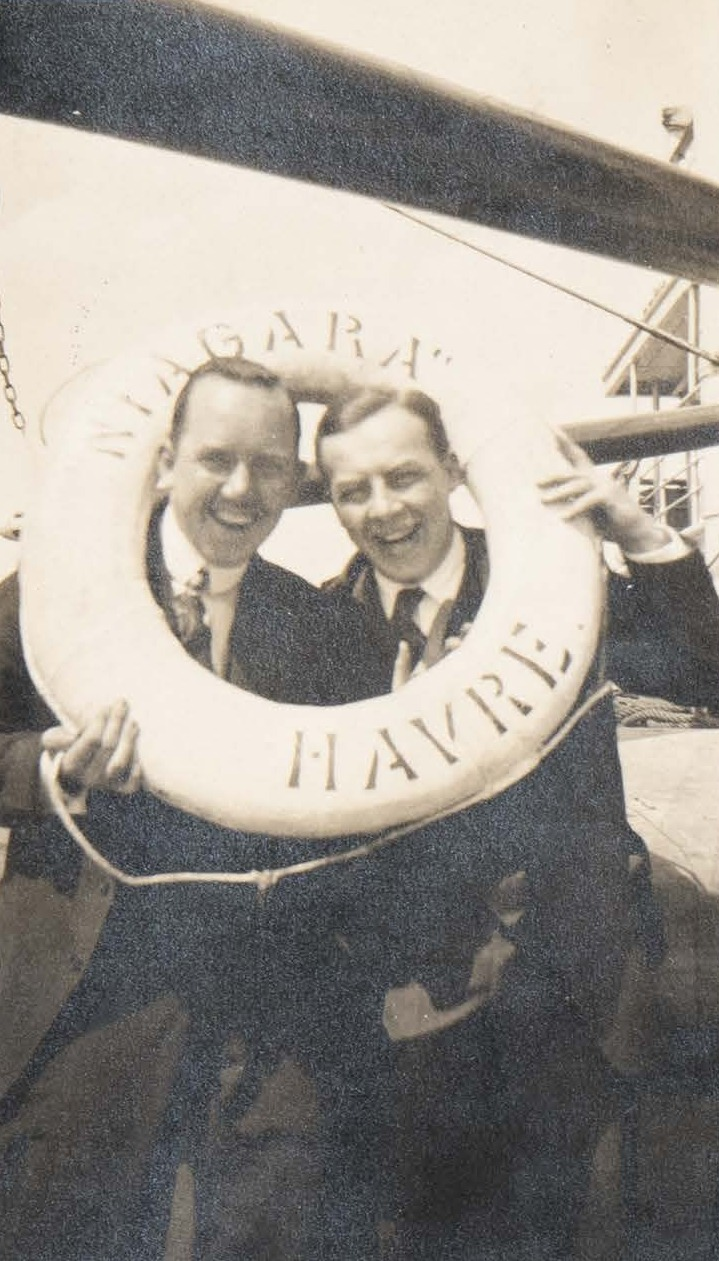
Men and lifebuoy, 1915

Niagara entered the New York Navy Yard on 13 May 1919 for repairs before training out of New London, Connecticut, and New York. She departed New York on 25 September 1919 for Key West, Florida, then cruised off the coast of Mexico and between ports in Texas, Louisiana, and Florida. Other missions took her off Honduras, Guatemala, and Cuba.

Reclassified PY-9 on 17 July 1920, she continued patrols in the Caribbean Sea as a unit of the special service squadron until decommissioning at Philadelphia, Pennsylvania, on 21 April 1922.

Niagara recommissioned on 24 June 1924. She sailed on 3 November 1924 to survey in the Caribbean under the direction of the Navy Hydrographic Office. She operated most of the next eight years charting the Gulf of Venezuela and the coast of Central America.

Her last survey cruise ended when she returned to Philadelphia on 17 October 1930. Niagara decommissioned on 3 March 1931 and her name was struck from the Navy List on 10 December 1931. She was sold for scrapping on 13 September 1933 to the Northern Metal Company of Philadelphia.

== 1899 gallery ==
In 1899, when the Niagara was owned by Howard Gould, photographs of the ship were included a book entitled Niagara; The Old And The New by Frank L. Blanchard. Originally, Niagara had a Welte Style 6 Concert Orchestrion which went through two decks (as pictured below - only the lower portion of the instrument is visible in the second row center photograph); Gould replaced this in 1912 with a Welte Philharmonic Organ.

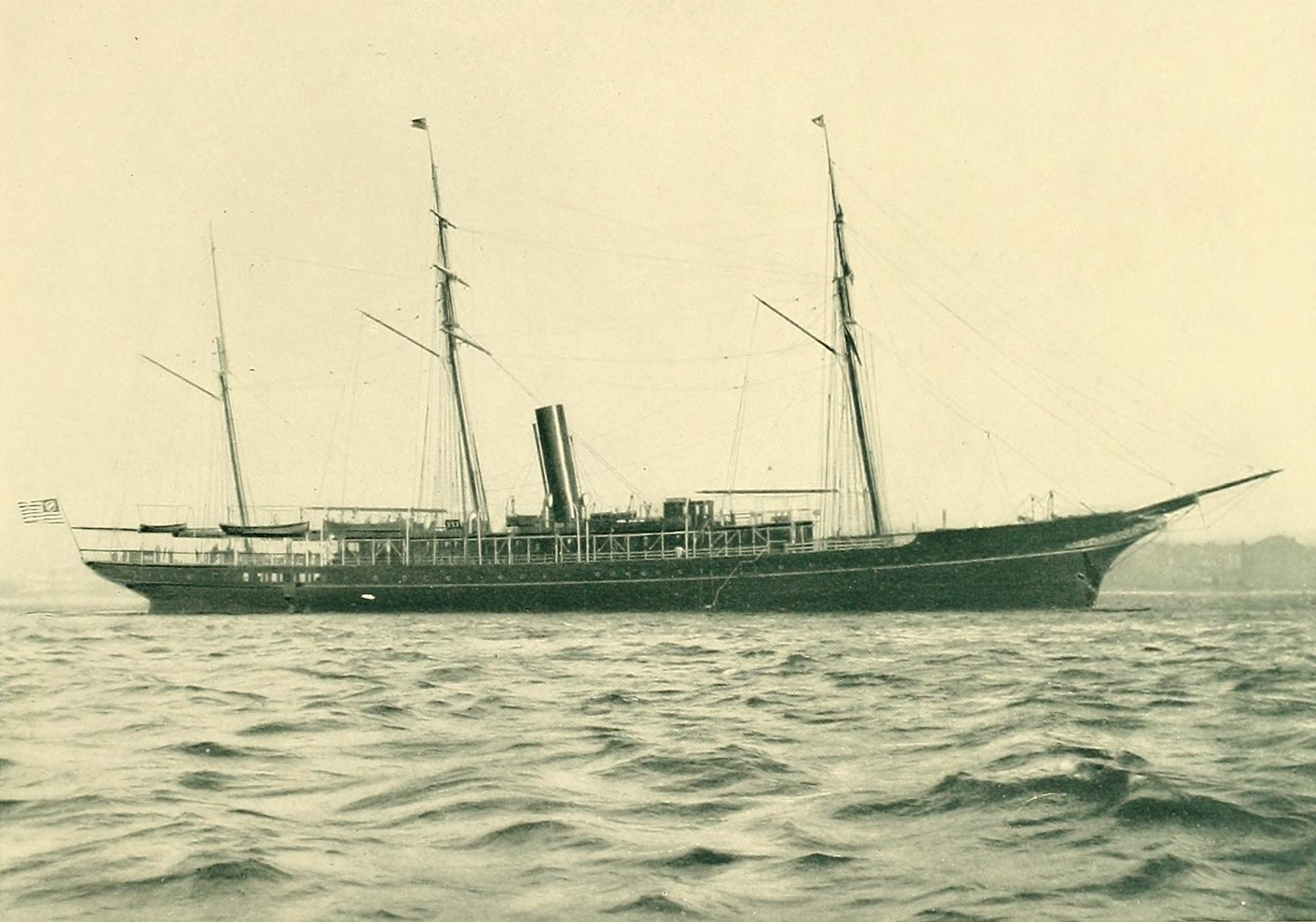

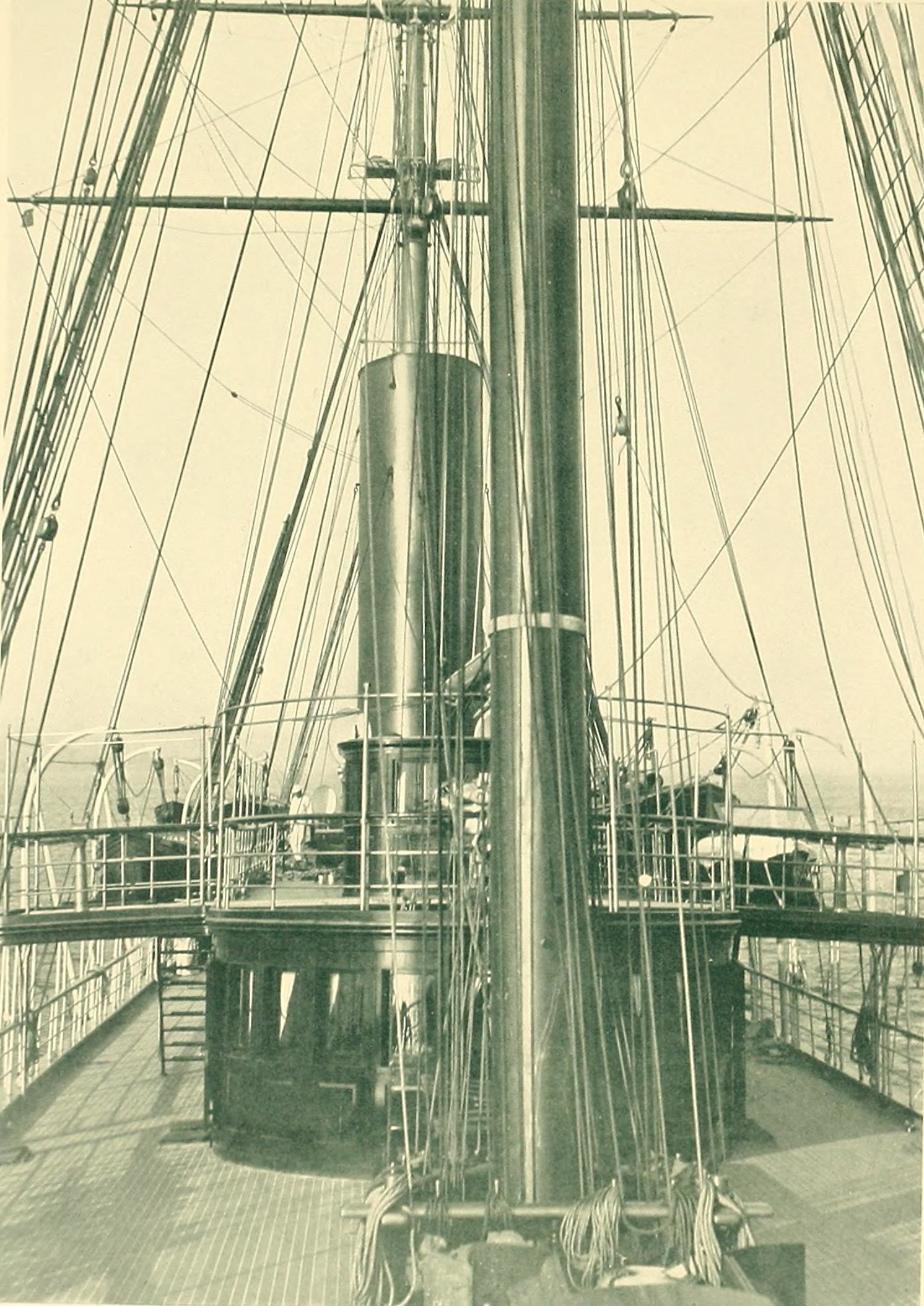

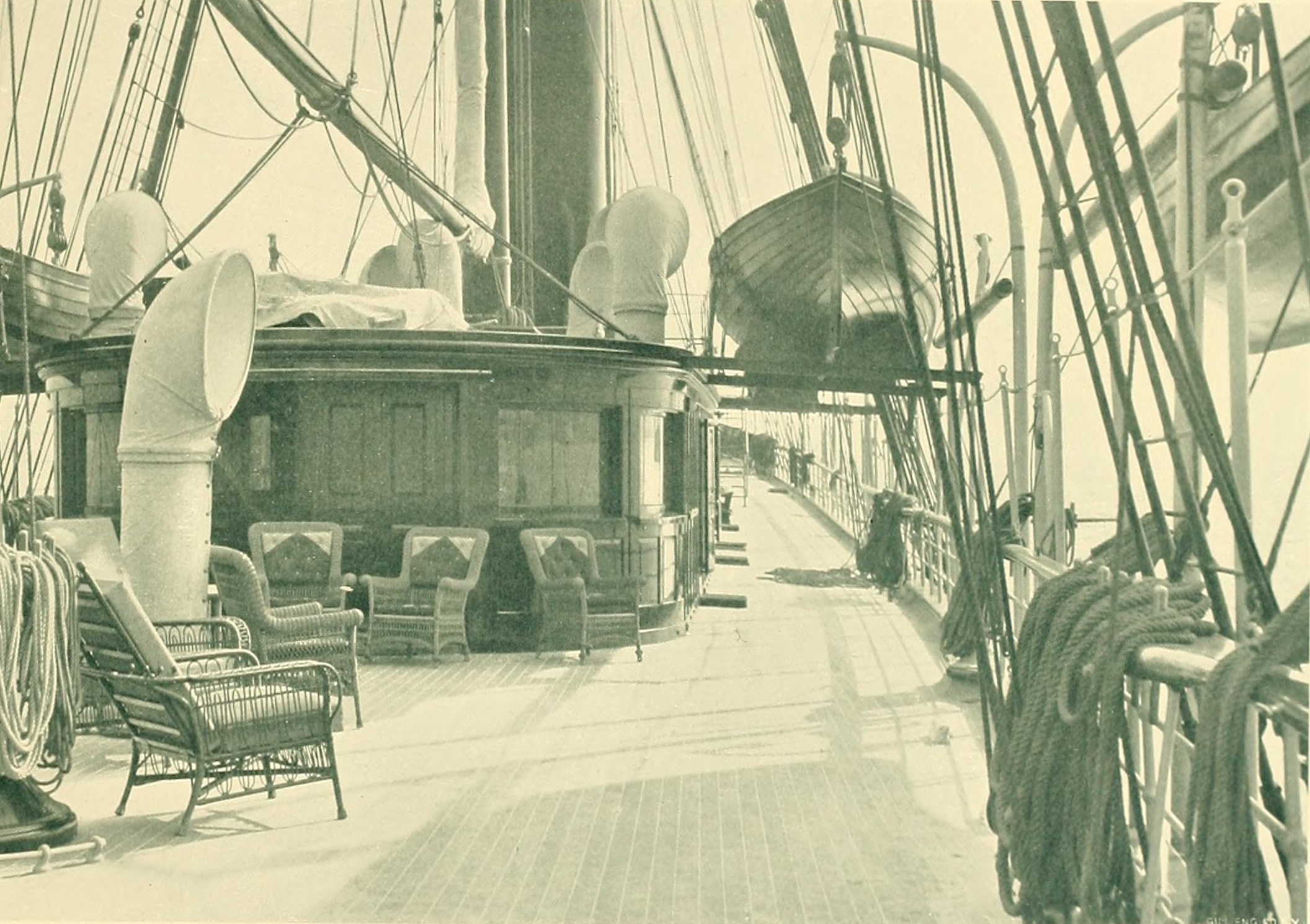

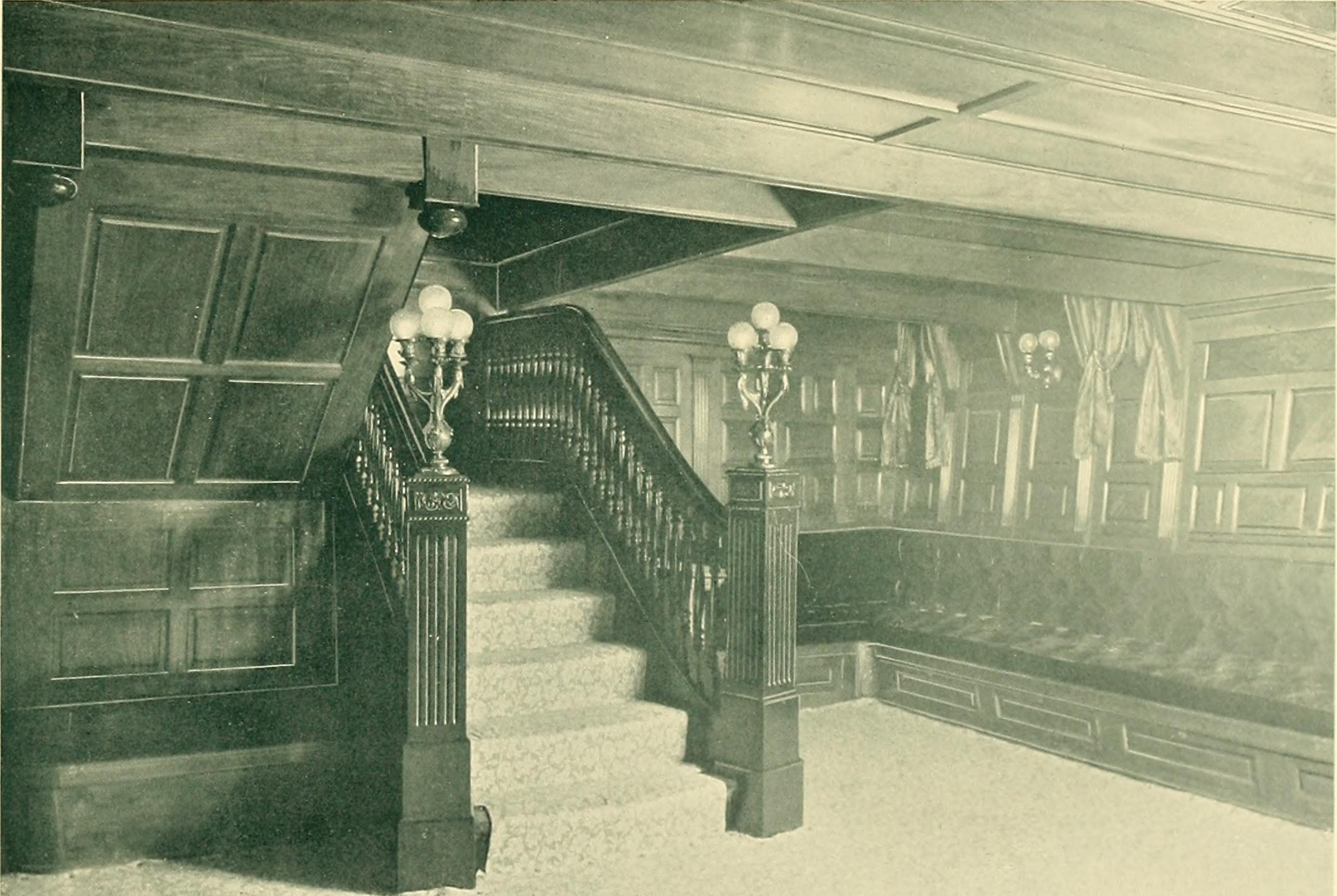

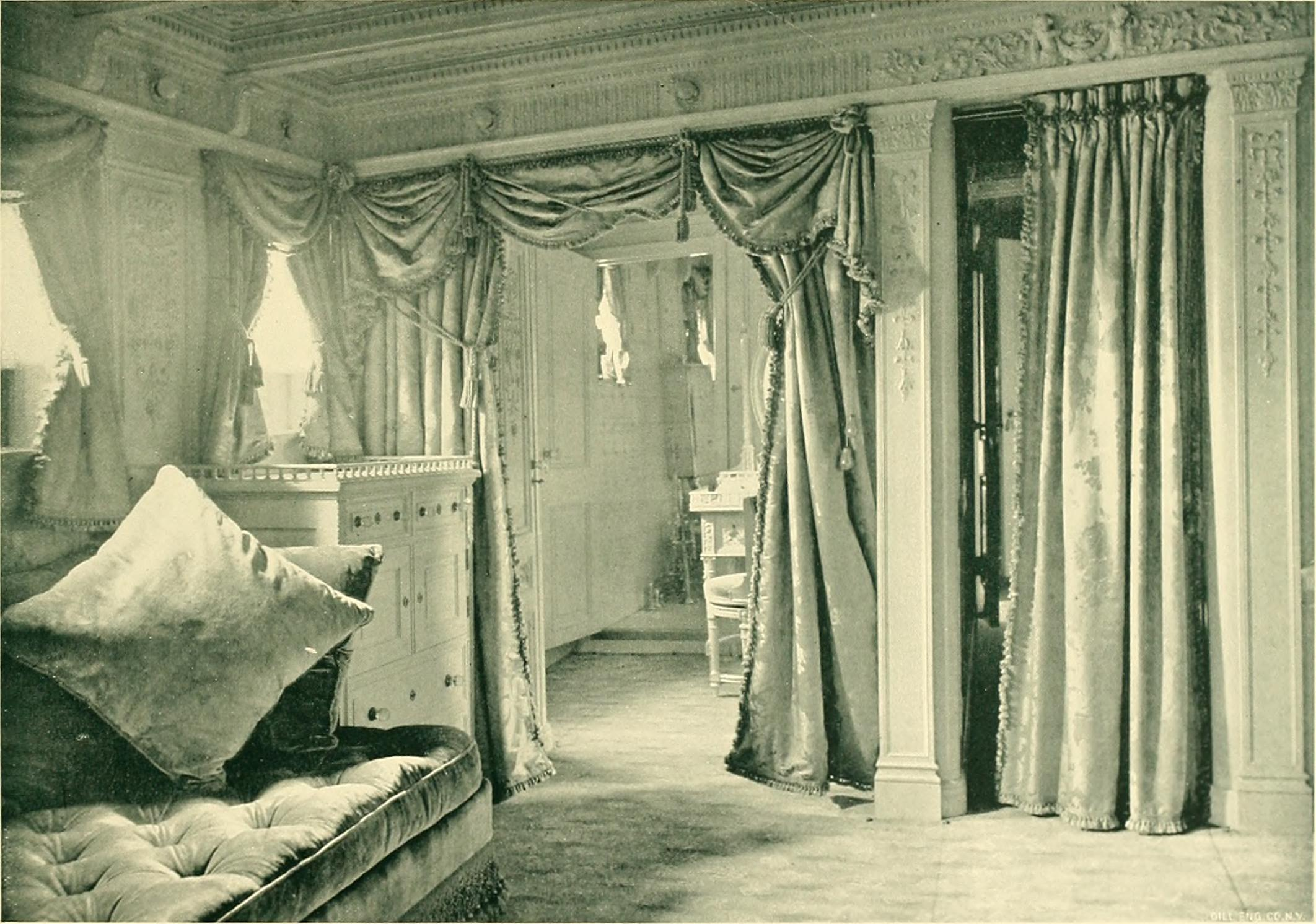

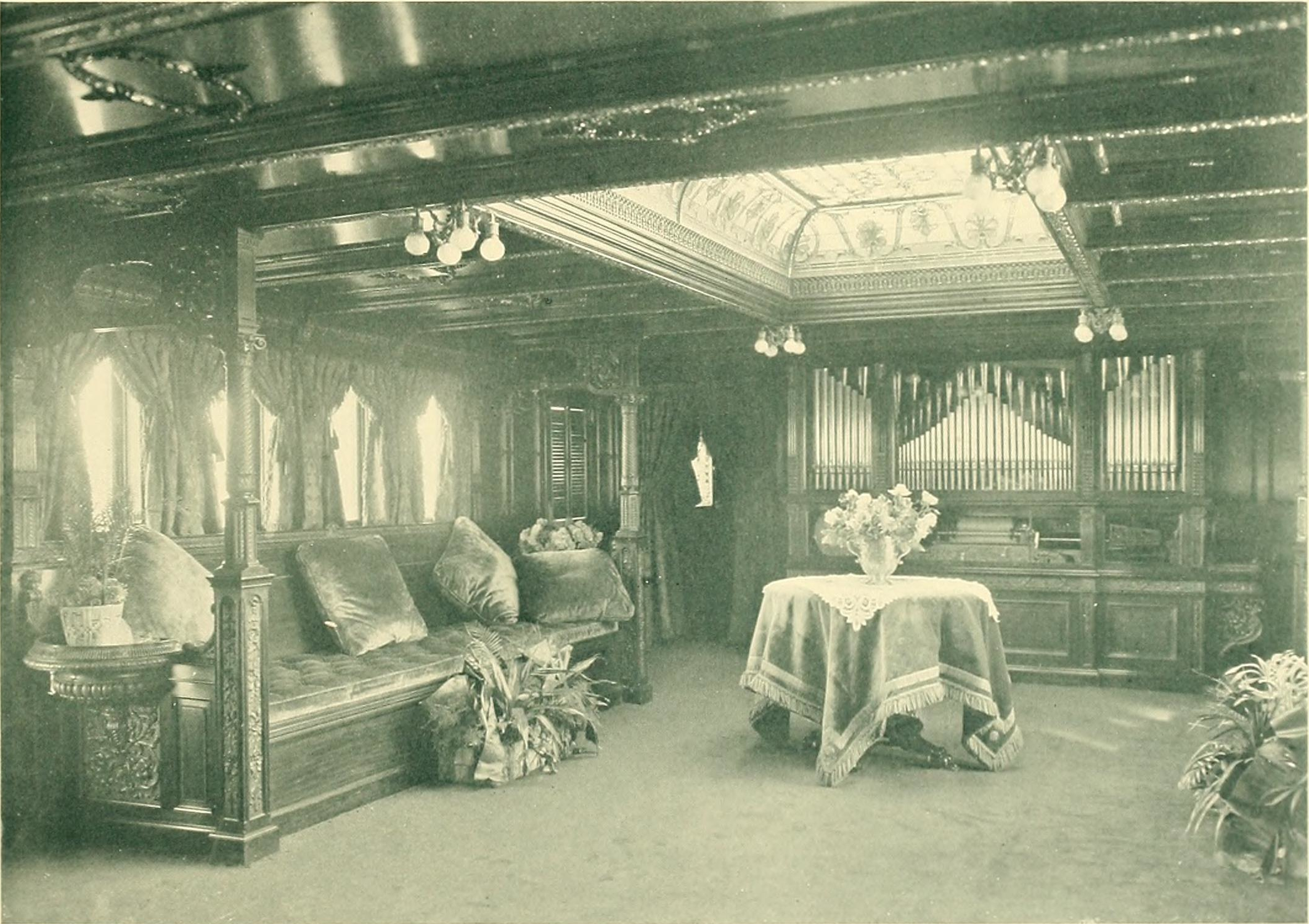

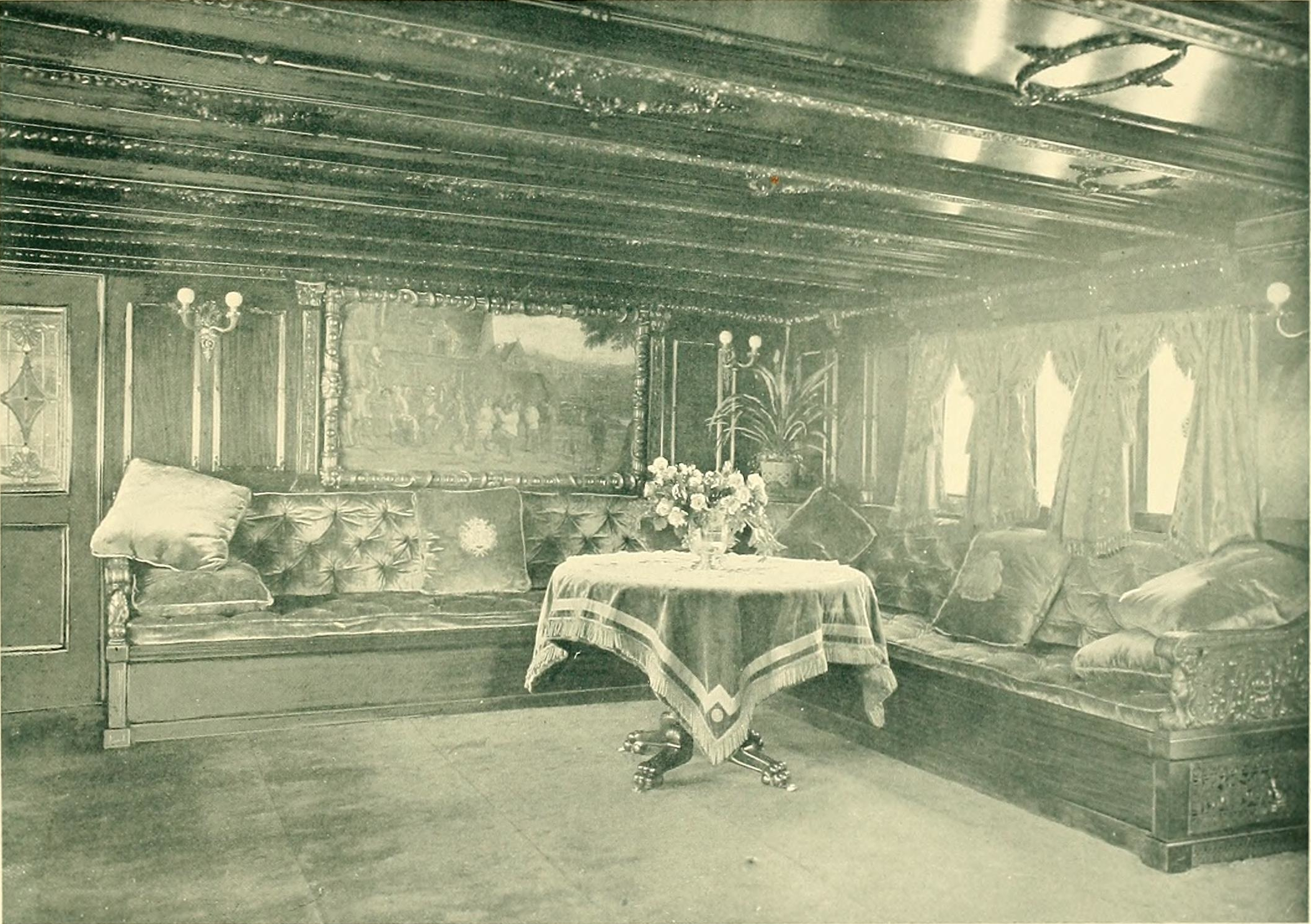

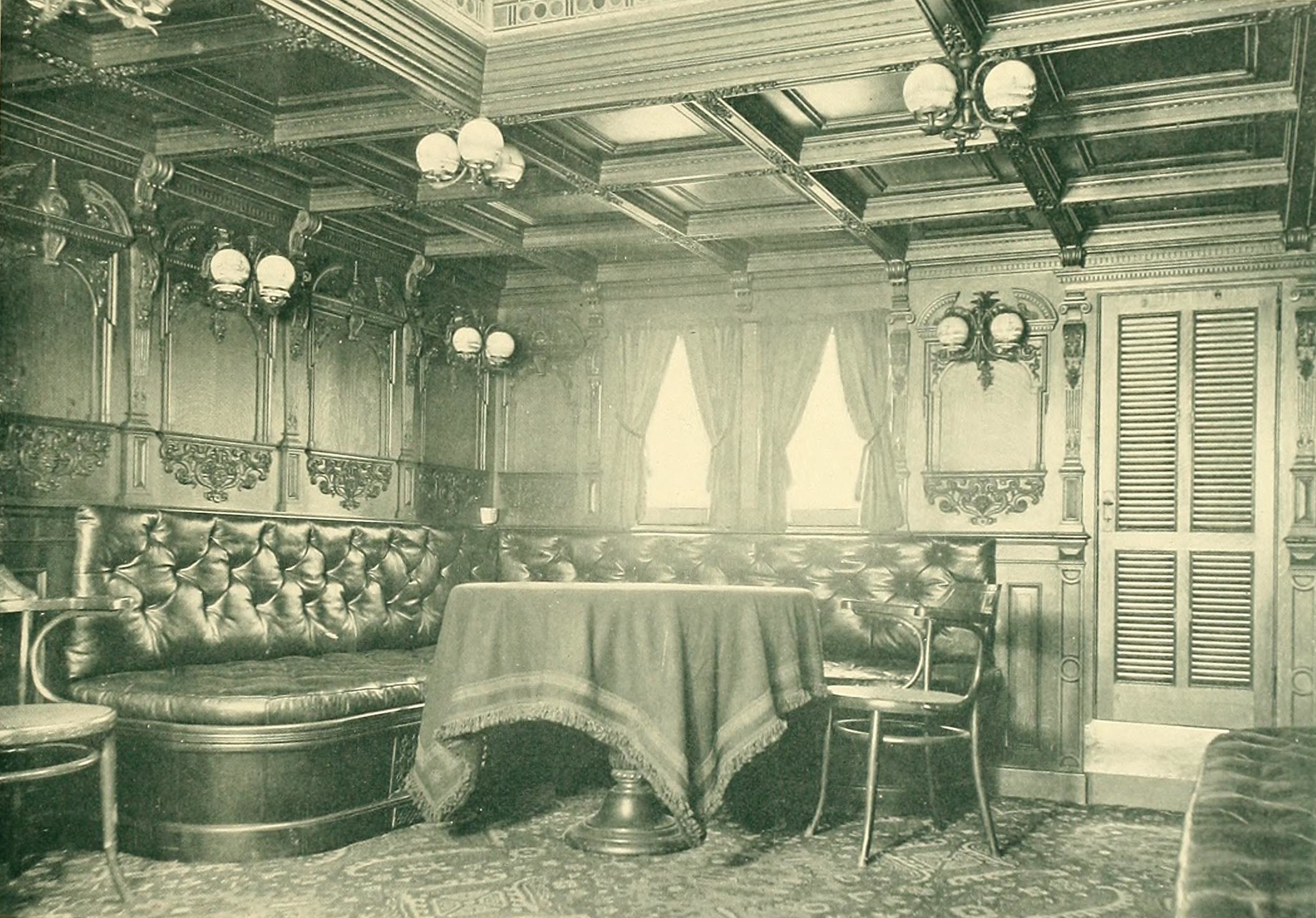

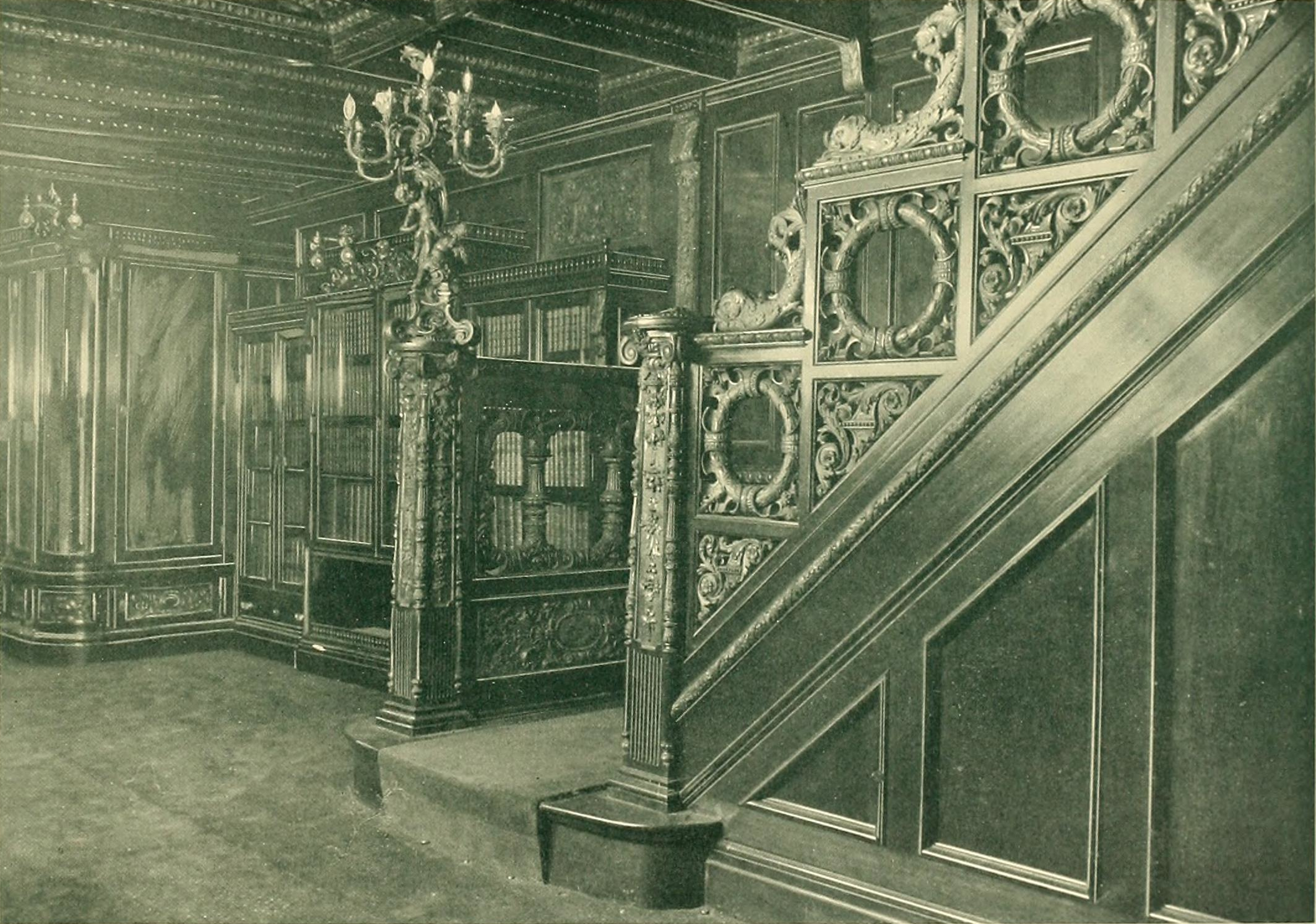

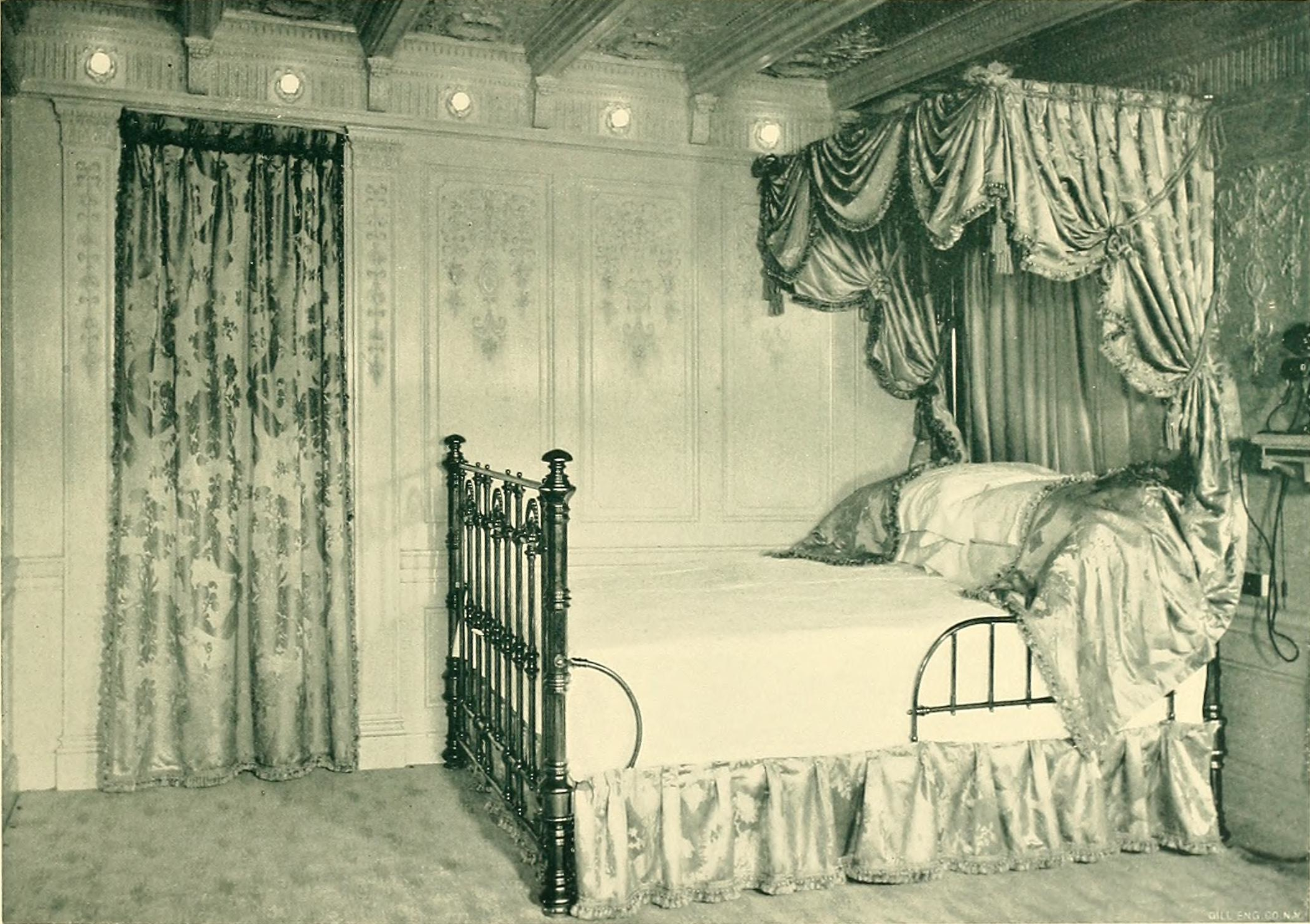

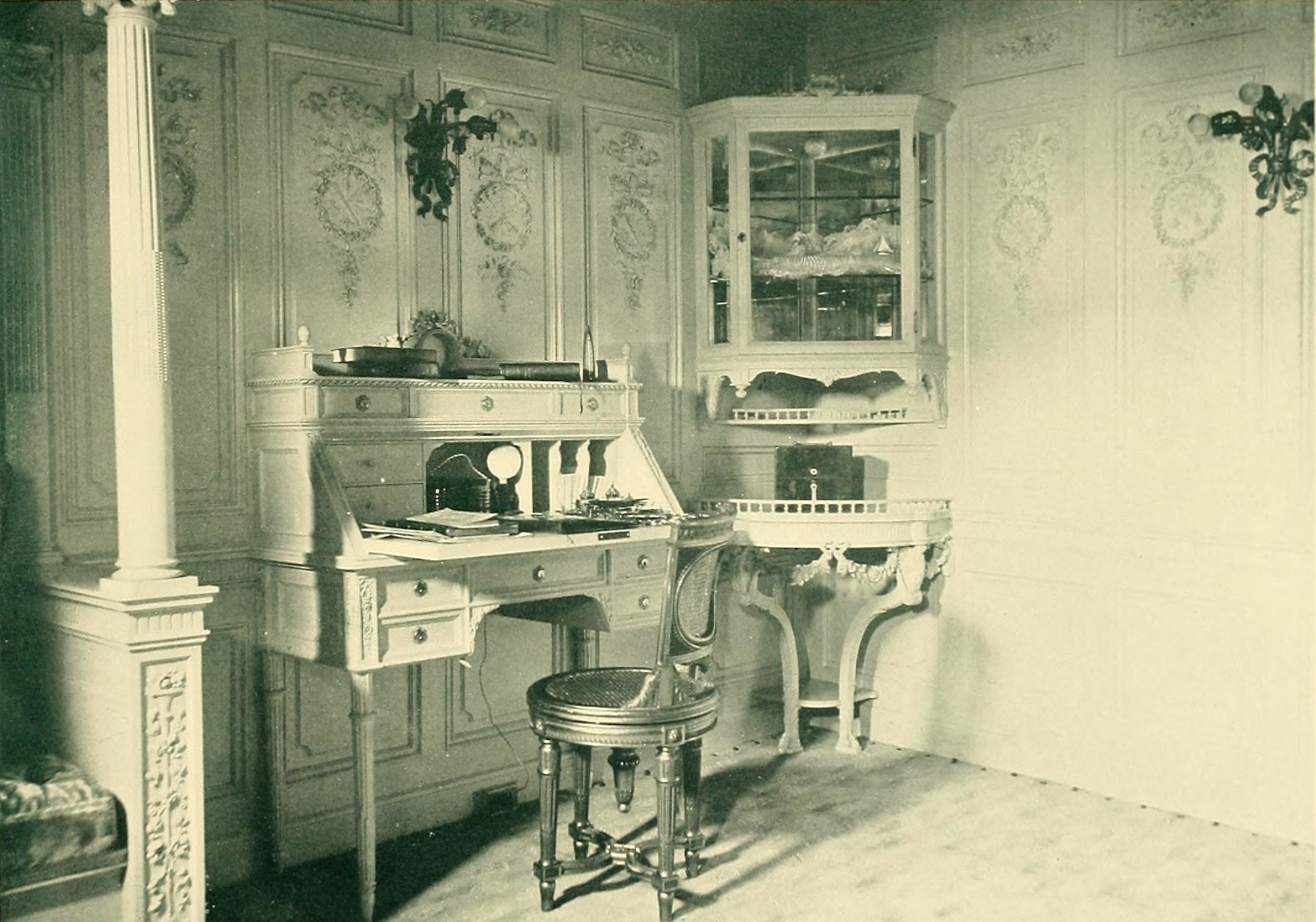

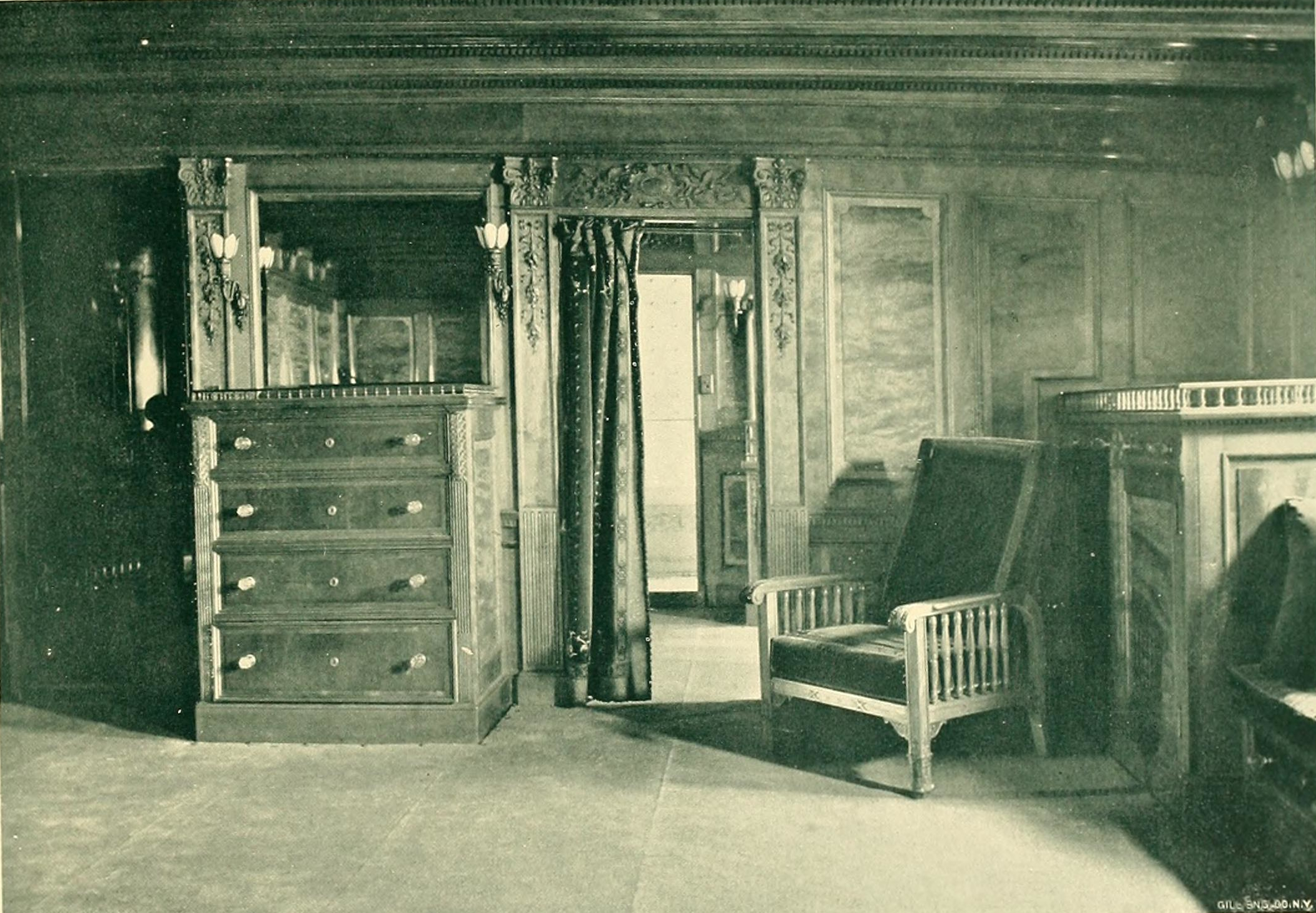

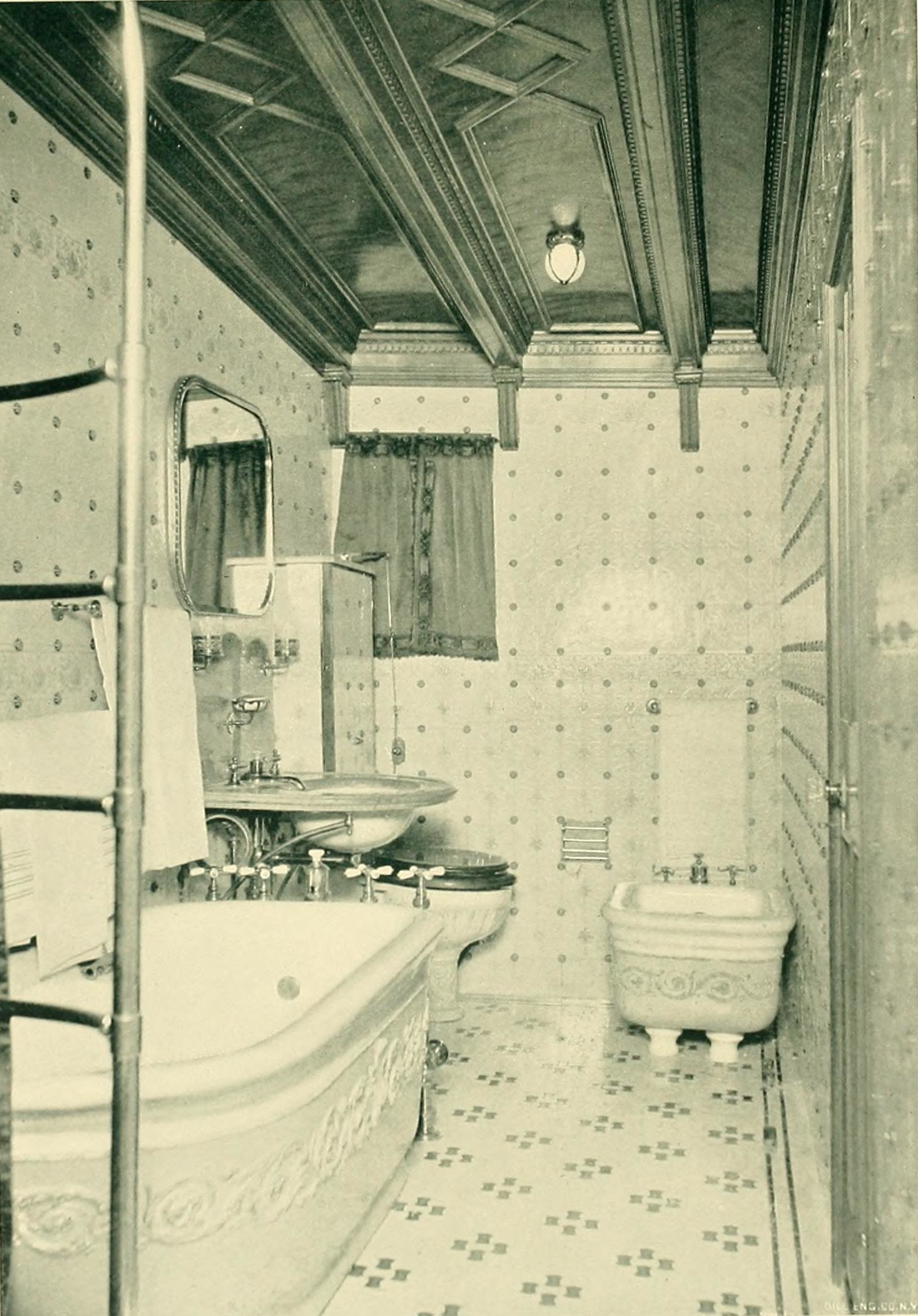

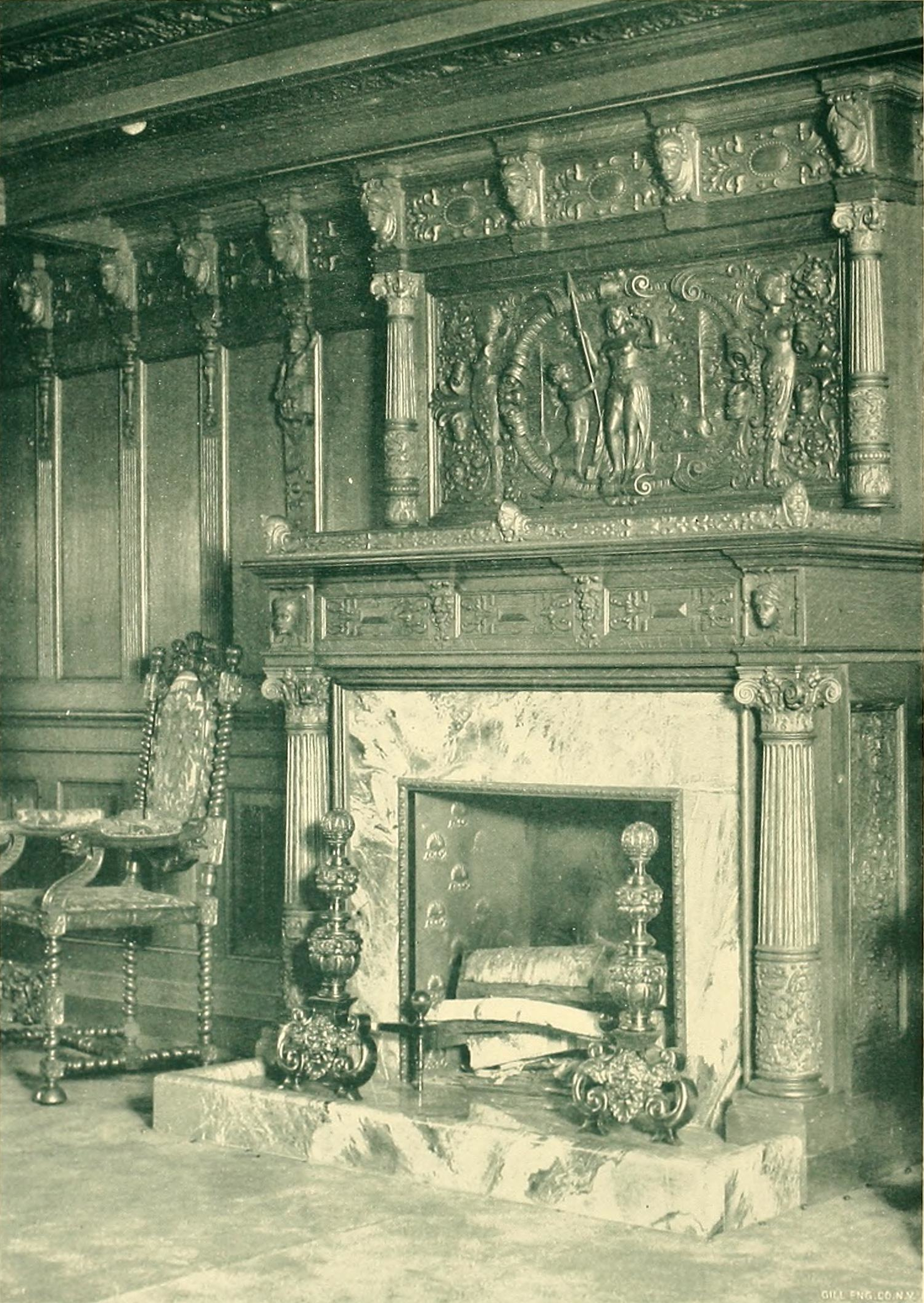

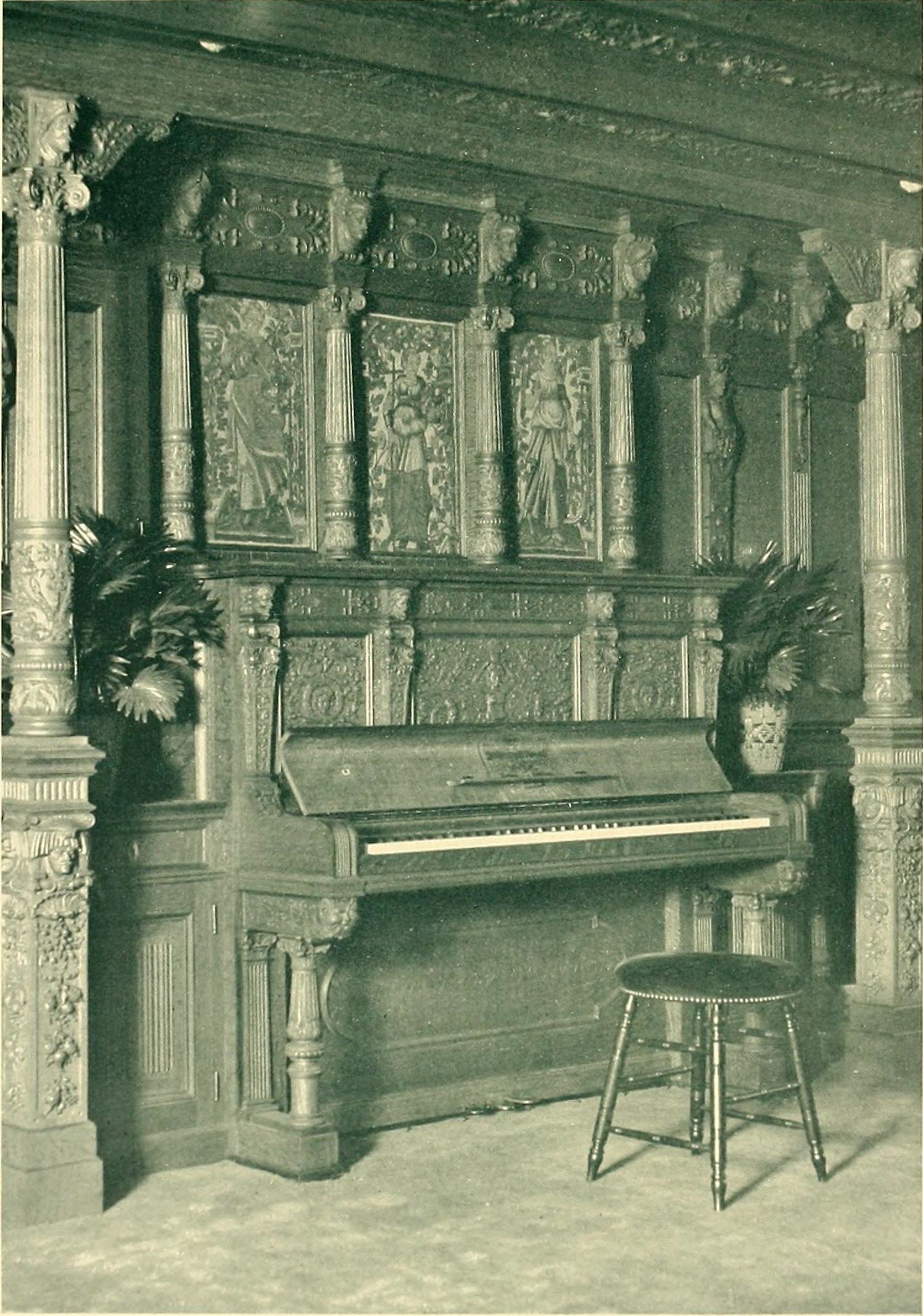

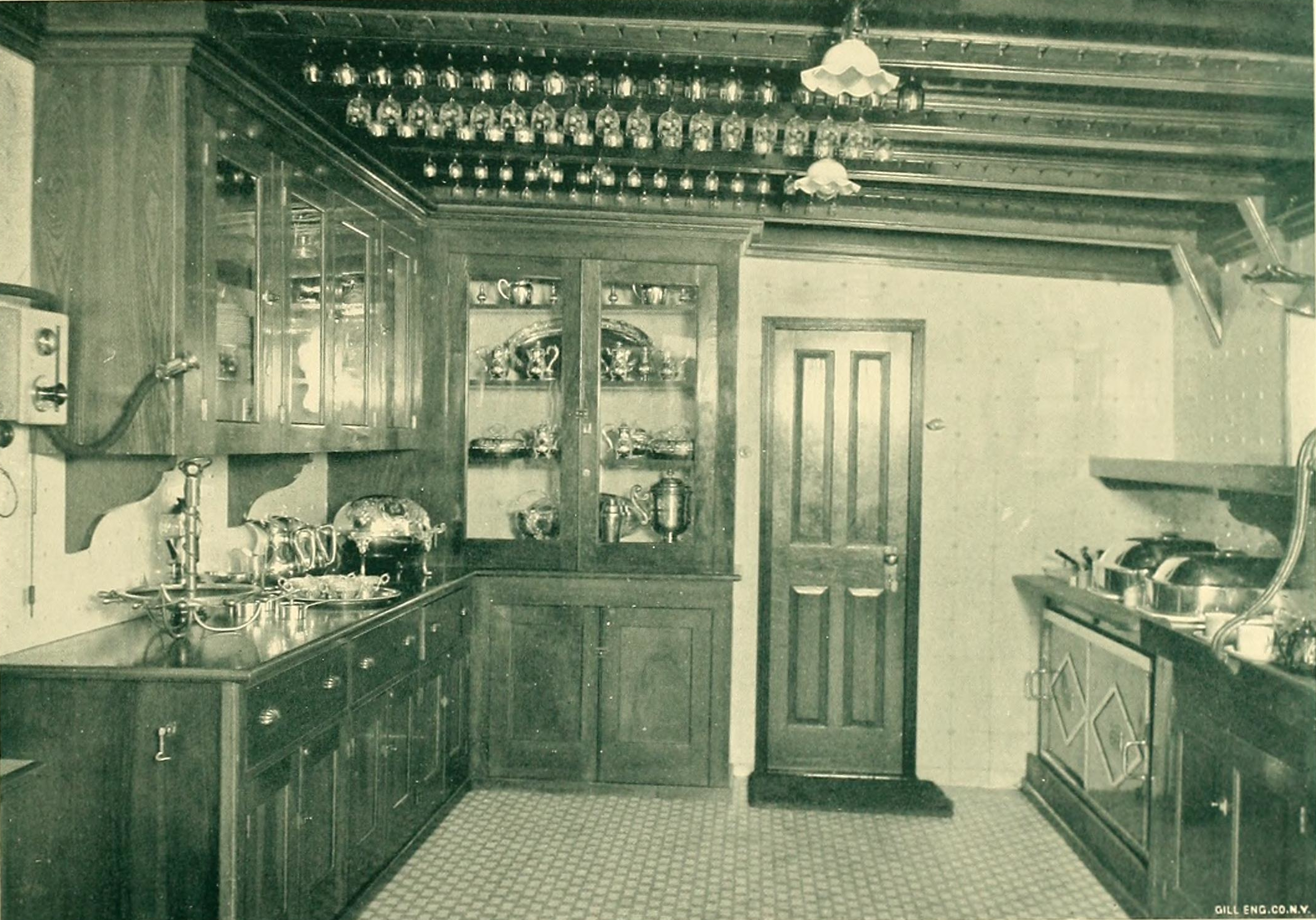

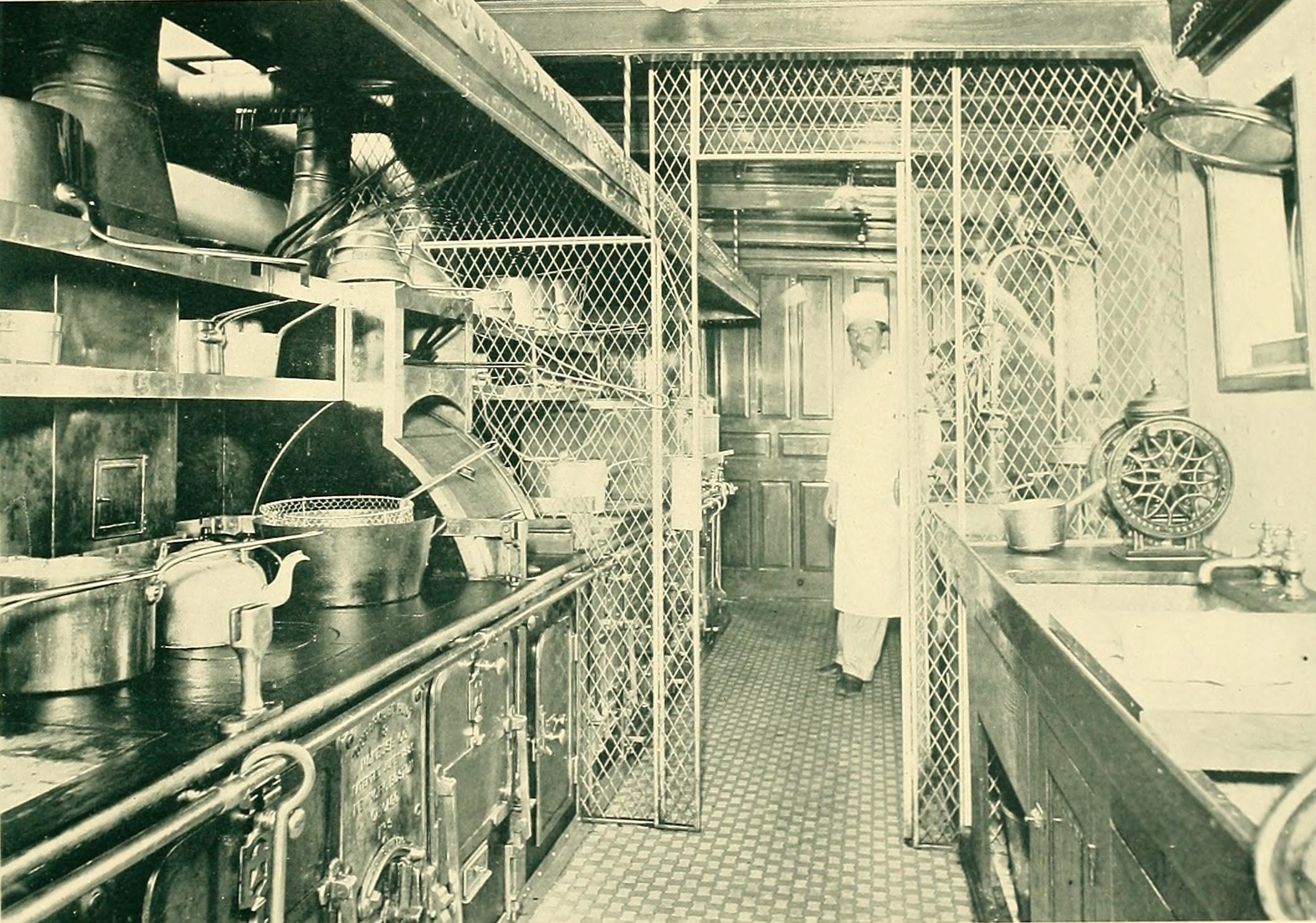
