= HMS Hargood =

HMS Hargood has been the name of more than one ship of the British Royal Navy, and may refer to:

- HMS Ascension (K502), a frigate in commission from 1943 to 1946 briefly named Hargood while under construction in 1943
- HMS Hargood (K582), a frigate in commission from 1944 to 1946
