= USS Hargood =

USS Hargood has been the name of more than one United States Navy ship, and may refer to:

- USS Hargood (PF-74), a patrol frigate transferred to the United Kingdom prior to completion which served in the Royal Navy as the frigate HMS Ascension (K502) from 1943 to 1946
- USS Hargood (DE-573), a destroyer escort transferred to the United Kingdom upon completion which served in the Royal Navy as HMS Hargood (K582) from 1944 to 1946
