= Viola Katherine Clemmons =

American actress

Katherine Dayan
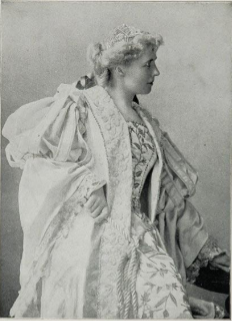
- Clemmons in 1894
- Born: Viola Katherine Clemmons; 17 November 1874; Scotts County, Illinois, US
- Died: 24 December 1930 (aged 56); Lynchburg, Virginia, US
- Occupation: Actress
- Spouse: Howard Gould (m. 1898; div. 1909)

Viola Katherine Clemmons, stage name Katherine Dayan, (17 November 1874 – 24 December 1930) was an actress, best known for her romantic relationship with Buffalo Bill and for her marriage to Howard Gould, which ended in a highly publicized divorce.

== Early life ==
Viola Katherine Clemmons was born in Scott County, Illinois. Her parents were Seldon Perry Clemmons and Martha Isabell (née) Kilpatrick. Seldon worked in retail running his own company called "S. P. Clemmons" and her mother Martha was a homemaker. In Katherine's first years of life, she was raised in Montezuma, Illinois. Katherine was the couple's third child. Their oldest daughter was named Ella May (1861–1935). Seldon and Martha later had Ida Susan (1864–1871). Katherine's parents later divorced when she was still young. After the divorce, the two surviving children (Ella May and Katherine) went to live with their father. In 1876, they went to live with their mother Martha, who had married Judge Walton Dayan, a stationer for the Southern Pacific Railroad. Occasionally, Katherine and Ella visited their father and eight half-siblings. In 1891, Katherine, Ella May, Martha, and Walton moved to 449 Seneca Street in Palo Alto, California. Walton and Martha lived there until 1916.

== Acting career ==
Katherine went by the stage name of Katherine Dayan. Some of her early acting appearances were made at Maguire’s Opera House in San Francisco. Later, Katherine acted in a play titled A Lady of Venice, first in New York City and then in Boston. The play was bought by Buffalo Bill. According to one newspaper columnist's review, Katherine had a "beautiful profile and a lissome figure but was devoid of any acting ability".

== Relationship with Buffalo Bill ==
Katherine first met Bill at one of his shows in England. Bill at first had doubts about Katherine and in a letter to Frank Butler emphasized that "She is too swift and dishonest for me". Bill later recanted his views on Katherine and called her "the finest looking woman in the world". However, when asked about her relationship with Buffalo Bill by the media, Katherine stated that "he was only her dramatic agent and as such had advanced her no funds that had not been repaid". Later in divorce court, her husband Howard Gould accused Katherine of adultery with Bill while Katherine and Howard were married.

== Marriage to Howard Gould ==
Katherine traveled to England in 1891, and there she met Howard Gould. After four years of courtship, they announced their engagement in June 1895. His father, Jay Gould, disapproved of his son's wish to marry Katherine and threatened to take away his son's inheritance. This was not enough to dissuade Howard, and the couple wedded on October 12, 1898, in a private ceremony held in Clemmons' apartment at the Holland House. The low-key reception was at Katherine's request; knowing how ferociously her father-in-law disapproved of their marriage. The wedding cost Howard Gould $5 million out of his inheritance.

The marriage lasted for less than a decade. Howard accused Katherine of adultery with Dustin Farnum and Buffalo Bill. The couple lived separate lives for several years, and the divorce was finalized in 1909. Howard had to pay Katherine $36,000 per year in alimony (approximately $950,000 today). It was the largest alimony settlement at the time.

== Later years ==
After the divorce, Katherine spent much of her leisure days raising thoroughbreds on Blue Gap Farm in Boonsboro, Virginia near Lynchburg. In 1910, Katherine was convinced that someone had tried to poison her three times; however, the doctor found no signs of poison in her system, and her physician diagnosed her with "extreme nervousness". She died at the age of 61 after an illness of several months at Blue Gap Farm on October 24, 1930.
