= Rising Ground =

American nonprofit organization

Rising Ground is a large human services organization in New York City, with approximately 1,600 employees supporting more than 25,000 children, adults, and family members annually.

Founded in 1831 as the Leake and Watts Orphan House, Rising Ground focused on providing child welfare services for much of its existence. Currently, Rising Ground services include child welfare, juvenile justice services, services for people with developmental and intellectual disabilities, special education school programs, services for survivors of gender-based violence, early childhood services, and services for unaccompanied minor children, among others. The organization has approximately 50 programs located at about three dozen sites in New York City and Westchester County, New York. In April 2018, the organization changed its name from Leake and Watts to Rising Ground.

Rising Ground won Gold in The New York Community Trust Non-Profit Excellence Awards 2014, and is the recipient of the Strategy Counts! Award from the national organization, Alliance for Children and Families.

== History ==
The Leake and Watts Orphan House was founded in 1831, and was named after its founder, John Watts, Jr., and his friend John George Leake, a wealthy attorney whose estate provided the funds to build the orphanage. Watts, a former Congressman and Westchester County's first judge, had often discussed with Leake the need for a private non-sectarian institution to assist children in need.

Leake died in 1827, and Watts inherited the estate. Watts used the money to found the Leake and Watts Orphan House. Watts was an active parishioner of Trinity Church (where he is buried), and the Rector of Trinity Church was named the president of the orphanage's Board of Trustees. The relationship between Leake and Watts (now Rising Ground) and the Church exists today. The Rector of Trinity Church retains the option of naming a member to Rising Ground's board. That position is currently held by Dr. Joyce Coppin Mondesire.

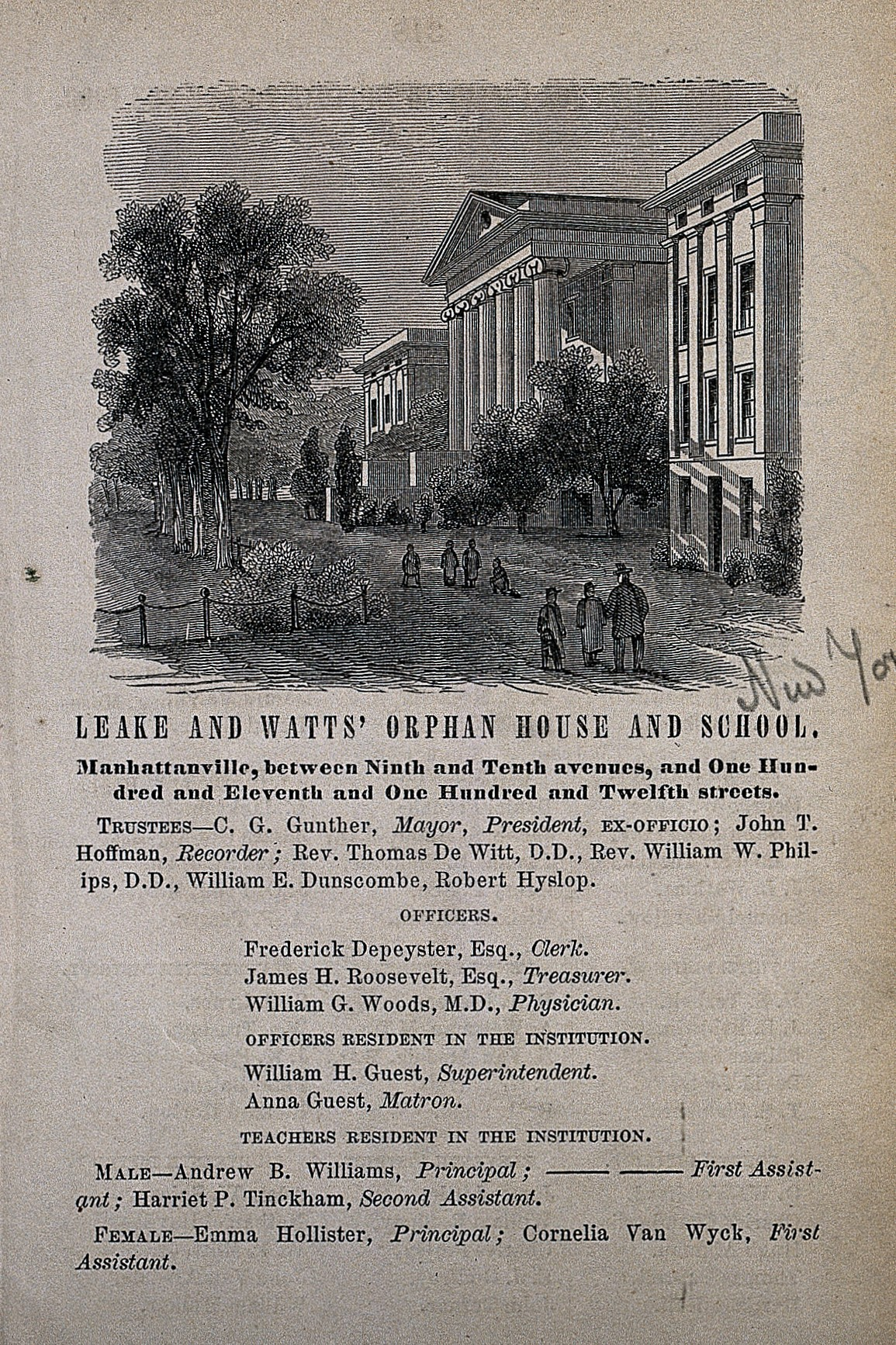
The Leake and Watts Orphan House and School at 112th Street and Amsterdam Avenue

The organization was first located on the grounds of Trinity Church. The trustees voted to relocate from the density of lower Manhattan to more open country in northern Manhattan on the site that is now home to the Cathedral of St. John the Divine. The architect Ithiel Town designed the orphanage for boys at West 112th Street and Amsterdam Avenue in Upper Manhattan. The cornerstone was laid on April 28, 1838, and the building was completed in 1843. The structure resembled a classic Greek temple with space for classrooms and dormitories. In 1850, girls were admitted into the orphanage. The orphanage admitted children ages 3 to 12 and required the children to remain at the orphanage until they were 14 years old. At the time of the Civil War, the cost of provisions per child was 10 cents per day.

=== A free home for full orphans in destitute circumstances ===
In 1884, Andrew Peck, who had lived at the home, formed the Leake & Watts Association of New York City as a fraternal group for men who had been supported by the organization. The association maintained a beneficiary fund for members at a time of sickness or death, as well as to pay for the burial of former Leake and Watts residents whether they were members of the association or not. In 1886, the Leake and Watts Orphan House in the City of New York was described as "A free home for full orphans in destitute circumstances, between the ages of three and twelve; must be bodily and mentally sound; indentured or returned to relatives at the age of 14; unsectarian [sic]; receives children of any nationality or religion; disorderly children not received." By 1886, "1,374 children, 942 males and 432 females, have found shelter and protection beneath this roof since the time of opening, to the present date."

In 1887, the Board of Trustees sold the site to the Episcopal Church, which built the Cathedral of St. John the Divine on the land. The former orphanage building, now known as the Ithiel Town Building, still stands next to the Cathedral. In 1888, the Leake and Watts trustees purchased 33 acres in Yonkers, New York and opened a new home with space for 200 children. Designed by Frederick Law Olmsted, the grounds stood high above the Hudson River. The move to Yonkers was completed in 1890.

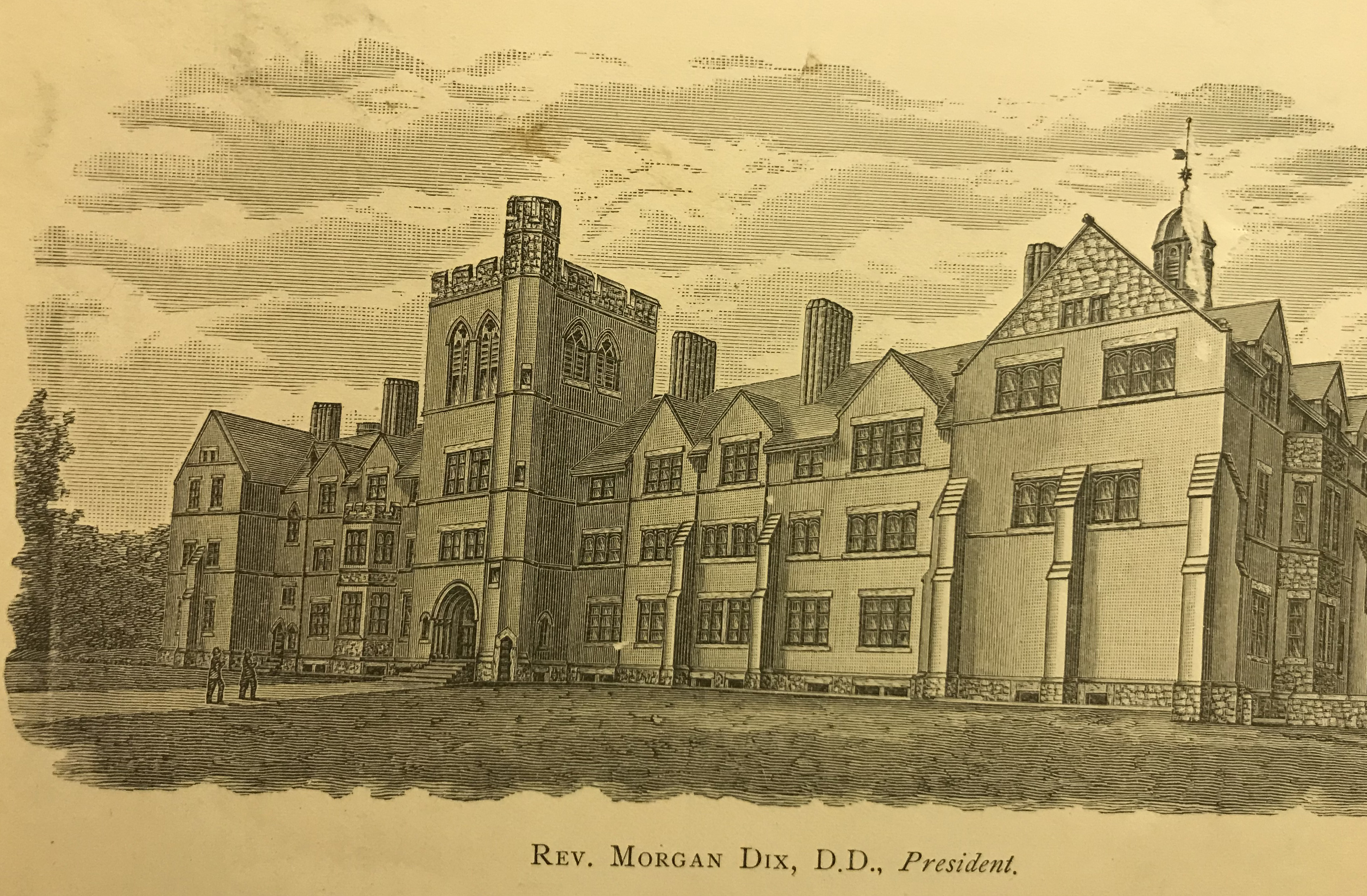
The Leake and Watts Orphan House in Yonkers, New York

A little more than a decade after moving to Yonkers, Leake and Watts became the beneficiary of a 100-acre estate belonging to General John Watts de Peyster, a grandson of John Watts, in 1906. De Peyster named the estate at Tivoli, New York, "Rose Hill Farm". It was used as a summer camp for the 350 boys at Leake and Watts. It was also used year-round as a school for 60 boys who learned about farming.

Leake and Watts' 1918 Annual Report described the toll taken by WW I and the Spanish Flu pandemic on New Yorkers. "The Leake and Watts Orphan House during the year 1918 has cared for the largest family in its history. So many are the children who have been bereft of father or mother, or both, by the war and its consequences or by the influenza epidemic, that like other institutions, we have been almost compelled to stretch our capacity to its utmost limit. To do this, in the face of war conditions, has been, as every one will readily understand, a heavy strain upon our resources."

=== Leake and Watts introduces the cottage system ===
In Yonkers, orphans continued to sleep in dormitories as they had in Manhattan. But that began to change in 1921, when the organization introduced a "cottage system" to provide a home-like setting in which groups of eight to twelve children could live. The first residents were all girls. A donation by philanthropists Edwin and Sarah Gould paid for two of the cottages that Leake and Watts built. One cottage was named for Edwin Gould and the other named for his mother-in-law Hester Shrady. The cottages retain those names today. Edwin Gould was a generous benefactor to Leake & Watts who also funded the construction of Leake and Watts' first swimming pool.

The Andrew Peck Memorial Fund was established in 1927 by his widow with an endowment of $100,762. The income is used to help people go to college and technical school after they leave Leake and Watts.

In 1925, the orphanage made the switch from gaslight fixtures to electrical wiring. By 1931, on the 100th anniversary of its founding, the organization had cared for 4,300 orphans. The population had grown to nearly 500 children, two-thirds of which were boys. In 1937, Leake and Watts opened a Social Service Department and added professionally trained social workers to its staff. That was followed by opening a Foster Home Department in 1944 so that children could be placed in the community.

Katharine Gray Dodge Brownell, a pediatrician, became the first woman elected to the board of directors of Leake and Watts in 1937. To honor her 46 years of service on the board, Leake and Watts opened the Dr. Katharine Dodge Brownell School in the Bronx to provide early childhood education services in 1992.

=== Post-war growth and fundraising ===
A number of Leake and Watts alumni served in WW II, although the exact number is not known, Fourteen of the alumni were killed in action and three were reported missing. Their photos hang in the lobby of Rising Ground's administrative building on the Leake & Watts Campus in Yonkers.

In 1947, the organization merged with two residential human services organizations: the Orphans' Home and Asylum of the Protestant Episcopal Church and the Sevilla-Hopewell Society of Brooklyn, which operated homes for girls. In 1948, fire destroyed the two top floors of the main building on the Yonkers campus.

Leake and Watts fundraisers were frequently mentioned in The New York Times society pages in the 1950s and 1960s. In 1956, the Gilbert and Sullivan Opera Company of New York put on three performances of "The Gondoliers" at the Master Theatre on Riverside Drive and 103rd Street in Manhattan to benefit the home. An article announcing an October 1958 benefit at Yonkers Raceway reported that Leake and Watts was raising money to accommodate more children. At that time, the nonprofit supported about 400 children, of whom 280 lived in foster homes. In a 1965 New York Times article announcing a dinner-dance benefit on the lawn of Gracie Mansion, it was noted that the children's home was supporting 500 children and that then-Mayor Robert Wagner was an ex-officio member of the Leake & Watts' Board of Directors.

=== First in the nation to offer foster care for HIV-positive children ===
In the 1980s as the AIDS epidemic spread, Leake and Watts established a foster program for HIV-positive children. In 1988, Leake and Watts was granted three-year funding for a demonstration program to train other New York City child welfare agencies how to recruit foster families to care for HIV-positive children. Leake and Watts became nationally known for successfully placing and retaining more than 135 HIV-positive chidden in foster homes.

The organization celebrated its 150th anniversary in 1981 with a benefit for 1,500 guests at the Cathedral of St. John the Divine, which featured a musical performance by Max Roach M'Boom and the World Saxophone Quarter. Leake and Watts organized its first symposium ever that year as part of the anniversary celebration on "Institutionalization vs. Community-Based Services."

Leake & Watts opened its East Bronx Family Service Center in 1979 to support vulnerable families with very young children. The center's mission is to "work to strengthen families, prevent child abuse and neglect, and promote the well being of children in their own neighborhoods." In 1982, the Bayes House for girls joined the Leake and Watts' Bronx program. In 1983, the organization's archives were transferred to the New-York Historical Society. Leake and Watts significantly expanded its Bronx programming in the 1980s. The organization opened five early childhood programs to support pre-K children of low-income families in 1987. That same year, the organization that would become Rising Ground established a group home for young expectant and new mothers in foster care and their babies. The program is called Mother & Child.

By its 160th anniversary in 1991, the organization was supporting 2,000 children and families; 112 HIV-infected children were in foster care offered by 73 foster families; a total of 950 children were in foster care, with 101 teens living on the Yonkers campus. That same year, Leake & Watts Children's Home was renamed Leake & Watts Services, Inc.

=== Becoming Rising Ground ===
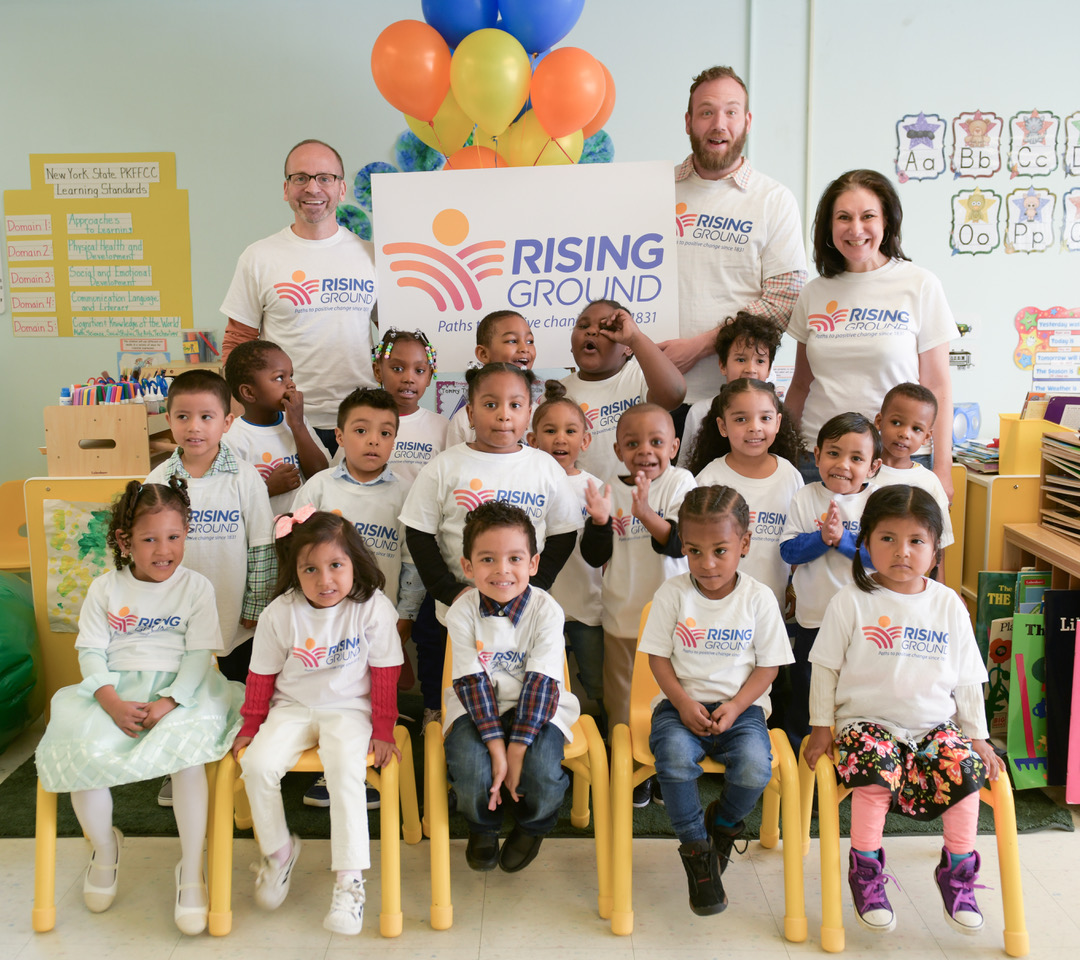
Students at Rising Ground's Brownell School celebrate the organization's new name in 2018.

By 2018, Leake and Watts had evolved from an institution to house orphan children to a large organization with more than 50 programs at more than three dozen sites. That year, the organization changed its name to Rising Ground to reflect the wide scope of its programs. That same year, Rising Ground also reached an agreement with Edwin Gould Services for Children and Families under which Rising Ground assumed all administrative functions for the two organizations. Edwin Gould became a subsidiary of Rising Ground.

In January 2020, Rising Ground announced that it was moving its administrative hub from Yonkers to Downtown Brooklyn to have closer proximity to its many New York City programs. Two months later, New York City became Ground Zero for the first widespread outbreak of COVID-19. Throughout the pandemic, Rising Ground continued operating its residential programs and modified community programs to protect the health of people supported the Rising Ground staff members."Lessons learned from the pandemic" By using Zoom, Rising Ground continued its special education classes, early childhood learning, juvenile justice aftercare program My Next Move, Fatherhood Initiative, and more. Family Foster Care arranged viritual meetings between parents and their children in care, and case planners conducted interviews and home inspections virtually as well. In September, Rising Ground instituted strict protocols to allow more employees to return to their offices and for its educational classrooms open for in-person learning.

Rising Ground celebrated its 190th anniversary in 2021 with a series of events, including a series of lectures looking at the evolution of human services through the lens of New York City's history.

In 2021, Rising Ground announced its intention to sell its Yonkers campus and relocate affected programs to other sites in New York City and Westchester.

In 2023, the 28-acre campus formerly known as Leake & Watts was sold to iPark to create a performing arts and media magnet school. The purchase price was $56.2 million.
