= Northern Metal Company =

Marine terminal in Philadelphia, US

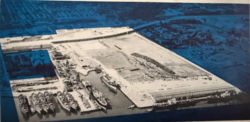
- Type: Private
- Industry: Marine terminal
- Founded: 1933
- Founder: Max Rose
- Defunct: 1970
- Successor: Northern Shipping
- Headquarters: Philadelphia, Pennsylvania

The Northern Metal Company was a privately owned and operated 162-acre deep-water marine facility located in the Port of Philadelphia. It was one of the largest privately owned maritime terminals in the world and was known for its ability to provide a totally integrated stevedoring and terminal operation.

From 1933 to 1970, it was the prime contractor to the Army Transport Service in the Port of Philadelphia and it performed a distinguished service for the Department of Defense.

Northern Metal was founded in 1933 by Max Rose, an immigrant from Pinsk who grew up in Brooklyn who initially worked as a rigger at Sun Shipbuilding and Drydock Co.

== Wartime Operations ==
In 1933, Northern Metal Company opened on a 31-acre riverfront field at Delaware Avenue and Tasker Street. Located on the Delaware River at Tacony in Philadelphia, Northern Metal Company was the only privately owned and operated maritime terminal in the world to be used by the US Military Services.

In 1937, as Germany began reoccupying the Rhineland, the price of scrap metal soared as nations rearmed. Northern Metal Company bought the Girard Smelting and Refining Company plant at Milnor and Bleigh Streets that would be the final site of the company. During World War II, the company diversified by entering the field of terminal operations handling military cargo and performed terminal and stevedoring services in connection with shipments of military cargo under Department of Defense contracts.

The groundwork for Northern Metal’s arrangement as a prime contractor to the Army Transport Service dates back to the early 1940s during World War II. A flood of jeeps, tanks and trucks flowed through Northern Metal then and were processed for shipment and distributed to peers throughout the waterfront.

Northern Metal worked on SS PN Damm, MV Norden, and SS Belvedere during the war.

=== Korean War ===
Since 1951, Northern Metal had almost exclusively reserved its facilities for the military.

During the Korean War, the terminal processed and loaded thousands of military vehicles onto vessels and handled all types of cargo, such as privately owned vehicles, general cargo, steel, and tanks.

The terminal was instrumental in helping to develop the full potential of the roll-on/roll-off vessel GTS Admiral W. M. Callaghan. The vessel operated for six months between Northern Metal Company and the Port of Bremerhaven, Germany. Northern developed procedures for the loading and discharging operations of the vessel, which was operated from the military terminal in Bayonne, N.J.

== Terminal operations ==
Northern Metal Company’s first pier was built in 1935 with the purchase of a drydock from by Bethlehem Steel, which was hauled by tug from New York, and intentionally sunk in 25 feet of water at the edge of the property. The hull was filled in and trackage and cranes were added to handle cargo, enabling the terminal to begin to scrap old vessels. Northern Metal Company had scrapped 1,654 ships by 1965.

In addition to 30 general cargo ships and 11 Navy destroyers, including the HMS Tyler and HMS Hargood, Northern Metal scrapped the 28,000 ton USS Florida in 1932, totaling 200,000 tons.

In 1957, Northern Metal constructed a four-ship terminal on the Delaware River, bringing its total berthing capacity to 9 ocean-going ships. Unusually for the time, this terminal was built with the private capital of the firm instead of with city, state, or port agency funds.

An early IBM system was installed and operated under the direction of the office freight manager that reported receiving and shipping information to a military data control center. This was part of a worldwide system to keep track of all US military cargo while in transit.

Northern Metal Company became Northern Shipping Company after the death of its founder Max Rose. Northern Shipping Company closed in 1993.
