= HMS Hargood (K582) =

Frigate of the Royal Navy

History

United States
- Name: unnamed (DE-573)
- Builder: Bethlehem-Hingham Shipyard, Hingham, Massachusetts
- Laid down: 27 October 1943
- Renamed: USS Hargood (DE-573) 1943
- Namesake: British name assigned in anticipation of transfer to United Kingdom
- Launched: 18 December 1943
- Completed: 7 February 1944
- Commissioned: never
- Fate: Transferred to United Kingdom 7 February 1944
- Acquired: Returned by United Kingdom 23 February 1946
- Stricken: 12 April 1946
- Fate: Removed for scrapping 7 March 1947

United Kingdom
- Name: HMS Hargood (K582)
- Namesake: Admiral Sir William Hargood (1762-1839), British naval officer who was commanding officer of HMS Belleisle at the Battle of Trafalgar in 1805
- Acquired: 7 February 1944
- Commissioned: 7 February 1944
- Identification: Pennant number K582
- Fate: Returned to U.S. Navy 23 February 1946

General characteristics
- Displacement: 1,400 long tons (1,422 t)
- Length: 306 ft (93 m)
- Beam: 36.75 ft (11.2 m)
- Draught: 9 ft (2.7 m)
- Propulsion: Two Foster-Wheeler Express "D"-type water-tube boilers; GE 13,500 shp (10,070 kW) steam turbines and generators (9,200 kW); Electric motors for 12,000 shp (8,900 kW); Two shafts
- Speed: 24 knots (44 km/h)
- Range: 5,500 nautical miles (10,200 km) at 15 knots (28 km/h)
- Complement: 186
- Sensors & processing systems: SA & SL type radars; Type 144 series Asdic; MF Direction Finding antenna; HF Direction Finding Type FH 4 antenna
- Armament: 3 × 3 in (76 mm) /50 Mk.22 guns; 1 × twin Bofors 40 mm mount Mk.I; 7–16 × 20 mm Oerlikon guns; Mark 10 Hedgehog A/S projector; Depth charges; QF 2-pounder naval gun

HMS Hargood (K582) was a Captain-class frigate which served in the Royal Navy during World War II. Laid down as a Buckley class destroyer escort originally intended for the United States Navy, she was transferred to the United Kingdom under the terms of Lend-Lease before she was finished in 1944, serving in the Royal Navy from 1944 to 1946. She was returned to the U.S. Navy in 1946 and sold for scrapping in 1947.

== Construction and transfer ==
The still-unnamed ship was laid down as the U.S. Navy destroyer escort DE-573 by Bethlehem-Hingham Shipyard, Inc., in Hingham, Massachusetts, on 27 October 1943. Allocated to the United Kingdom, she received the British name Hargood and was launched on 18 December 1943. She was transferred to the United Kingdom upon completion on 7 February 1944.

== Service history ==
Commissioned into service in the Royal Navy as HMS Hargood (K582) on 7 February 1944 simultaneously with her transfer, the ship served on patrol and escort duty in the North Atlantic Ocean and off the Normandy beachhead during the invasion of Normandy.

On the night of 3 May 1944 she was attacked by U-548 off the coast of Newfoundland on her first patrol. U-548 fired an acoustic T5 torpedo that missed. A patrolling RCAF B-24 Liberator caused the U-548 to break off the attack and crash dive.

On 28 December 1944 HMS Hargood assisted in rescuing US servicemen from the sinking Empire Javelin in the English Channel.

During June 1945 HMS Hargood was involved in Operation Pledge - the gathering together of surrendered U-boats. She escorted six U-boats [U-3008, U-2356, U-2352, U-2341, U-2336 & U-883) from Wilhelmshaven to Lisahally, Northern Ireland.

The Royal Navy returned her to the U.S. Navy on 23 February 1946.

== Disposal ==
The U.S. Navy struck Hargood from its Naval Vessel Register on 12 April 1946. She was sold to the Northern Metal Company of the Tacony section of Philadelphia, Pennsylvania, for scrapping, and was removed for scrapping on 7 March 1947.
