= Otto Wilhelm Christian Schack =

Danish born American broker (1818–1875)

Otto Wilhelm Christian Schack (1818 – September 1, 1875) was a Danish born American broker.

== Early life ==
Schack was born in Copenhagen, Denmark in 1818. (Note: Schack is sometimes listed as Count Otto Wilhelm Christian Schack, but contemporaneous documents do not refer to him as a Count or a member of the German von Schack family.) He was the youngest son of Gregers Schack (1781–1840) and Anna Sophie Kircksteen (1788–1854). His father was a Counselor of State and Secretary of Finance to the King of Denmark. Among his siblings were the soldier and painter Sophus Schack, and sister Caroline Schack, who married industrialist Lauritz Peter Holmblad.

Otto "received a careful education up to his seventeenth year, when he came to the United States under the charge of Mr. Rudolph Braüm, one of his father's many warm friends. He remained with Braüm until that gentleman's death."

== Career ==
In 1848, he began a career on Wall Street, becoming a broker-dealer and a member of the New York Stock Exchange in 1851. He was associated with Messrs. Jacob Little & Co. for 27 years, the head of which, Jacob Little, was his brother-in-law. A Mason, he was a member of the Cœur de Leon Commandery of the Knights Templar.

== Personal life ==
On August 25, 1841, Schack was married to Elizabeth Inez McCarty (1826–1910), a daughter of Peter McCarty, a descendant of one of the Earls of Clancarty, and Eliza Ann (née Sanders) McCarty. Her sister, Augusta, was married to Jacob Little and was the mother of Lt. William McCarty Little. Together, they lived at 173 Madison Avenue and were the parents of:

- Rudolph Wilhelm Schack (1845–1889), who married Minna Swift Livingston, daughter of Charles James Livingston, in 1879.
- Albert Peter Schack (1847–1926), a graduate of Columbia College School of Mines and professor who died unmarried.
- Constance Elise Schack (1852–1937), who married Col. Archibald Gracie IV, son of Confederate Brig.-Gen. Archibald Gracie III, in 1890. After his death she married Signor Raphael d'Arbiue, a musician and painter who had represented himself as a Count. He fled later, and, Mrs. Gracie said, had taken $5,000 worth of her jewels. It was brought out then that he was not a Count, but a dishwasher."
- Augusta Temple Schack (1853–1920), who married George William Merritt, son of George Merritt, in 1881. After his death she married piano manufacturer William Dalliba Dutton in 1911.

Schack died at his residence in New York City on September 1, 1875. After a funeral at New Jerusalem Church on 35th Street in Manhattan, he was buried at Green-Wood Cemetery in Brooklyn. His widow died on March 5, 1910, at 120 East 25th Street, which was then her residence in New York.
