= Louis Little =

Louis Little may refer to:

- Lou Little (1893–1979), American football player and coach
- Louis M. Little (1878–1960), 11th Assistant to the Major General Commandant of the Marine Corps
