= Atalanta (1883) =

Steam yacht and gunboat

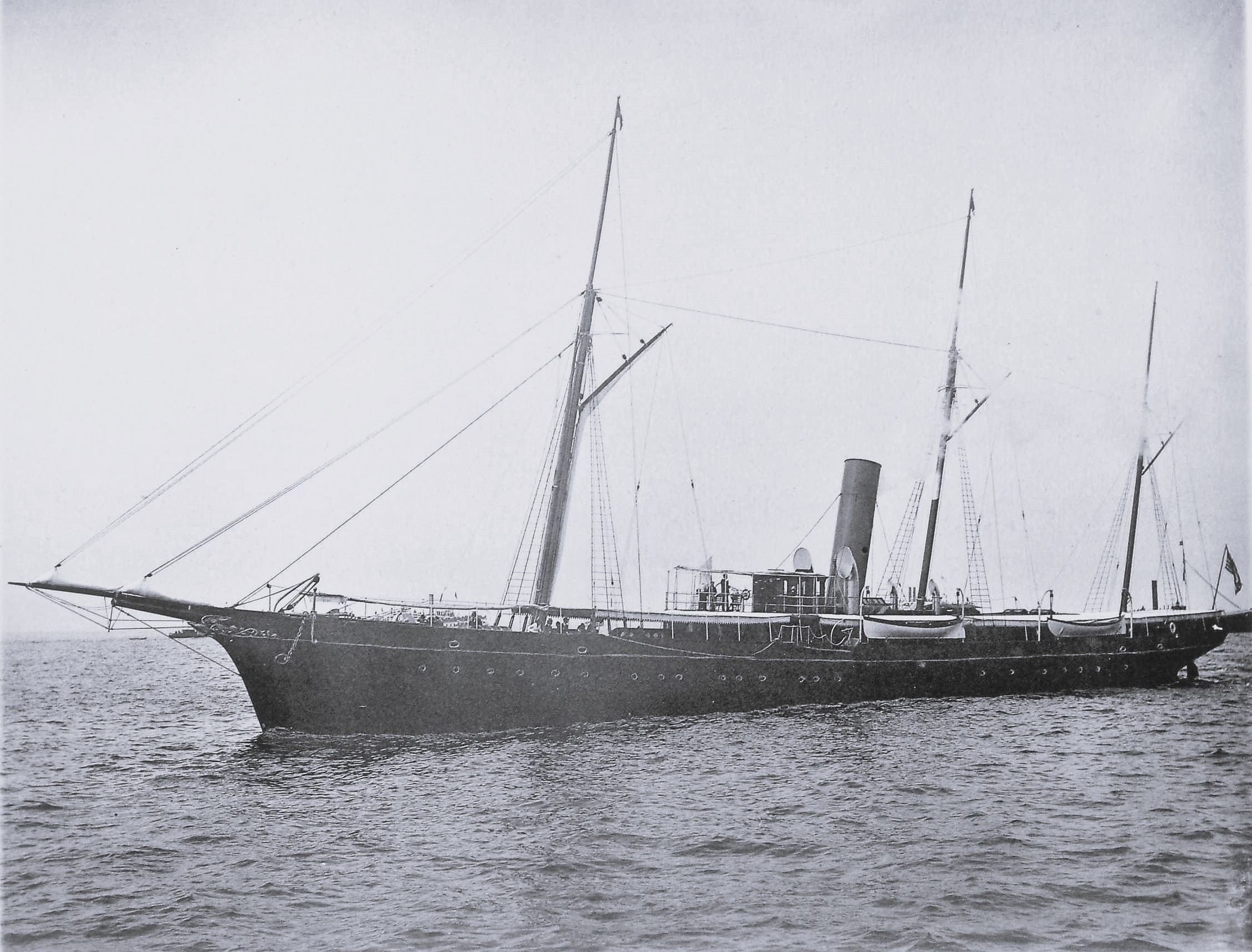
- Atalanta photographed by Nathaniel Stebbins in 1887

History
- Name: Atalanta
- Owner: Jay Gould
- Builder: William Cramp & Sons, Philadelphia
- Fate: Sold to Venezuelan Navy 1900

Venezuela
- Name: Restaurador
- Acquired: 1900

General characteristics as built
- Type: Yacht
- Length: 228 ft (69 m)

Atalanta was a 228-foot (69 m) steam yacht built in Philadelphia by William Cramp & Sons in 1883 for the financier Jay Gould.

== History ==
Atalanta was built by William Cramp & Sons for Jay Gould the same year that American Yacht Club was founded and its inclusion in the club's fleet of steamships was considered a great coup. Although fast, its trans-Atlantic capabilities were limited by its capacity to hold coal, which necessitated a stop at the Azores in order to complete the crossing. It made several trips to England, often mooring at Cowes. Gould famously commuted to work in Manhattan from his Lyndhurst estate in Westchester County, New York, aboard the yacht.

Gould died in 1892, and it was sold to the Venezuelan Navy in 1900 where it served as the gunboat Restaurador (Restorer). It was captured by the Imperial German Navy during the Venezuelan crisis of 1902–03 and put into service under a German flag as part of the blockading squadron. After the crisis, it was returned to the Venezuelans. It was renamed General Salom and continued in service until 1950.

== Gallery ==
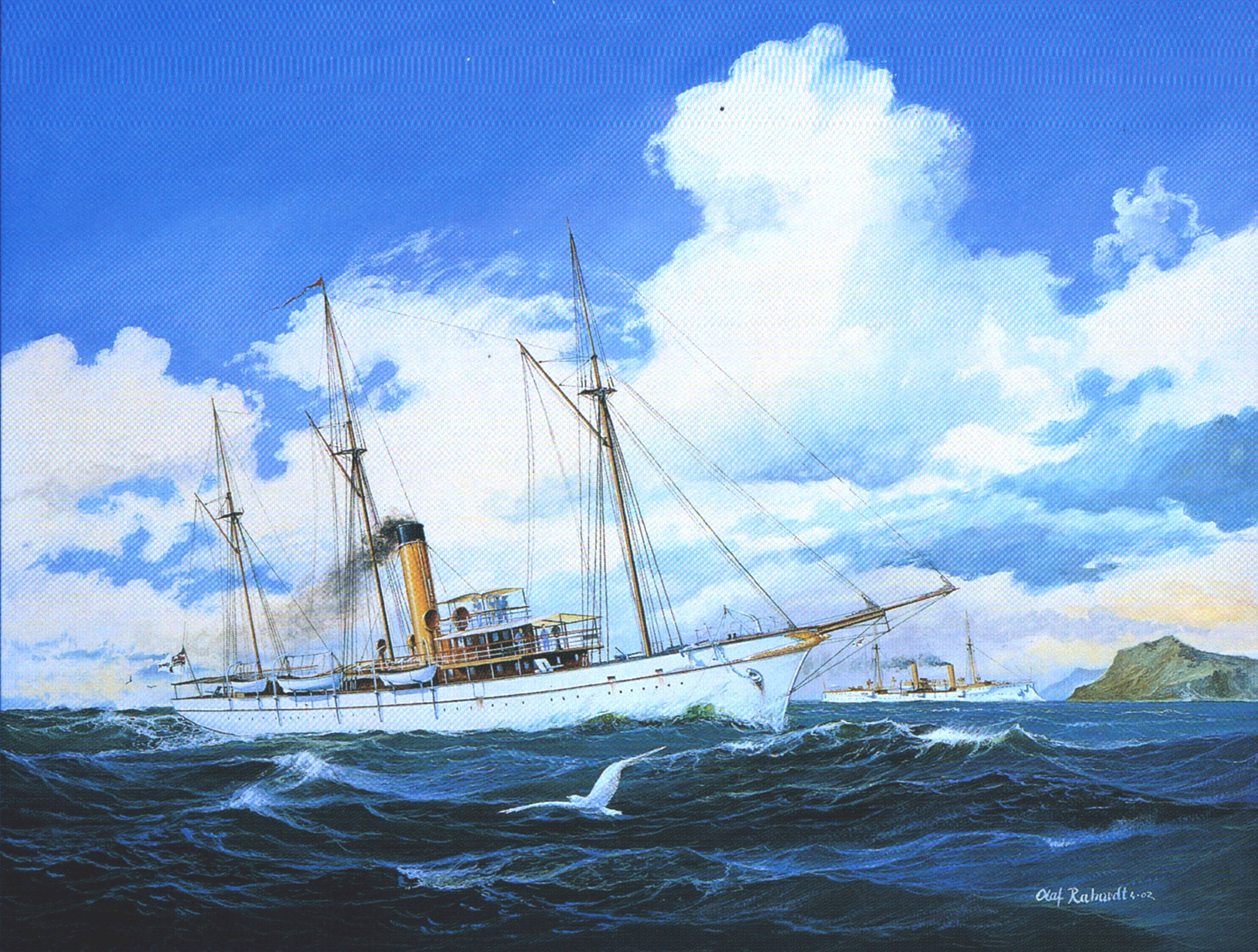
Restaurador, Olaf Rahardt

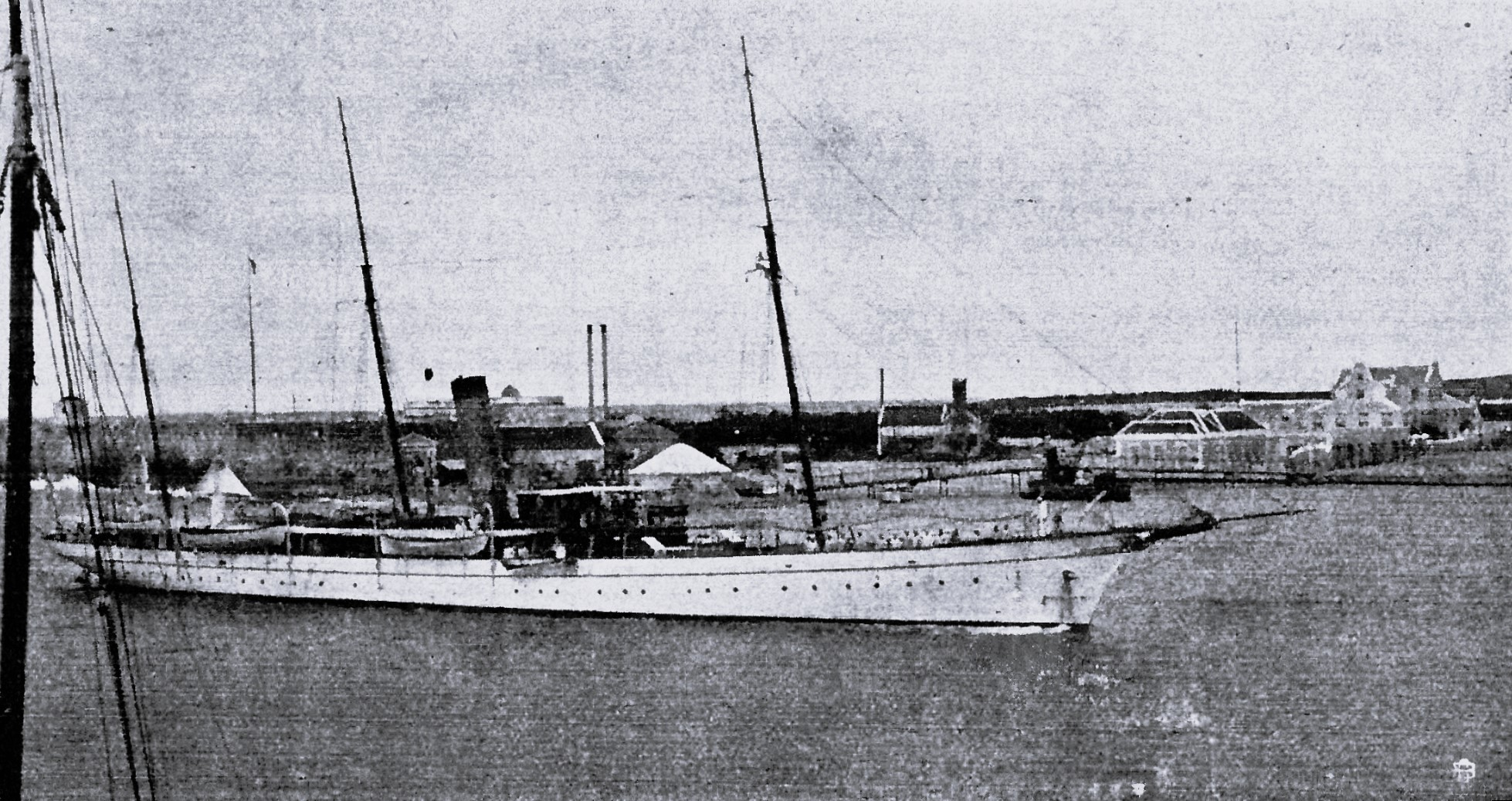
Restaurador - Cura¢ao

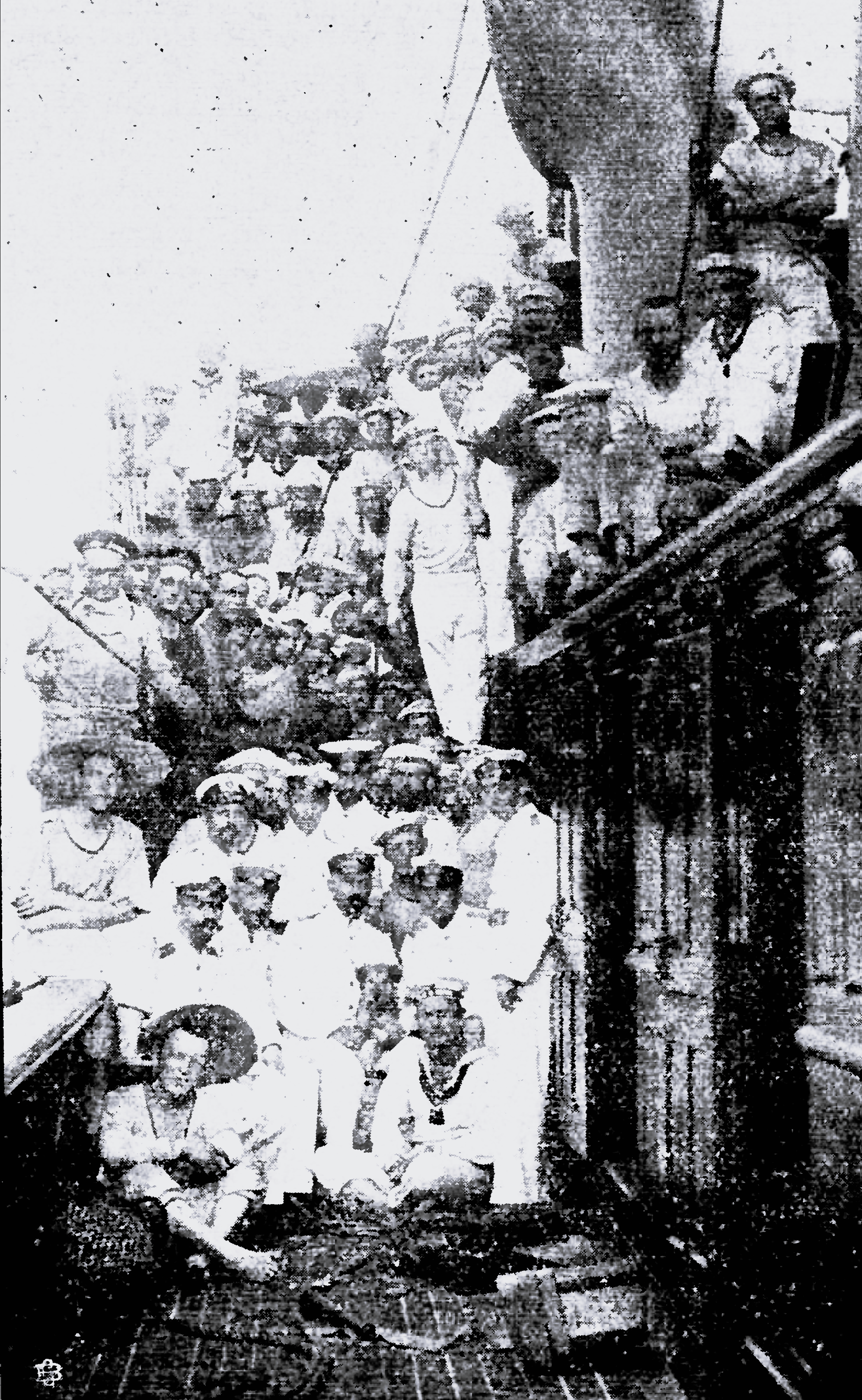
German Crew with Lieutenant Commander Titus Türk (1902)
