= George Merritt (businessman) =

American businessman (1807–1873)

George Merritt (August 14, 1807 – October 5, 1873) was a businessman from New York. He owned the mansion Lyndhurst on the Hudson River, which was sold to financier Jay Gould by Merritt's widow after Merritt's death in 1873.

== Early life ==
Merritt was born on August 14, 1807, in White Creek in Washington County, New York. He was a son of Benjamin Merritt and Thankful (née Scott) Merritt. Beginning at the age of five, was educated at the Friends Boarding School at Nine Partners.

== Career ==
Merritt moved to New York City in 1822 and was a dry goods merchant until 1853, residing six years in Georgia. He was owner and president of the New England Car Spring Co. from 1853 to 1868. The company was known for its pioneering role in introducing railroad car springs made of natural rubber to the American railroad industry.

== Personal life ==
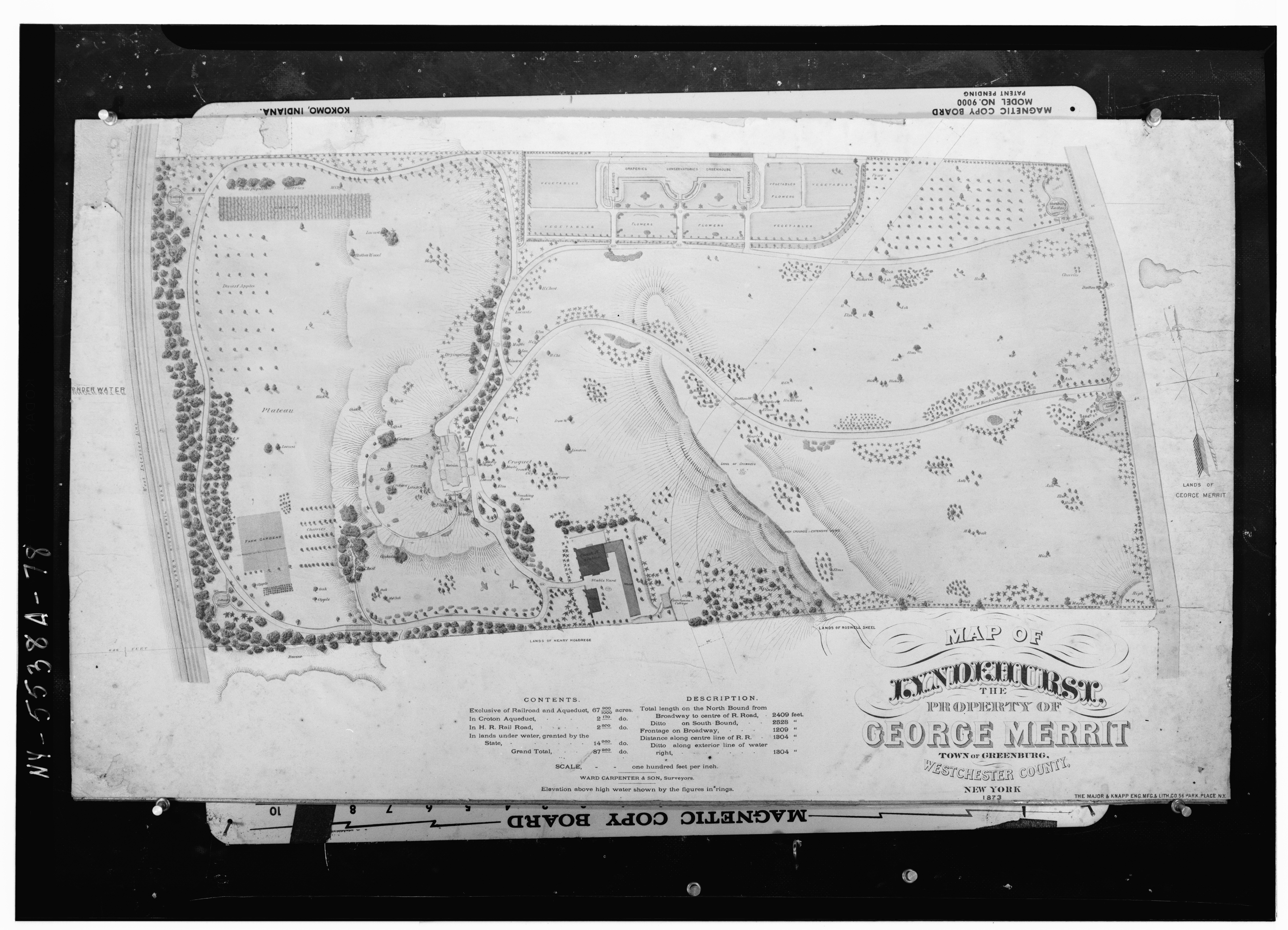
Map of Lyndehurst, 1873

On November 5, 1845, Merritt was married to Julia Douglas (1823–1904), a daughter of Ann (née Sutherland) Douglas (daughter of Solomon Sutherland) and Alanson Douglas, (Note: A prominent attorney and cashier of the Chemical Bank in New York City, President Martin Van Buren invited Alanson Douglas to be United States Secretary of the Treasury, but he declined.) in Troy, New York. She was a direct descendant of Roger Williams, who founded the Colony of Rhode Island and Providence Plantations. Together, they were the parents of six children, four of whom lived to adulthood.

- Douglas Merritt (1847–1927), who married Elizabeth Cleveland Coxe, a daughter of the Rt. Rev. Arthur Cleveland Coxe, Bishop of Western New York, in 1876.
- Julia Douglas Merritt (1859–1892), who married Dr. Benjamin Franklin Dawson in 1884.
- Annie Douglas (1849–1849), who died young.
- Mary Merritt (1850–1911), who married John Peter Haines, president of the American Society for the Prevention of Cruelty to Animals, in 1873.
- Cornelia Merritt (1853–1853), who died young.
- George William Merritt (1856–1907), who was married three times, (Note: One of George William Merritt's marriages was in 1881 to Augusta Temple Schack (1853–1920), the youngest daughter of Danish broker Otto Wilhelm Christian Schack.) and was separated from his third wife, Alma Desajo, when he took his own life at the Fifth Avenue Hotel in New York City.

Merritt died of Bright's disease on October 5, 1873, at his Lyndhurst mansion. After a funeral at the Irvington Parish Church, he and was buried at Sleepy Hollow Cemetery.

=== Lyndhurst ===
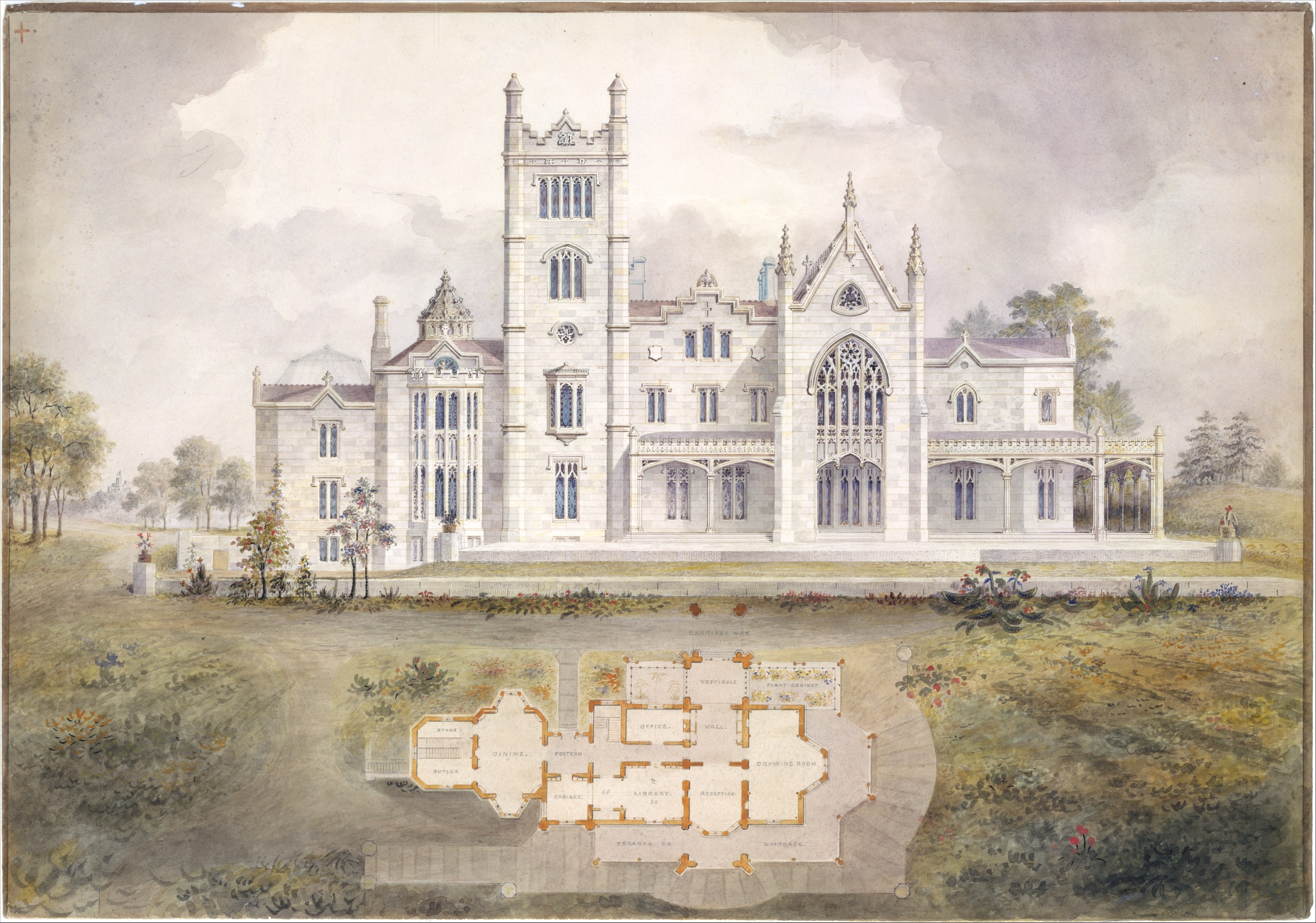
Lyndhurst

In 1864 Merritt bought Knoll, the former country estate of William S. Paulding Jr. and hired architect Alexander Jackson Davis to expand the estate, doubling the house's size in the Gothic Revival style between 1864 and 1865, renaming it "Lyndenhurst" for the estate's linden trees. His new north wing added an imposing four-story tower, new porte-cochere (the old one was reworked as a glass walled vestibule) and a new dining room, two bedrooms, and servants quarters. After his death, his widow, Julia sold the Irvington house to financier Jay Gould.
