= Lyndhurst (estate) =

Historic estate in New York, United States

- Lyndhurst (Jay Gould Estate)
- U.S. National Register of Historic Places
- U.S. National Historic Landmark
- New York State Register of Historic Places
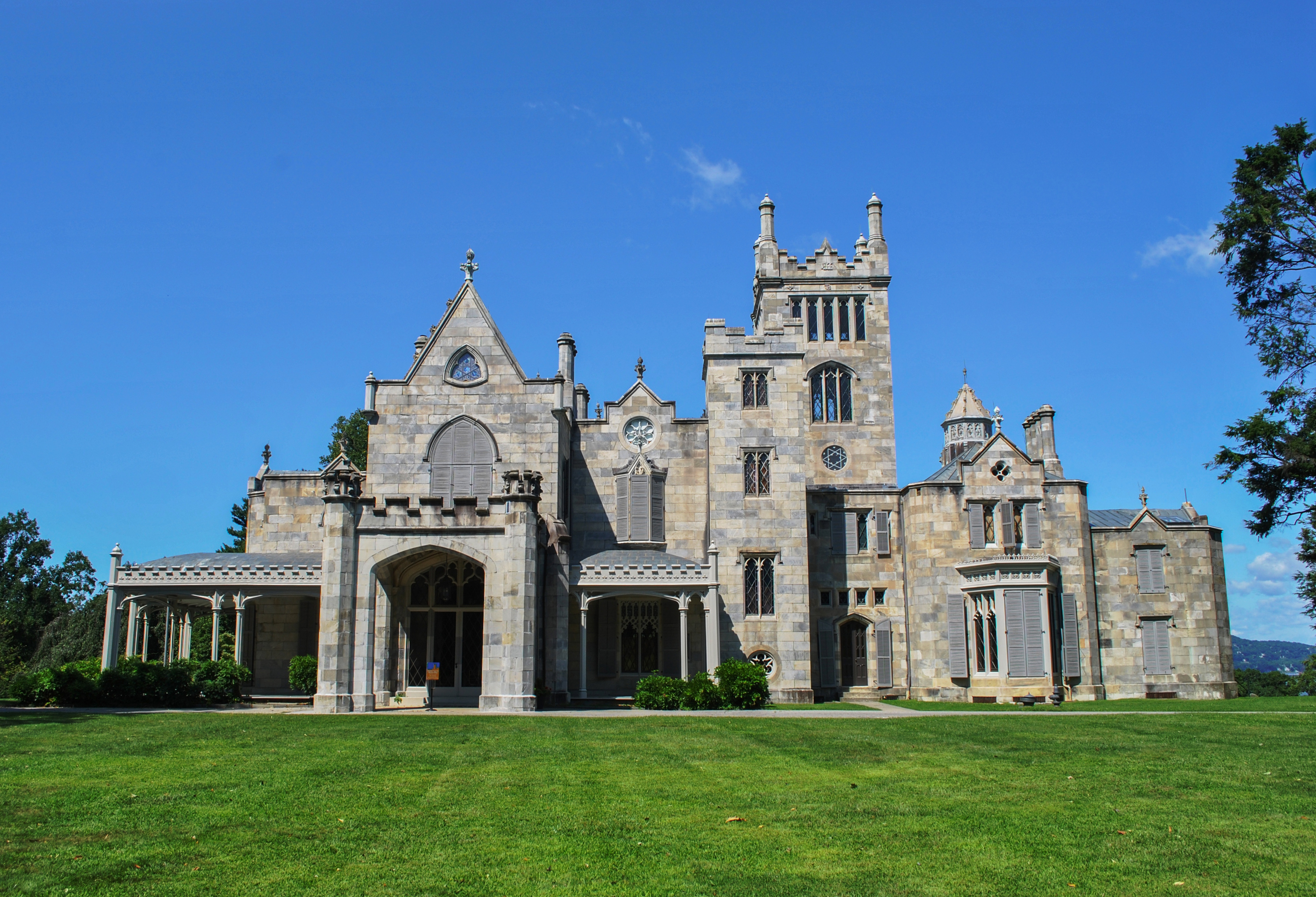
- The front facade of Lyndhurst
- Interactive house showing Lyndhurst’s location
- Location: Tarrytown, New York, U.S.
- Nearest city: White Plains, New York, U.S.
- Coordinates: 41°03′14.3″N 73°52′02.2″W
- Area: 67 acres (27 ha)
- Built: 1838
- Architect: Alexander Jackson Davis
- Architectural style: Gothic Revival
- Website: www.lyndhurst.org
- NRHP reference No.: 66000582
- NYSRHP No.: 11950.000006

Significant dates
- Added to NRHP: November 13, 1966
- Designated NHL: November 13, 1966
- Designated NYSRHP: June 23, 1980

Lyndhurst, also known as the Jay Gould estate, is a Gothic Revival country house that sits in its own 67-acre (27 ha) park beside the Hudson River in Tarrytown, New York, about a half mile south of the Tappan Zee Bridge on US 9. The estate was designated a National Historic Landmark in 1966. One of the best-preserved examples of 19th-century American decorative arts, architecture, and landscaping, it is part of Westchester County's historical Millionaires' Row.

== History ==
The mansion was designed in 1838 by Alexander Jackson Davis and completed in 1842. The estate and the mansion were owned in succession by New York City mayor William Paulding Jr., merchant George Merritt, railroad tycoon Jay Gould, and Gould's daughters, prominent philanthropist Helen Miller Gould Shepard, and socialite Anna Gould.

Paulding, who was born in the Tarrytown area, bought the property as a summer retreat. He named his house "Knoll", although critics quickly dubbed it "Paulding's Folly" because of its unusual design that includes fanciful turrets, pointed arches, and asymmetrical outline, which was considered eccentric in the post-colonial era. Stone blocks for its limestone exterior were quarried by prisoners at nearby Sing Sing prison (in present-day Ossining, New York).

Merritt, the estate's second owner, engaged Davis as his architect, and in 1864–1865 doubled the size of the house to 14,000 sq ft (1,300 m^{2}), renaming it "Lyndenhurst" after the estate's linden trees. Davis' new north wing included an imposing four-story tower, a new porte-cochere (the old one was reworked as a glass-walled vestibule), a new dining room, two bedrooms and servants' quarters.

A member of the prominent Gould family and one of the wealthiest people in the United States, Jay Gould purchased the property in 1880 to use as a country house. He shortened its name to "Lyndhurst", which he sometimes spelled "Lindhurst", and occupied it until he died in 1892. Gould's elder daughter, Helen Miller Gould Shepard, made an indelible mark on the estate and its legacy by repurposing some buildings and constructing several new ones to serve the local Tarrytown community and charitable causes. In 1961, Gould's other daughter, Anna Gould, donated the estate to the National Trust for Historic Preservation. The property is now open to the public.

== Architecture and Grounds ==
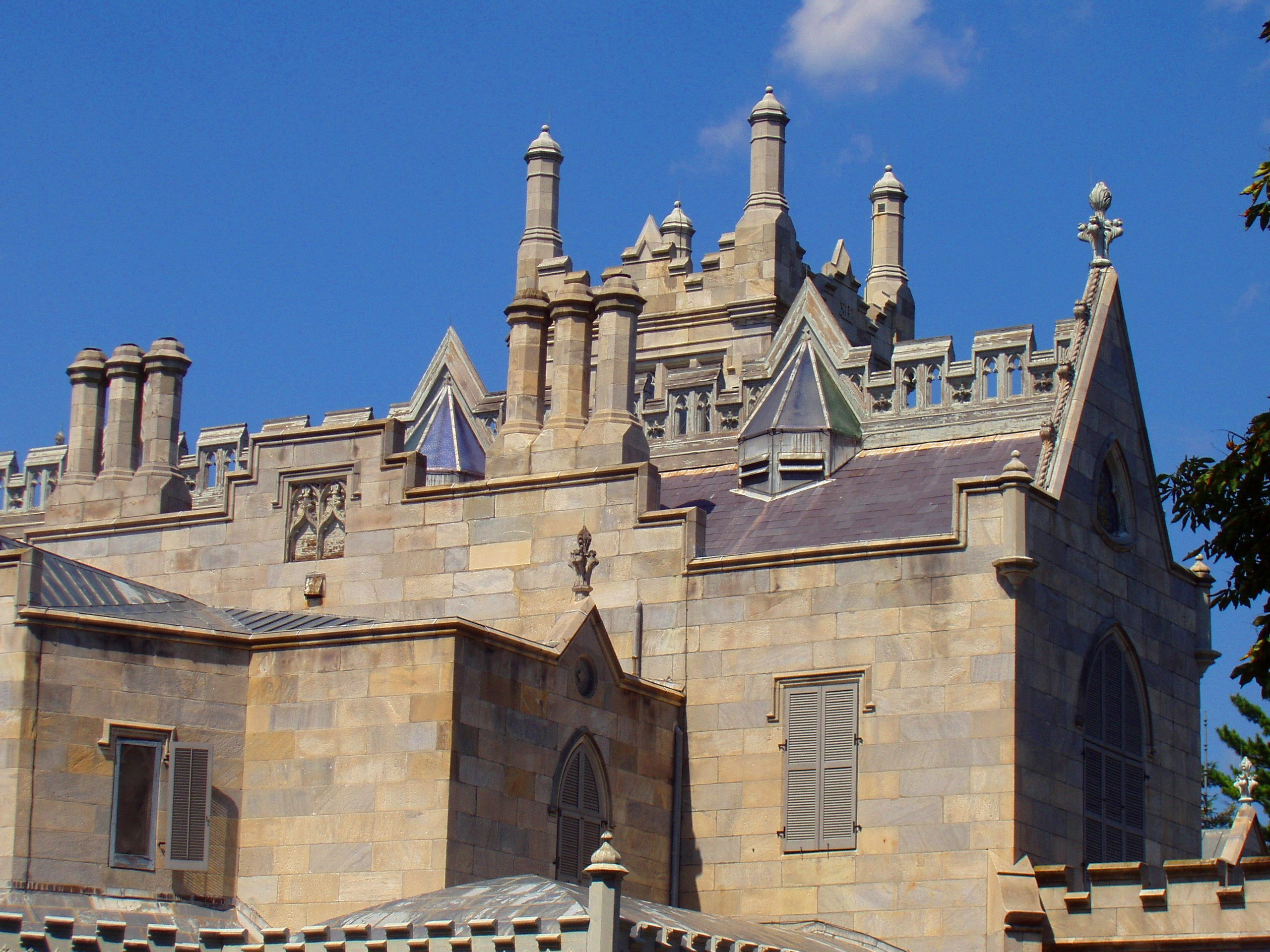
Architectural detail of Lyndhurst

The mansion's rooms are strongly Gothic in character. Hallways are narrow, windows small and sharply arched, and ceilings are fantastically peaked, vaulted, and ornamented. The effect is at once gloomy, somber, and highly romantic; the large, double-height art gallery provides a contrast of light and space.

The well-preserved beehive-domed root cellar, six-room basement kitchen, and stand-alone laundry building offer a behind-the-scenes look at the inner workings of a Gilded-Age mansion. The house sits within a landscape park, designed in the English naturalistic style by Bavarian-born master gardener Ferdinand Mangold, whom Merritt hired and who would work for four generations of Lyndhurst owners. Mangold drained the surrounding swamps, created lawns, planted specimen trees, orchards, and gardens, and built a large Gothic Revival greenhouse. The park is an outstanding example of 19th-century landscape design with a curving entrance drive that reveals "surprise" views of rolling lawns accented with shrubs and trees, as well as Victorian-style rockeries and seating areas placed across the grounds to capture views of the Hudson River.

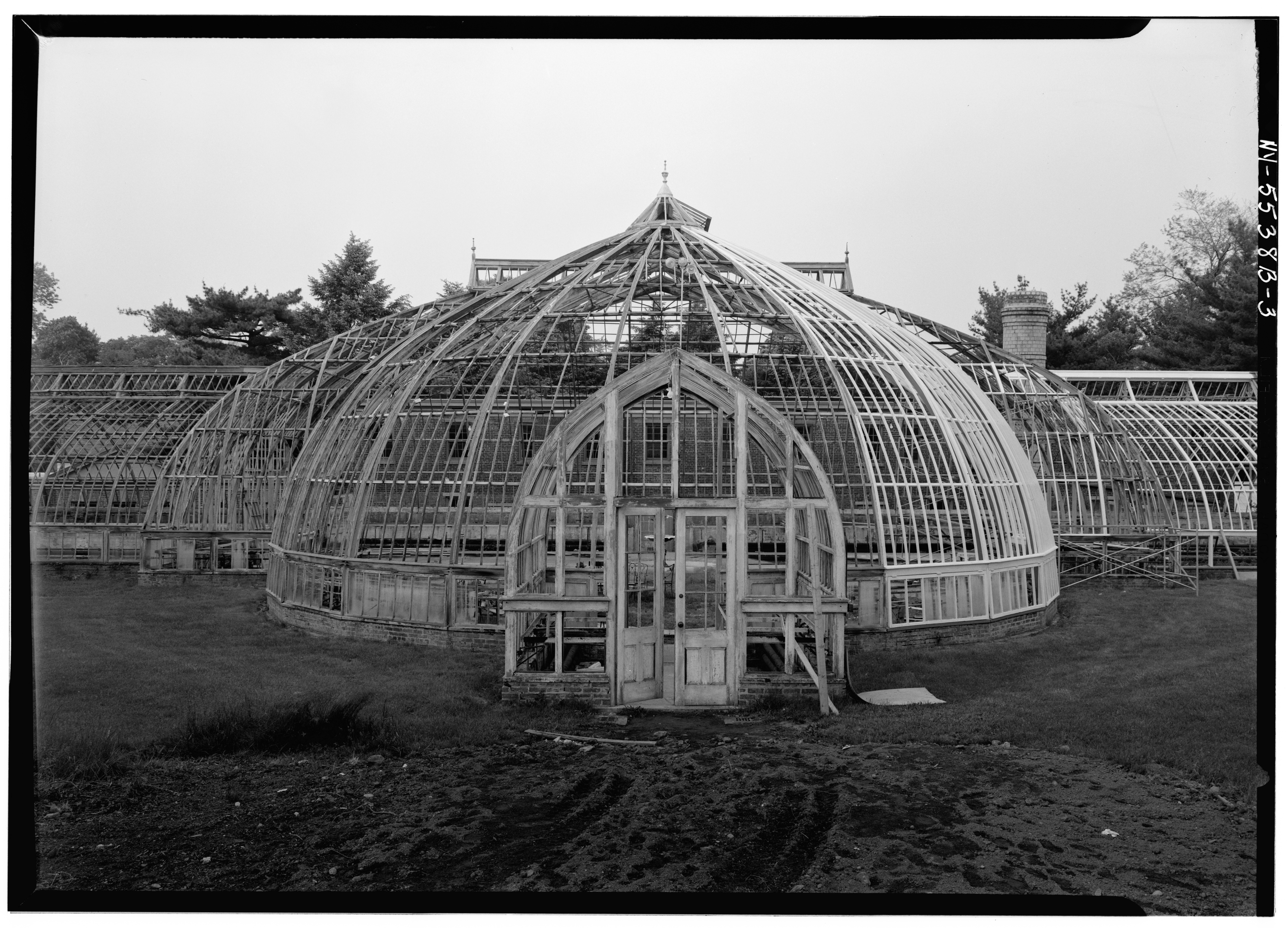
Central pavilion of the conservatory (1971)

The 390-foot-long (120 m) onion-domed, iron-framed, glass conservatory was built in 1881 by Lord & Burnham, after the original one burned down. It was one of the largest privately owned greenhouses in the United States when constructed and was famous for its orchid specimens and massive night-blooming cereus cacti.

Other historically and architecturally significant structures on Lyndhurst grounds include the Shingle-style Recreational Pavilion (better known as Bowling Alley), one of the oldest regulation-sized bowling alleys in the world, built in 1894; an elaborate swimming pool building, built in 1911; and the Rose Cottage, constructed around 1912 as a children's playhouse. These and some other buildings on the property were built by Jay Gould's daughter, Helen Miller Gould Shepard.

Today, two major long-distance walking trails, the linear Old Croton Aqueduct State Historic Park and the Westchester RiverWalk, run through the grounds of Lyndhurst.

== Role of Helen Miller Gould Shepard ==
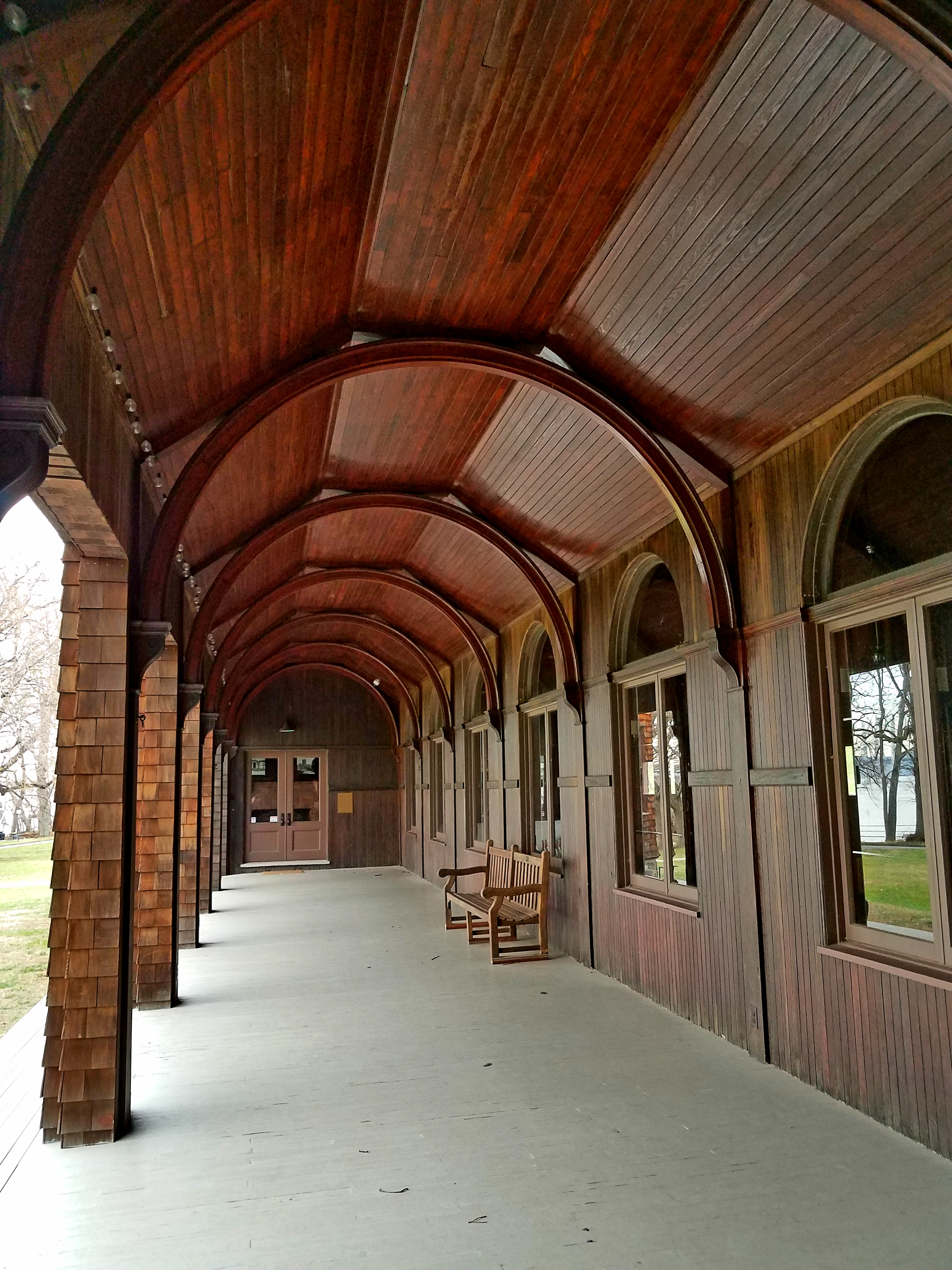
Outside gallery of the bowling alley building

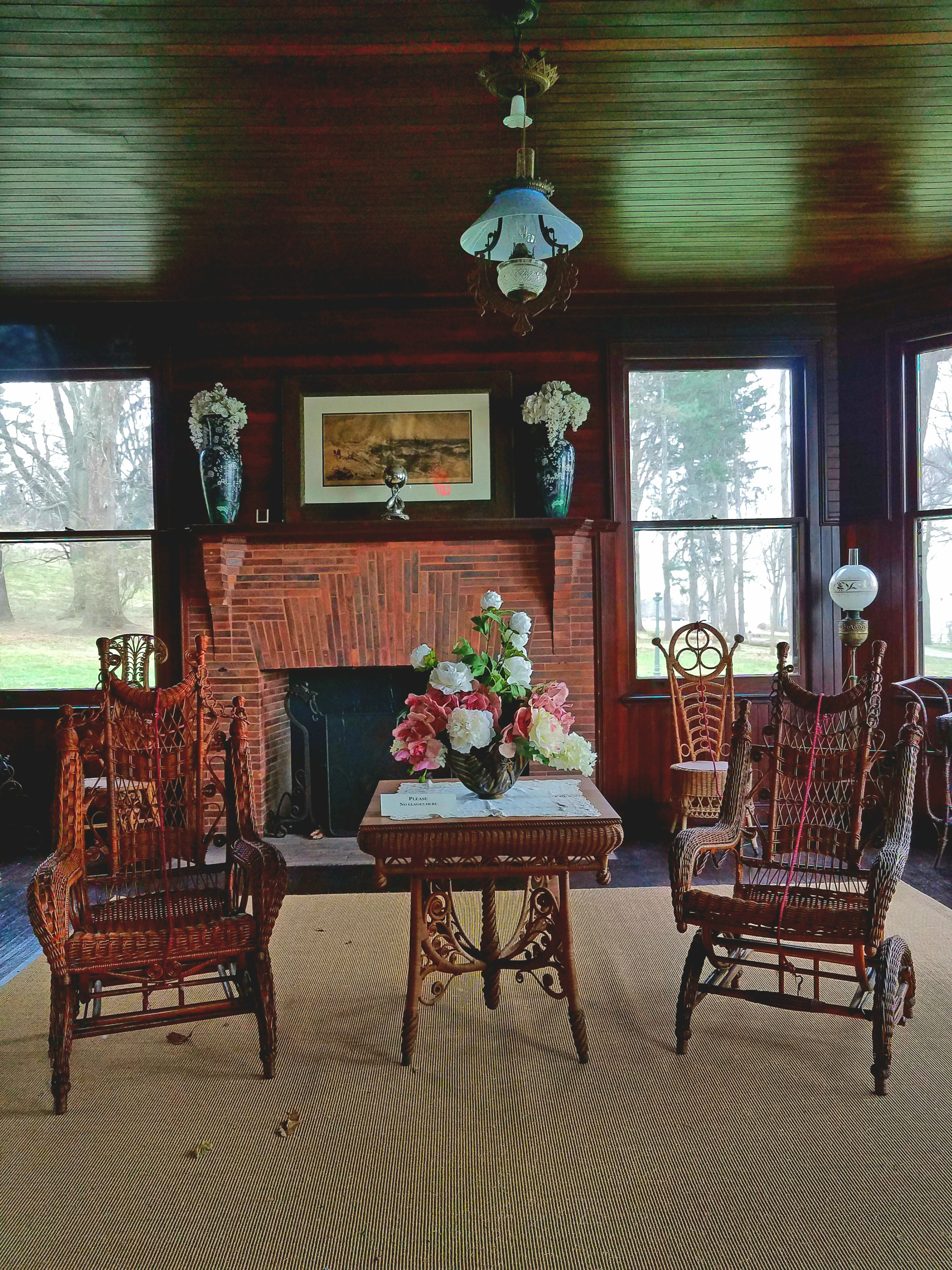
One of the two parlors of Lyndhurst's bowling alley building used for a sewing school (partial view)

Helen Miller Gould Shepard, Jay Gould's firstborn daughter, spent much of her childhood in Lyndhurst. After her father's death in 1892 (her mother had died three years prior), she found herself the caretaker of her younger siblings and the estate at the age of 24, formally purchasing Lyndhurst in 1899. To be able to independently manage the estate and her large inheritance, she graduated from New York University School of Law. She would become a prominent philanthropist, earning the sobriquet "America's Sweetheart." At Lyndhurst, she re-shaped the property by repurposing some structures and constructing several new buildings to serve her charitable endeavors. These included, among others, the bowling alley, laundry building, kennel, and swimming pool.

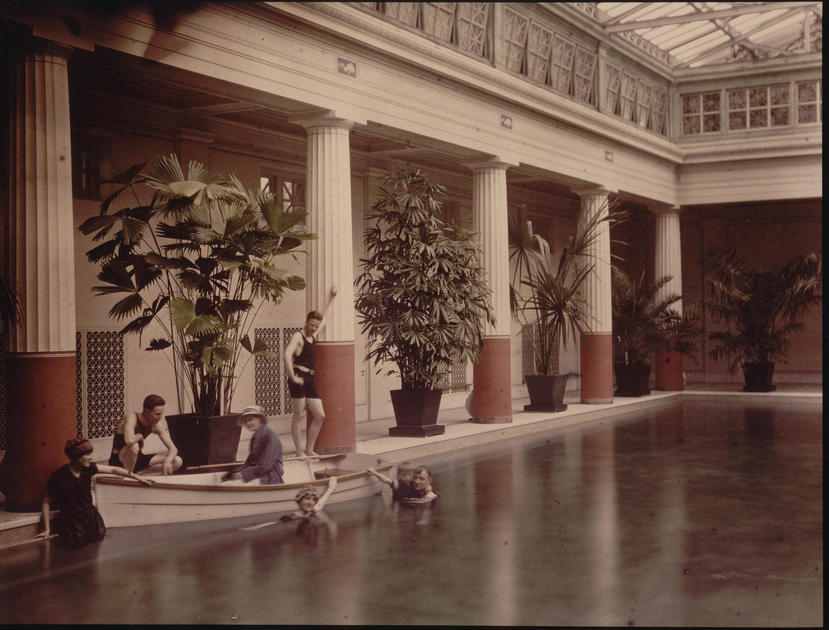
Helen Miller Gould Shepard (in the boat) in her Lyndhurst pool, with husband (holding their son Finley), two other family members, and two lifeguards; c. 1920

A proponent of women's equality, she built the bowling alley because bowling was one of the few sports in which women and men could participate on equal terms at the time. In the octagonal parlors flanking the building, she opened a sewing school for young local women; in the kennel building, a cooking school; in the carriage house, a carpentry school for boys; and in the laundry building, educational classes for Lyndhurst staff. Also on the estate grounds, she established Woody Crest, a "fresh-air farm" for disabled and underprivileged children.

Her large swimming pool house (or natatorium, as swimming pools were called at the time) was built in 1911 in the style of a Roman bath, popular at the time. It had a soaring glass roof held up by steel trusses; the indoor pool was surrounded by columns and had mosaic tiled floors. Known as "Helen's Bath", it was open to local residents six days a week and had full-time lifeguards. Swimming instructions were provided to boys and girls (young girls, at the time, had little opportunity to learn to swim). Her decision to build a publicly accessible pool was prompted by the 1904 General Slocum disaster, in which hundreds of women and children, unable to swim, drowned.

During the Spanish–American War, Helen had worked in a hospital for wounded soldiers in New York City and hosted convalescing soldiers on the estate. During World War II, Helen's younger sister, Anna Gould, Duchess of Talleyrand-Périgord, who was the last private owner of Lyndhurst, would also use its buildings to provide convalescence for soldiers and seamen returning home.

== Preservation and Restoration ==
When Jay Gould purchased the property in 1880, he left the exterior of the mansion essentially intact, updating only the décor and some of the furniture. More than fifty pieces of the original furniture designed by the architect of the house, Alexander Jackson Davis, are still on display in the mansion. Neither of the Gould daughters made any changes to the exterior and only minor renovations to the interior of the main house, making it one of the best-preserved Gilded-Age mansions when it was donated by Anna Gould to the National Trust for Historic Preservation in 1961.

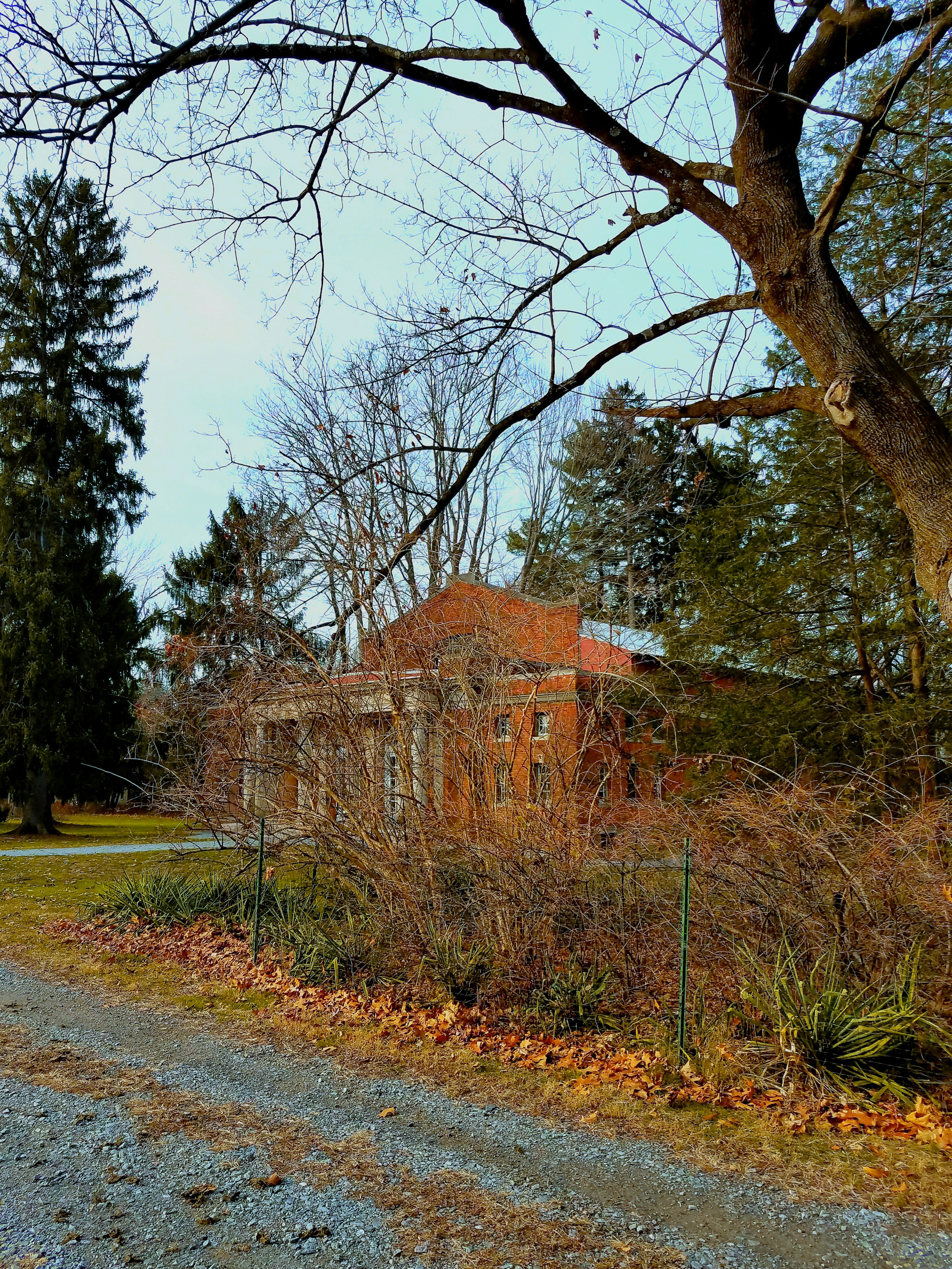
Swimming pool building in 2020

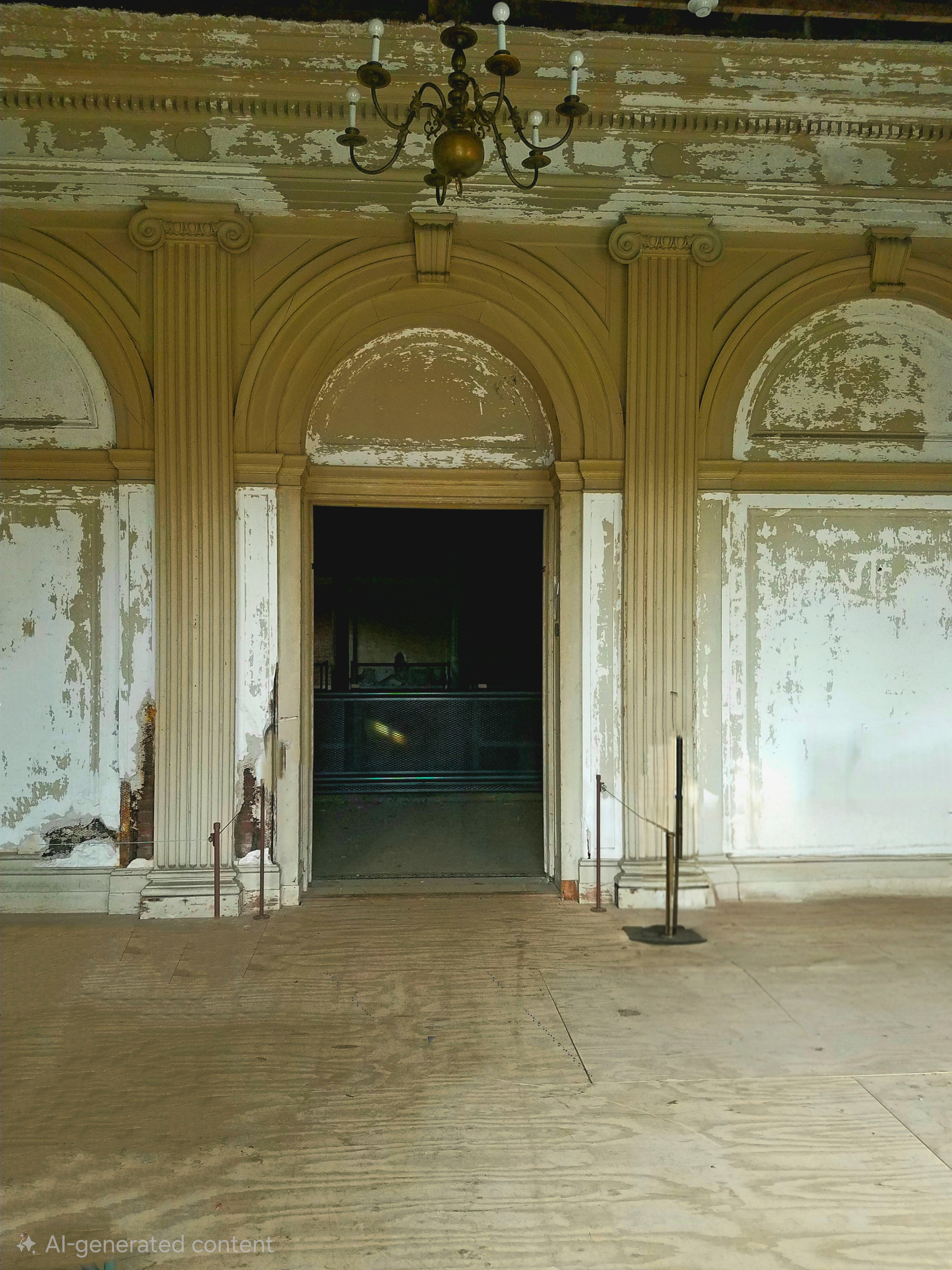
Entry lounge of the Lyndhurst swimming pool building in 2020

The grounds have been undergoing long-term restoration. Partially lost specimen trees and gardens are being reintroduced. Original garden furniture is being restored or replaced. Helen Gould's prized rose garden was restored in the 1970s by the Garden Club of Irvington, which continues to maintain it.

Lyndhurst's conservatory restoration is an ongoing, multi-phase effort. Fifteen other buildings on the property, including the historic bowling alley, have been fully restored. Also restored was the bridge over railroad tracks to the Hudson River, built by Jay Gould to board his steam yacht Atalanta, aboard which he famously commuted from Lyndhurst to work in Manhattan.

Helen's Bath, the only surviving early 20th-century swimming pool building in New York state, remained abandoned for decades after the lack of coal for its heating system during World War II made its upkeep impossible. In 2020, the Historic Preservation Fund awarded Lyndhurst a $750,000 grant to stabilize and preserve the pool. Stabilization of the roof and building structure was completed in 2023. According to Emma Gencarelli, Lyndhurst's collections coordinator, the building "will likely never be used as a swimming pool again, but as Helen conceived it as a building with purpose, it will find that again."

== In popular culture ==
- ABC's holiday television film The Halloween That Almost Wasn't (1979), a.k.a. The Night Dracula Saved the World, was shot here. The scenes were used as the backdrop for both Count Dracula and the Witch's castle. It later aired on the Disney Channel during its Halloween season, until the late 1990s.
- From 1991 until the program changed filming locations from New York to Los Angeles in 2009, Lyndhurst served as the exterior of “Wildwind,” the home of Dimitri Marick, in establishing shots on the ABC daytime drama All My Children. Elements of Lyndhurst's interior architecture influenced the design of the Wildwind sets.
- Lyndhurst was the set for the movies House of Dark Shadows (1970) and Night of Dark Shadows (1971), both based on the gothic soap opera Dark Shadows. It is also seen in Reversal of Fortune (1990) and Gloria (1999).
- Episode of the History Channel's miniseries docudrama The Men Who Built America, featuring a portrayal of Jay Gould, was filmed at Lyndhurst in the summer of 2012.
- Winter's Tale (2013) was filmed at Lyndhurst in January 2013.
- Lyndhurst was featured on Season 1, Episode 3 of Travel Channel's Castle Secrets & Legends series (original airdate February 9, 2014).
- Lyndhurst was also used as a filming location for ABC's Forever in 2014, using the cottage on the property for exterior shots.
- Lyndhurst's landscape, bowling alley, and mansion interior were used as a filming location for NBC's The Blacklist, starring James Spader.
- In 2017, the Lifetime series Project Runway filmed an episode at Lyndhurst, challenging the designers to draw inspiration from the exteriors and gardens.
- The 2021 and 2022 Westminster Kennel Club Dog Show was held outdoors at Lyndhurst on account of concerns about the COVID-19 pandemic in New York City.
- Lyndhurst serves as a filming location for The Gilded Age. The mansion interior serves as the home of the character Aurora Fane and her husband, and the Lyndhurst Carriage House is the location of the New York Globe offices. Season 1 also featured the Lyndhurst grounds and greenhouse. The ferry terminal in the series' premiere episode was modeled after the Lyndhurst Bowling Alley.
- Arcadia, the 2014 debut album by the American singer-songwriter and producer Caroline Polachek, under the pseudonym Ramona Lisa, depicts the mansion on the album cover.

== Gallery ==
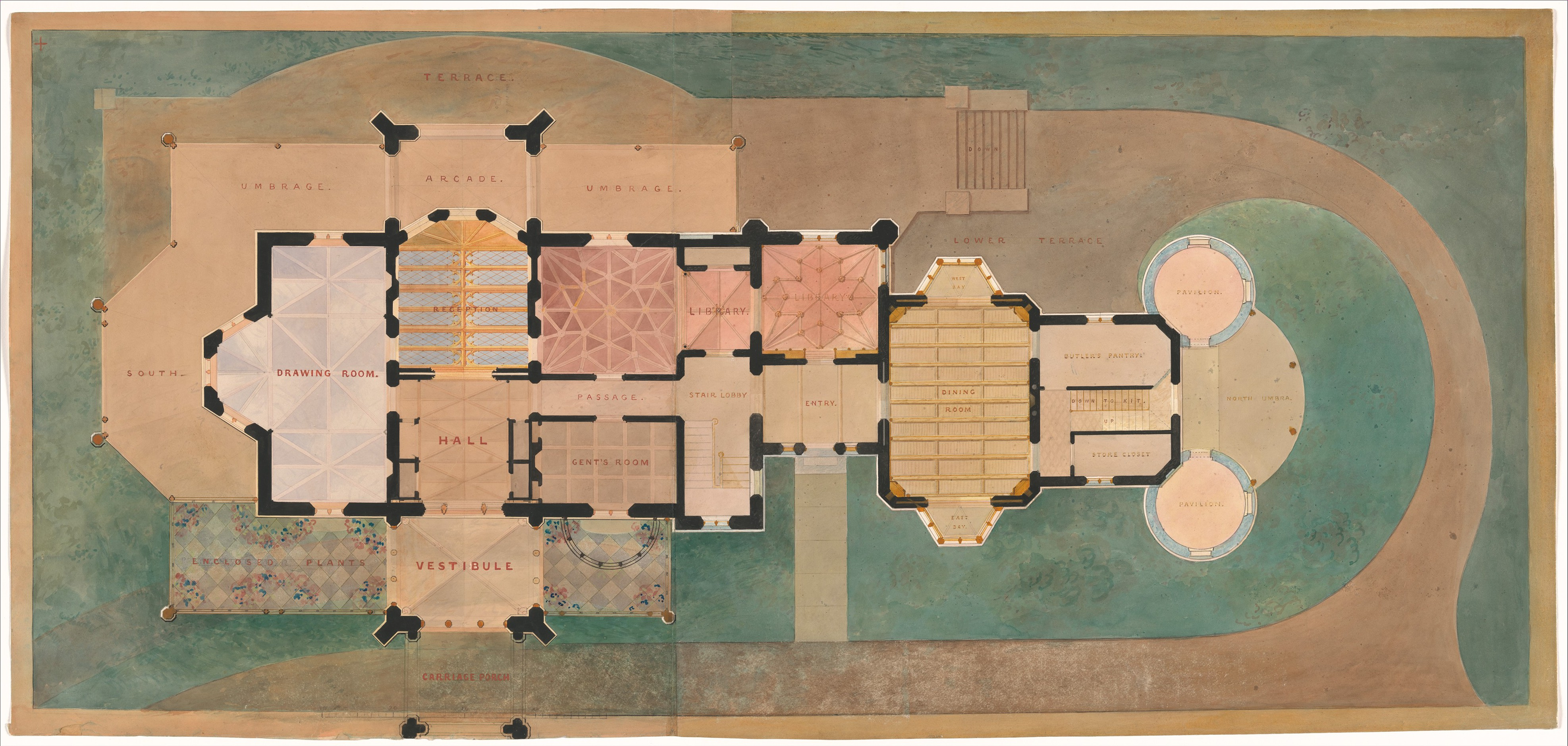
Alexander Jackson Davis's 1st-floor plan of the house, 1865

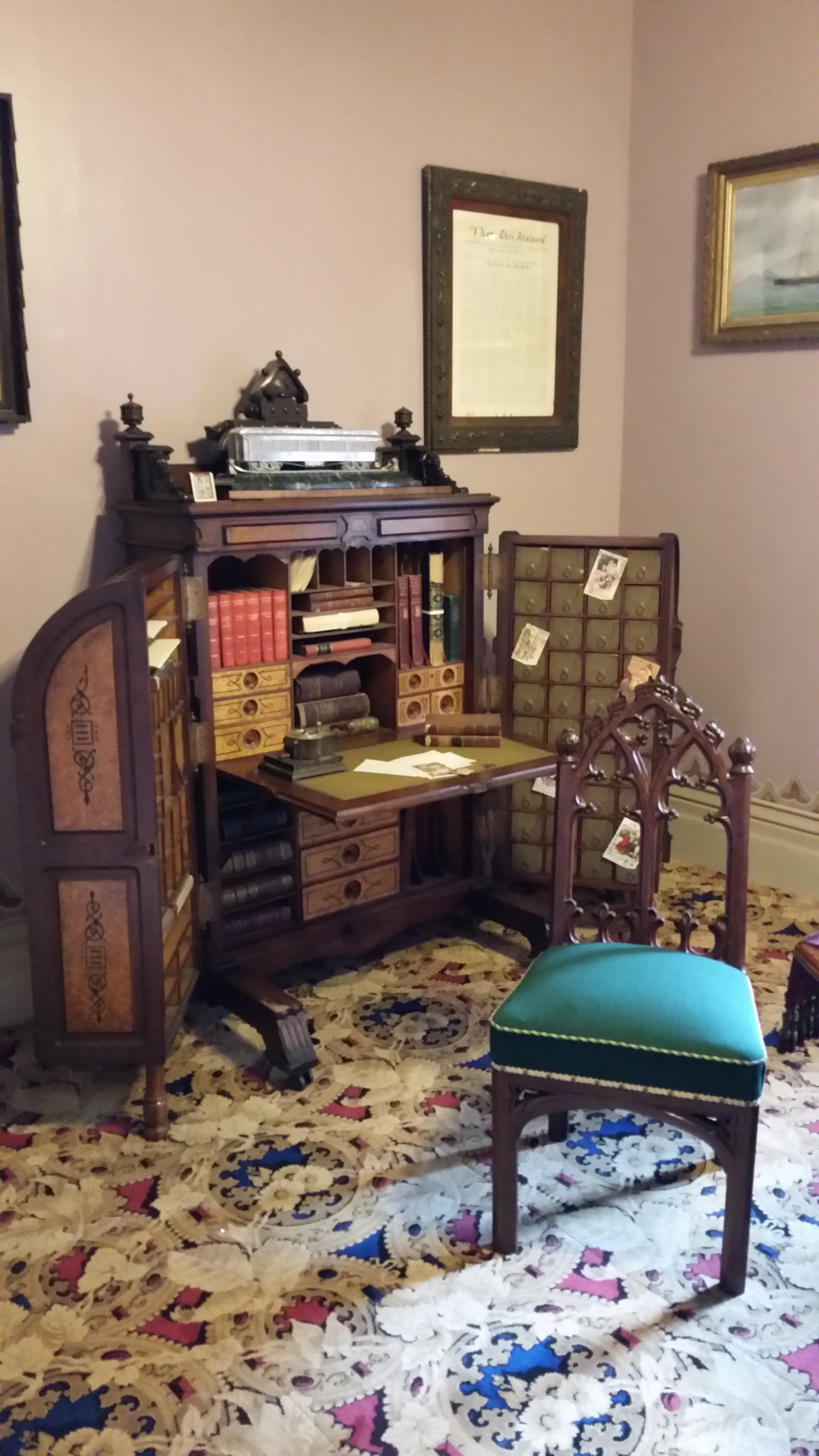
Gould's office

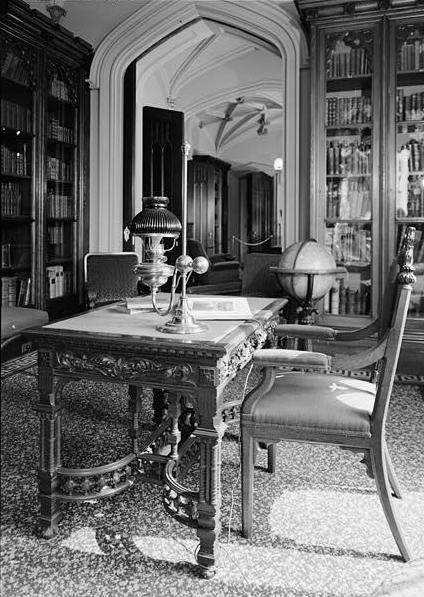
The north library

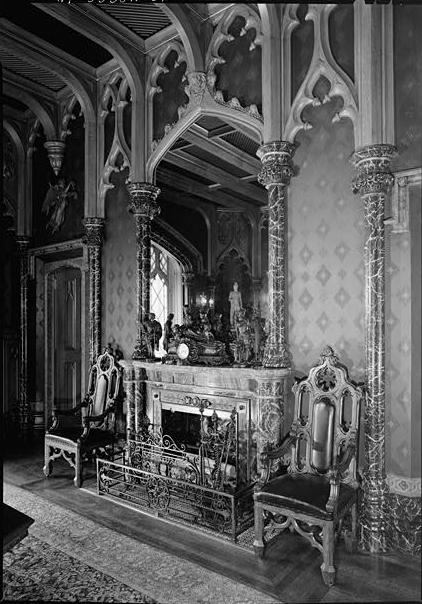
A dining room fireplace

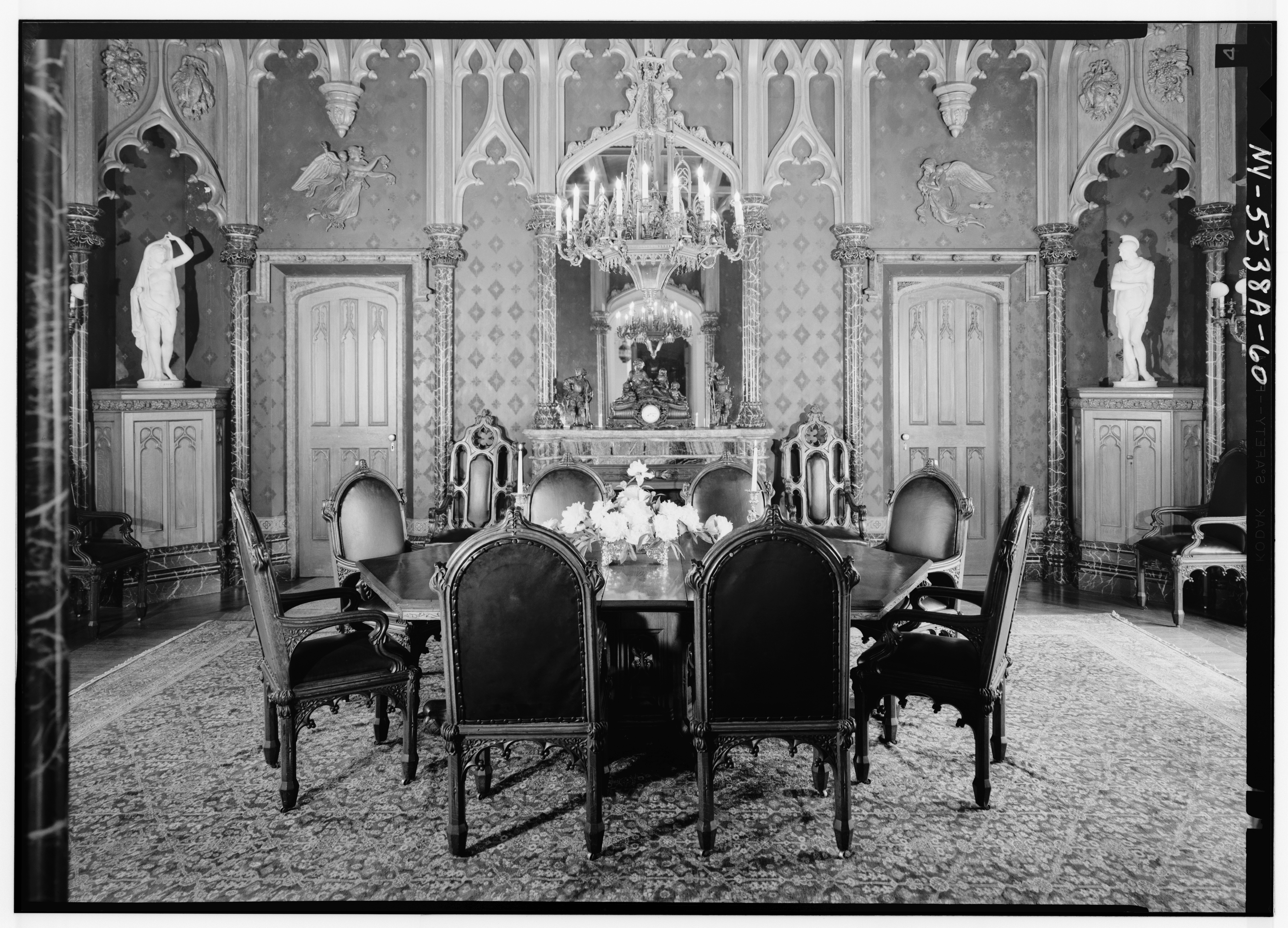
Dining room

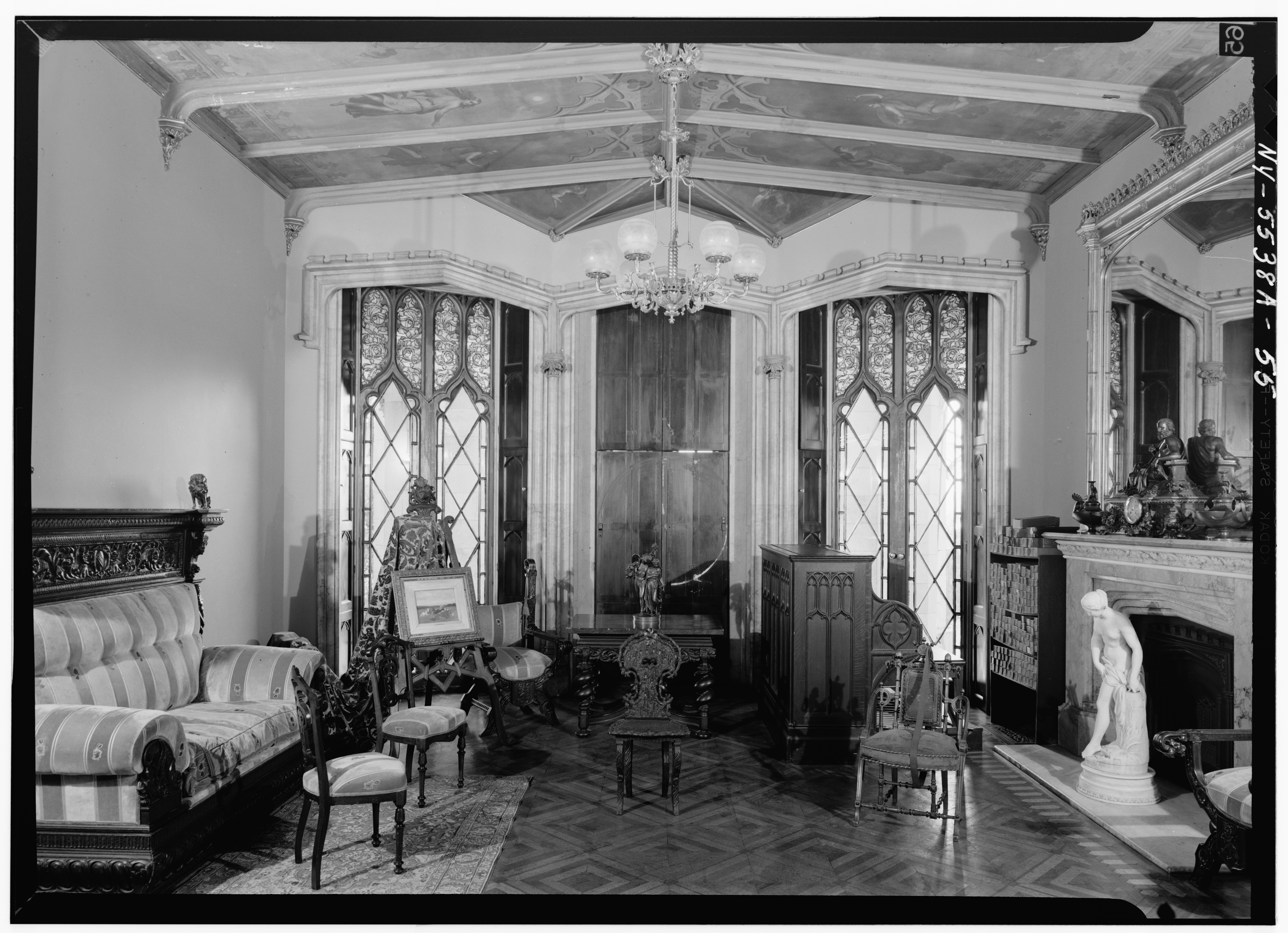
Music room

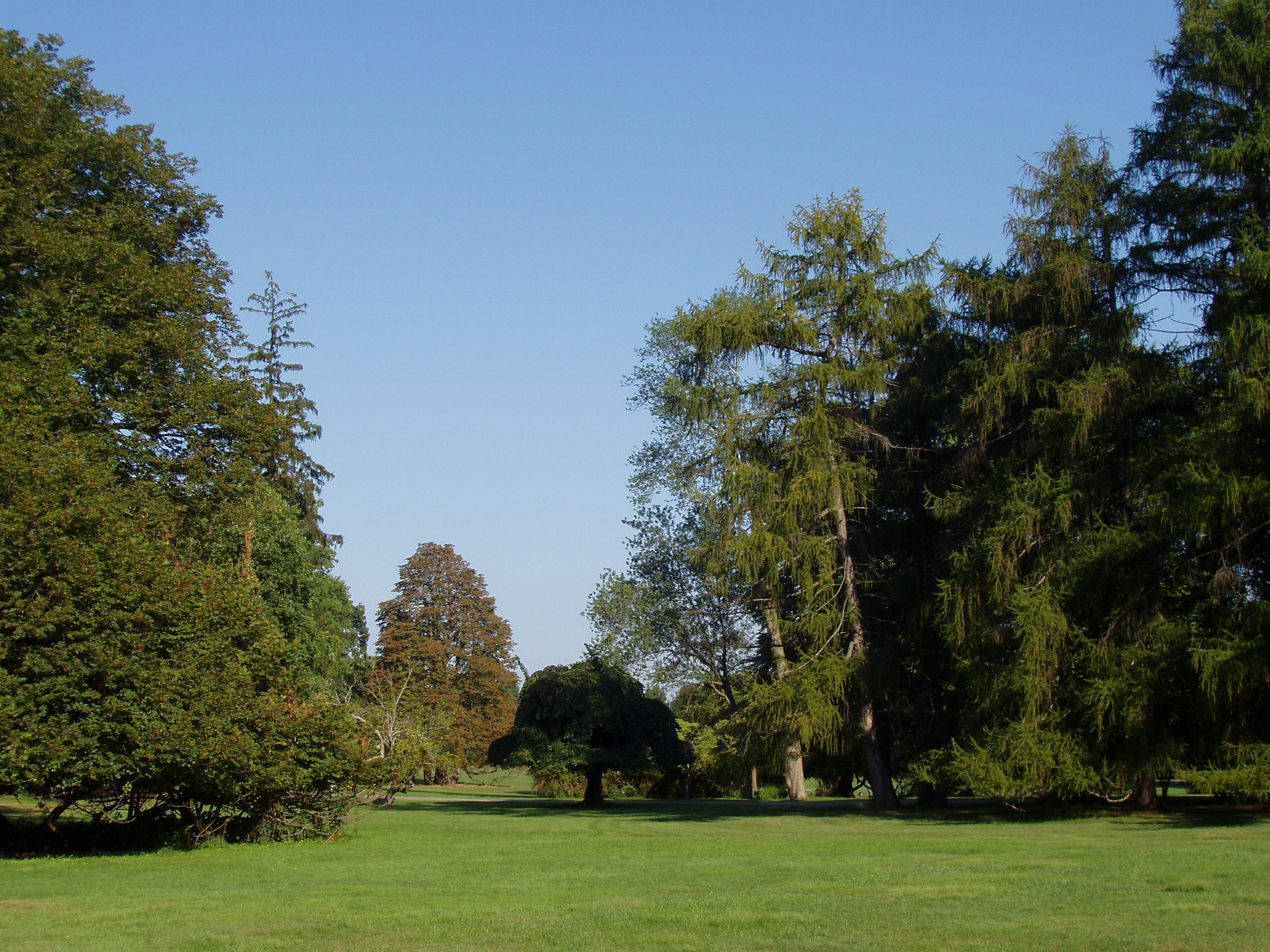
View from the front park

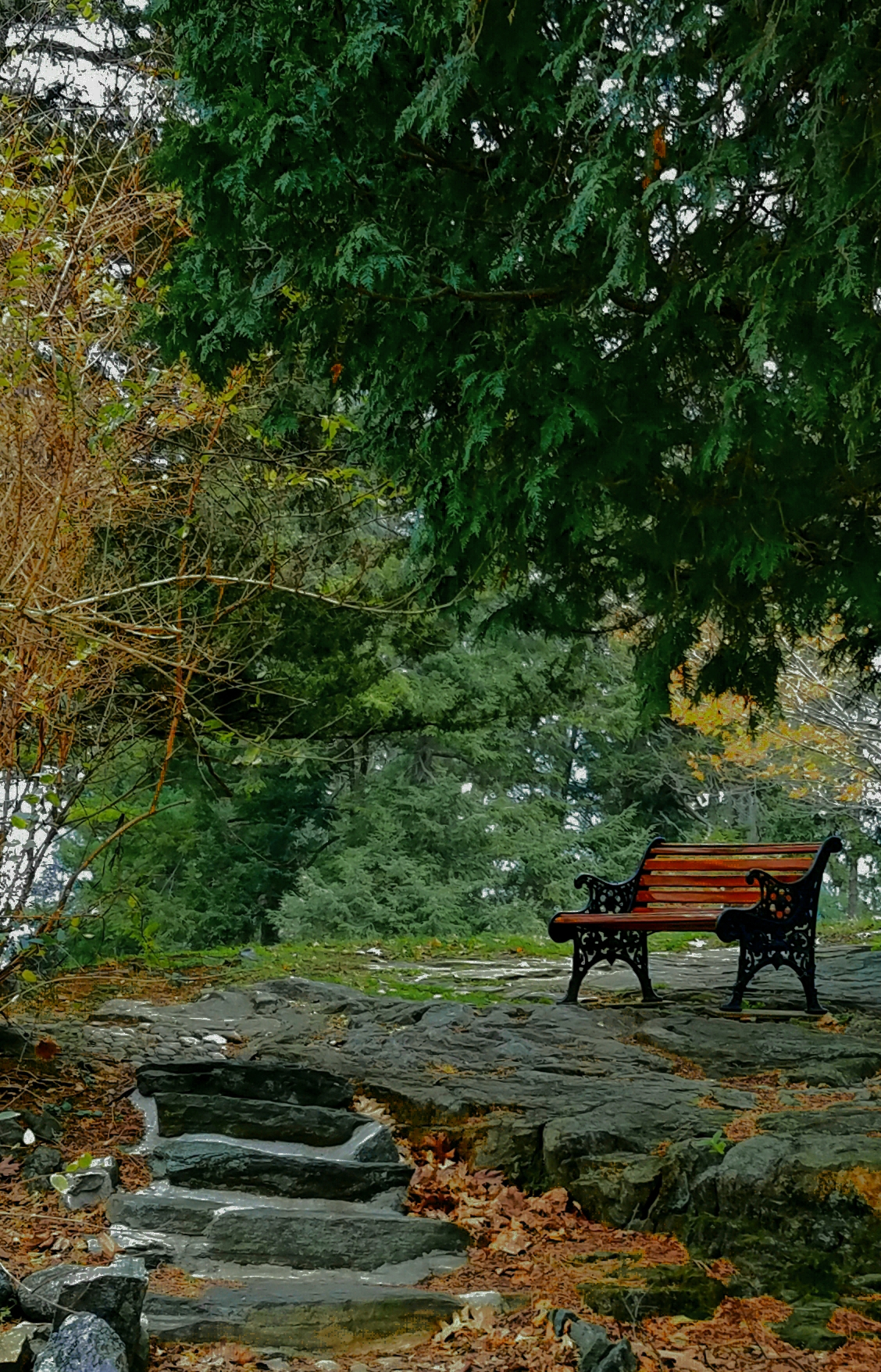
One of the benches on the grounds

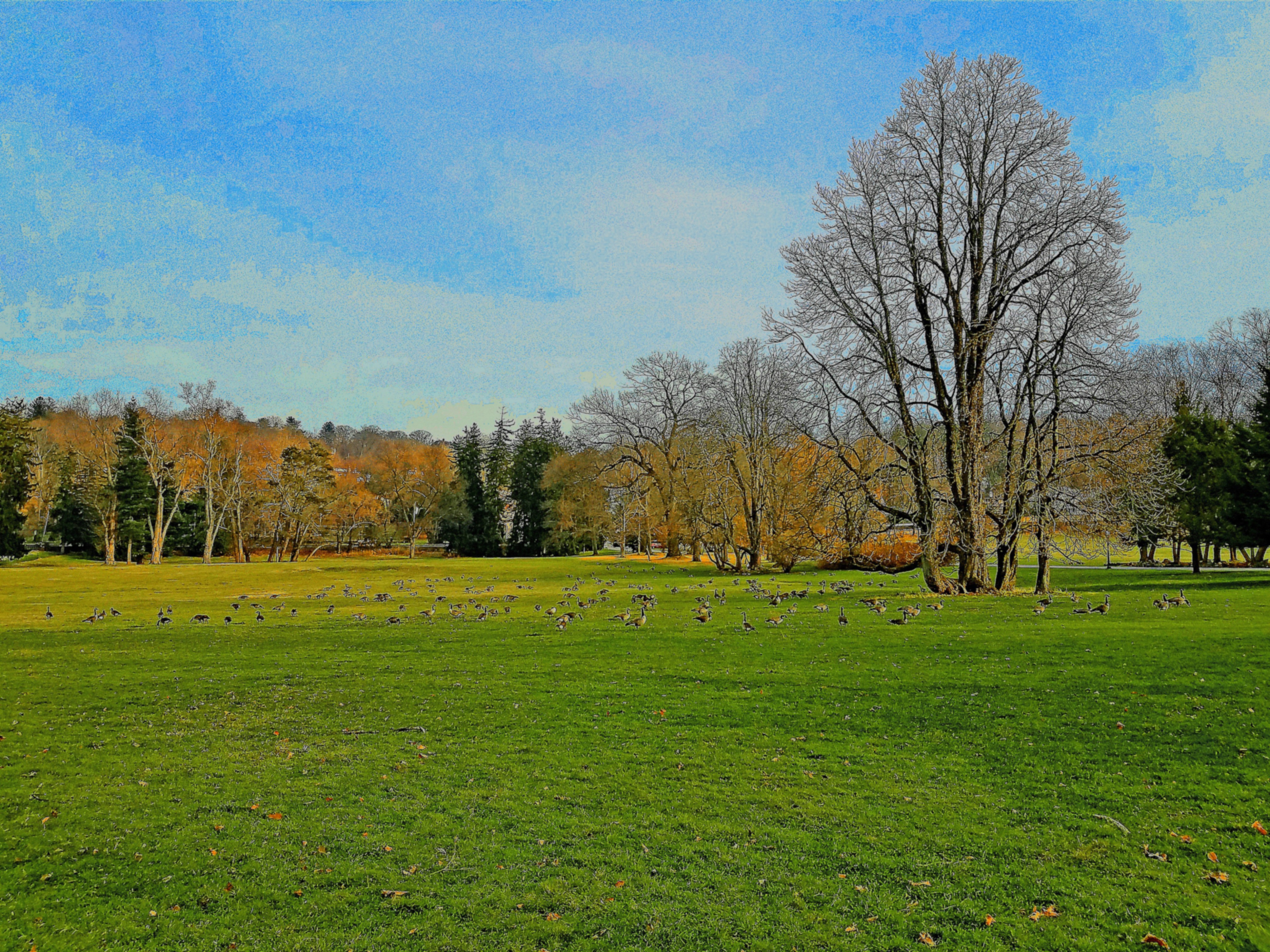
Southern section of the grounds

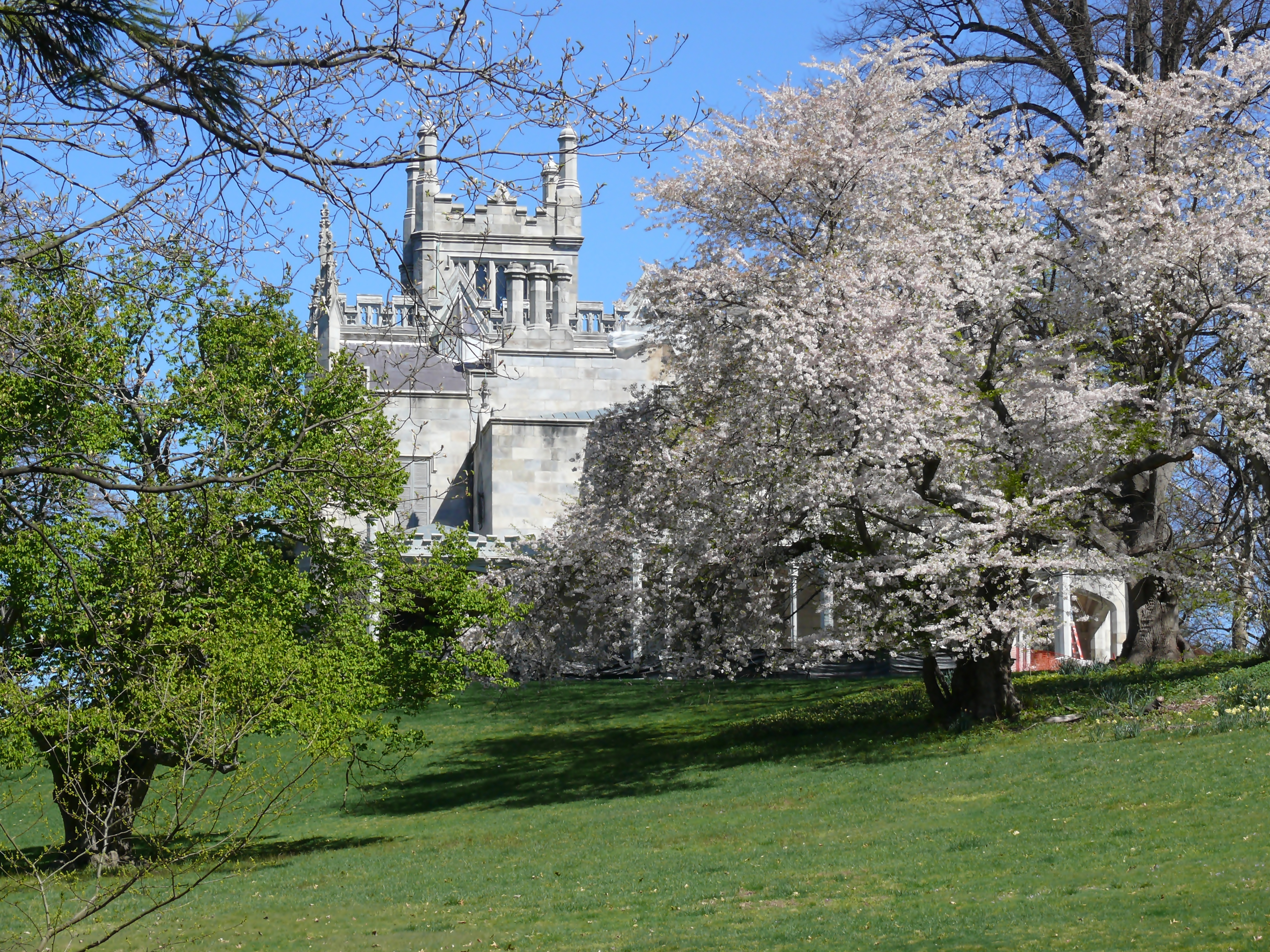
The estate in bloom

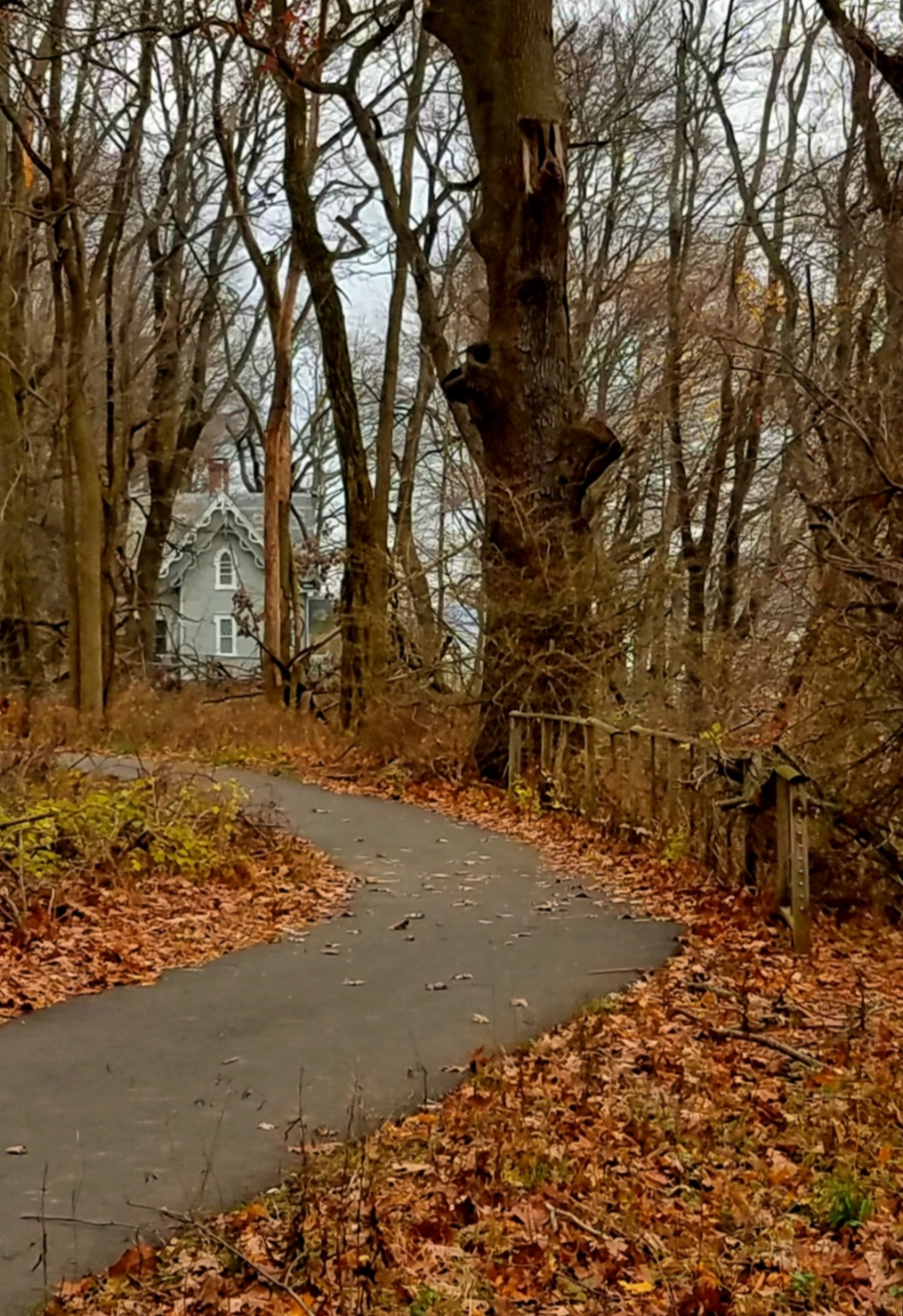
Lyndhurst section of Westchester RiverWalk

== See also ==
- List of National Historic Landmarks in New York
- National Register of Historic Places listings in northern Westchester County, New York
