= Louis M. Little =

United States Marine Corps general

Louis McCarty Little
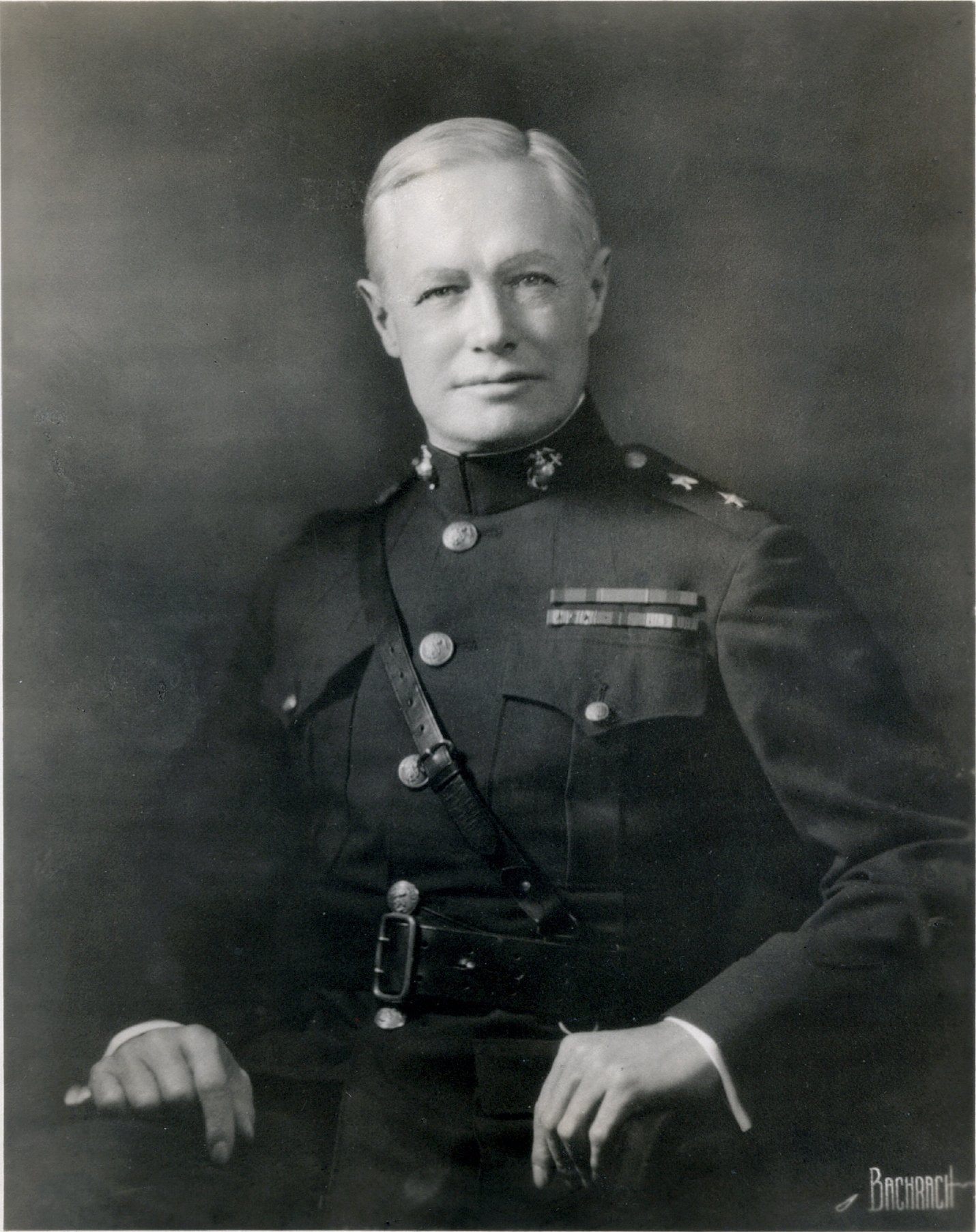
- Born: January 16, 1878; New York City, New York, U.S.
- Died: July 16, 1960 (aged 82); Newport, Rhode Island, U.S.
- Burial place: Arlington National Cemetery
- Military career
- Allegiance: United States of America
- Branch: United States Marine Corps
- Service years: 1899–1942
- Rank: Major general
- Commands: Assistant Commandant of the Marine Corps; Fleet Marine Force
- Conflicts: World War I World War II

Louis McCarty Little (January 16, 1878 – July 16, 1960) was the 11th assistant commandant of the Marine Corps. He was the son of Captain William McCarty Little, USN.

== Early years ==
Little was born January 16, 1878, in New York City, New York and after joining the Marine Corps participated in numerous conflicts including World War I, World War II and the Boxer Rebellion.

By the time he retired he had achieved the rank of major general. He died July 16, 1960, in Newport, Rhode Island, and is buried in Arlington National Cemetery.

== Awards and decorations ==
During his military career he was awarded: China Campaign Medal (1900), Philippine Campaign Medal (1901–03), Marine Corps Expeditionary Medal with four bronze stars (Panama, 1903 and 1909; China, 1913–14; Haiti, 1920–21; China, 1924–27), World War I Victory Medal with Overseas Clasp, Haitian Campaign Medal (1919–20), American Defense Service Medal, World War II Victory Medal, Haitian Medal of Honor and Merit in the rank of "Grand Officer" with Diploma, and Haitian Medaille Milataire (1920).
