= Jacob Little =

American investor

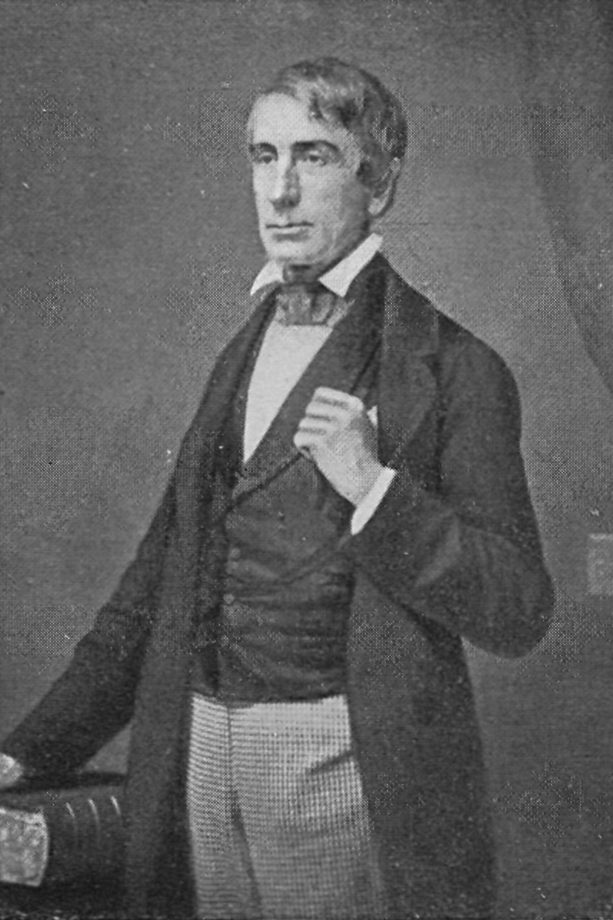
- "He was a tall slight man, with a stoop, quick in his movements...his mobility of expression was so extreme that the very shape of his features actually changed with his emotions."
- Born: March 17, 1794; Newburyport, Massachusetts
- Died: March 28, 1865 (aged 71); New York, New York
- Occupations: Investor, stock speculator
- Years active: 1835–1857
- Board member of: New York Stock Exchange

Jacob Little (March 17, 1794 – March 28, 1865) was an early 19th-century Wall Street investor and the first and one of the greatest speculators in the history of the stock market, known at the time as the "Great Bear of Wall Street". Little was born in Newburyport, Massachusetts, and moved to New York City in 1817, first clerking for Jacob Barker; he then opened his own establishment in 1822, and finally his own brokerage in 1834. A market pessimist, Little made his wealth "bearing stocks", at turns short selling various companies and at others cornering markets to extract profits from other short sellers. Through his great financial foresight Little amassed an enormous fortune, becoming one of the richest men in America and one of the leading financiers on Wall Street in the 1830s and 1840s, but his speculative activities irritated his peers and earned him few admirers. Little lost and remade his legendary fortune multiple times before losing it for good in 1857; (Note: Although it is known that Little went bankrupt multiple times over his career, some historians say he did so thrice while others say nine times.) although a great many owed him enormous debts, he was a generous creditor and never collected them, and at his deathbed in 1865 Little was penniless. Although well-known on the stock market in his time, he was quickly forgotten after his death, and today has been relegated to relative obscurity.

== Early life and background ==
Although much is known of Little's investment activities in his adult life, little is known about his early years. Jacob Little was born in Newburyport, Massachusetts on March 17, 1794. The son of a successful local shipbuilder and of Quaker origin, Little exhibited a strong understanding of money and financial markets from an early age. In 1817 he emigrated to New York City and became a clerk in the store of Jacob Barker, a highly successful financier, merchant, and politically well-connected founding member of the Democratic Party political machine Tammany Hall. Little spent five years in apprenticeship under Barker before moving out in 1822 to start his own business with $700 he had accrued over the length of his employment. He bought a small office in the basement of a Wall Street building, which served as his base of operations for the next twelve years, before moving out of his old office to a new one in the basement of the old exchange building in 1834, from which he opened a brokerage—the start of his investment career.

== Market operations ==
Little entered the stock market at a time when banking and stock-brokerage was coming in of its own, progressing to a profit-motivated business in its own right. However, a large part of this growth came not from "solid" investors—those interested in the business ventures they funded—but from speculative "wheeler-dealers" who would manipulate prices to profiteer from their holdings or, just as often, from those of others. By the eve of the American Civil War there were hundreds of such speculative brokerage firms on Wall Street; warring cliques of bulls and bears would routinely drive prices artificially high and low, respectively, often in underhand ways that angered more legitimate stockbrokers.

Little was one of the earliest and most successful practitioners of Short Selling, making a fortune by leveraging both drops in market value and short sellers. In the former, he would sell stocks to other traders under contract to purchase it at a later date, betting that the market value would go down in the future and he could pocket the difference (trade rules have changed, and short selling is more complicated than this today). In the latter he would execute the opposite maneuver, corner a market by buying up all of the bonds of a particular company or sector, up-ticking the price so as to make a profit at the expense of any short sales based on those stocks. Hardworking, highly ambitious, and with his eyes set on the very top from the very beginning, Little commonly spent twelve hours a day working on such maneuvers in his office and a further six during the evening engaged in currency speculation.

His first great coup was when in 1834 he successfully bought out the Morris Canal and Banking Company which pushed its stock price from $10 ($323 today) per share in December 1834 to $185 ($5,966 today) a share in January 1835. Although theoretically he could have asked for more (he was, after all, in total control of the company), Little chose not to force the issue because he feared the resulting bankruptcies would destabilize the market potentially cause a collapse. He repeated this feat in September of the same year, cornering stocks for the construction of the Harlem Railroad. Approximately 60,000 shares had been sold short by that time, but only 7,000 shares had yet been issued; needless to say, Little prospered immensely.

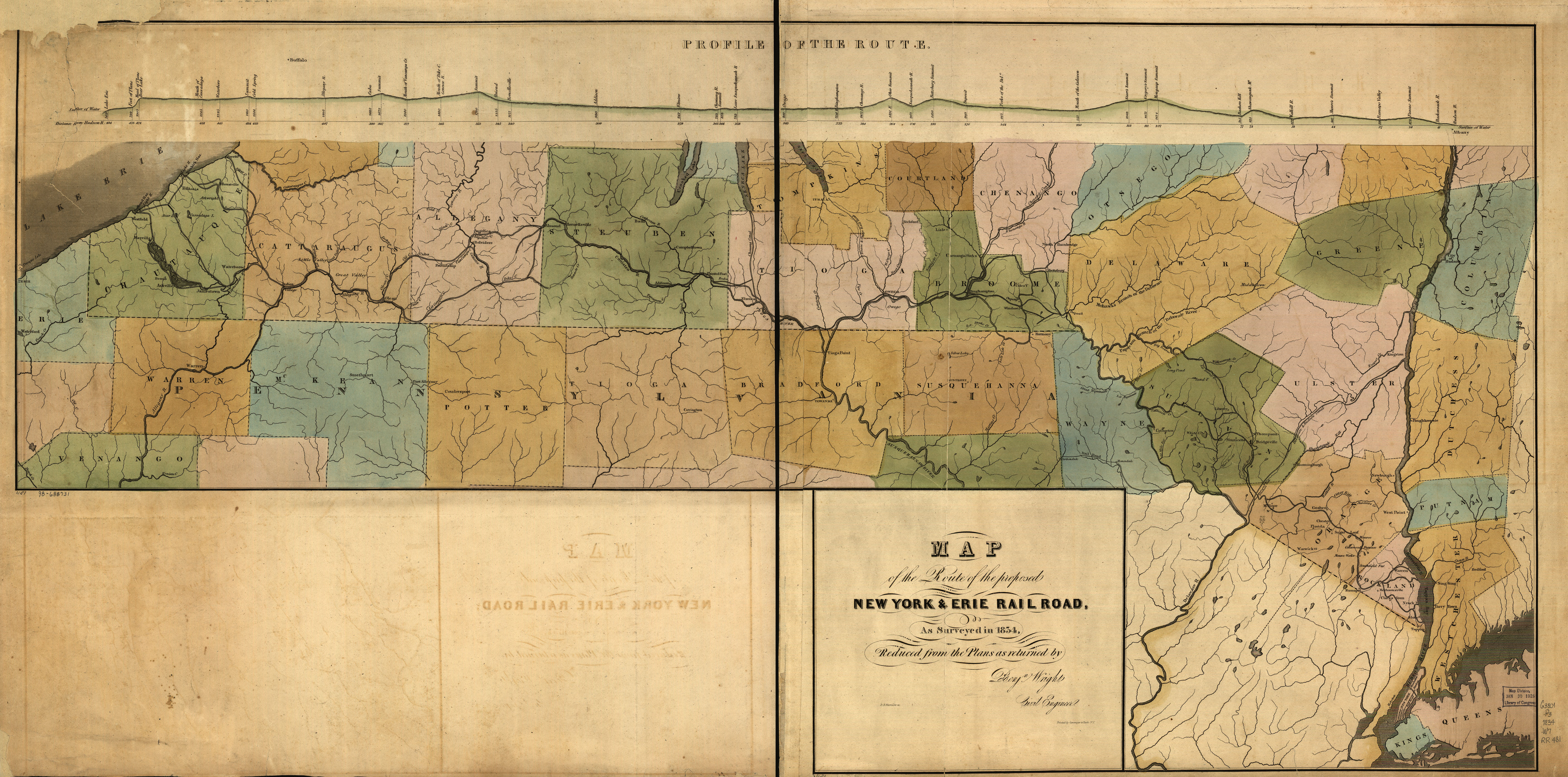
The Erie Railroad system circa 1834, a favorite speculative target of Little's

By this time Little was already one of the richest men in America, accruing millions of dollars in security holdings through short sales, a market volume that made him the "Napoleon of the Board." He was noted for being personally retired in manner, diffident except to business, in correspondence with most of the major economic voices of the nation, and a devout member of the Episcopal Church. As a trader, he was unscrupulous and serendipitous; in one instance he promised a group of Bostonian traders that he would not sell his holdings in the Norwich and Worcester Railroad below the price of 90 dollars a share, but promptly did so soon after when noticed its price slipping, earning him much condemnation and lasting outrage from other traders. But he was also known for his practiced judgement, the promptness of his dealings, and his great financial foresight; Little was able to predict Andrew Jackson's campaign against the Bank of the United States and the resultant Panic of 1837, and was able to protect his interests during the financial debacle by short selling his own holdings, a lucrative operation that earned him his most lasting title: "The Great Bear of Wall Street." Little himself often stated he was in the business of "bearing stock", in the tradition of the bear market.

Little distinguished himself with large, early investments into the railroad construction industry, still regarded with some suspicion by financiers. His 1845 investment of $100,000 towards the Providence and Worcester Railroad was crucial to that company beginning construction. As with his other activities, these paid off handily, eventually earning him a new title, that of the "Railroad King". However, for all of his wealth Little was little loved by his peers, many of whom secretly believed him to be lacking personal integrity, a hulking, manipulative figure who built his fortune through speculation and market manipulation and crushed other traders underfoot as he did. Little "had been known to gorge and digest more stock in one day than the weight of bulk of his whole body in certificates." Other investors followed his actions closely, terming him "too shrewd to be caught, too rich to be ruined", and his sway and influence in the market was indeed enormous.

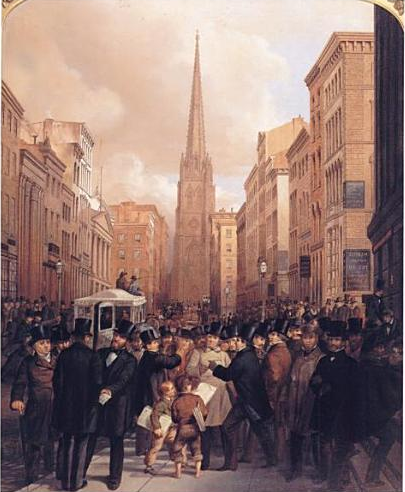
Wall Street, Half Past Two O'clock, October 13, 1857, depicting Wall Street investors reeling from news of the Panic of 1857. Standing in a gray coat in the center of the painting, Little is particularly stunned by the news. It would lead to his downfall.

However, this aura of untouchability nearly came to an end when the cornermaster was himself cornered. (Note: Sources differ over what year this happened, ranging from 1837 or 1838 through 1855.) Little particularly favored shorting the stocks of the Erie Railroad Company, and it was here that he was trapped by the cornering of the company's stock by a hostile syndicate of rival stockbrokers calling itself the "Happy Family" (in much the same way as he had done to countless other traders before). This led to a rather dramatic showdown between Little and the financiers involved. At the time, making good on a purchase promise required a transaction at the associated clerk's office, and on the day it was due the brokers gathered at the Erie Railroad Company clerk's office, smug at the likelihood that they had beaten Little at his own game. What the traders did not know was that Little had purchased convertible bonds at a company sale in London a few years before; Little entered the premises, apparently unrushed, carrying an oversize bag of what was revealed to be those very bonds, which Little had converted to stocks. To the astonishment of all, Little not only outplayed the syndicate but came out hundreds of thousands of dollars ahead; such a maneuver was never attempted again.

This action (and others like it) was intensely unpopular with the other investors, however, and he was blackballed from entry in the New York Stock Exchange several times before regaining admittance. Following the event, a rule was made to limit the length of any option contracts to sixty days, to prevent a similar coup on the short side. After some troubles, Little was again worth $2 million by 1846 (equivalent to about $71.7 million today). However, his fortunes were again reversed that year when he attempted but failed to corner the Norwich and Worcester Railroad and was obligated to pay out for thousands of inflated shares that he had himself bid up in price, losing about a million dollars in the process—a staggering sum at the time.

Reversals of fortune were common in the stock market, and Little was no exception, going bankrupt three or nine times over the course of his career. After one such fall, walking with a friend along Union Square, site of some of the most prestigious and expensive housing in the city and in the world, he remarked that "I have lost money enough today to buy this whole square. Yes, and half the people in it." It was in these instances that Little most surely showed his strength of character; after each of his falls from fortune Little was able to rebuild his commercial empire, and even pay back his old contracts in full, leading some to remark that "Jacob Little's suspended papers were better than the checks of most men."

Nonetheless at length Little's predictive faculties finally failed him. The Panic of 1857 completely blindsided the investor, who at the time was "long", possessing huge amounts of stock, much bought on the "margin" (on loan). Thus when the stock prices fell Little was forced into bankruptcy by margin calls, lenders demanding recompense for the fall in the value of the stocks. This time there was no bouncing back. Little had lost all but everything he held, and did not have the confidence of others on Wall Street needed to obtain their backing. Little's reign as Wall Street giant and one of the richest men in the country was over.

== Later life and legacy ==
A speculator to his very core, Little never put away any of his fortune to prepare for a rainy day; any money he made on the stock market, he immediately invested back into it. Thus when the Panic of 1857 destroyed his investment fortune, Little was left penniless. He would live out the rest of his life under the wing of his last protége, David Groesbeck. Little was only ever able to make small trading returns to the market in his later years, and the magnitude of his fall was often the target of mockery from his former peers. He died a broken man. Little died on March 28, 1865, and his funeral was held on March 31 at New York's Grace Church. His pall-bearers included Jesse Hoyt and Edward Prime; Reverend Thomas House Taylor officiated at his funeral.

In his 1908 account on the early world of finance, Fifty Years in Wall Street, Henry Clews (who knew Little personally) penned that Little was "generous and liberal to a fault with his brother speculators who had experienced misfortune...remarkable for his great memory, he could easily remember all the operations he made in the course of a day without making a note or a mistake," and another stock market historian, Leonard Louis Levinson, said that he was "a nervous perfectionist who personally attended to every detail...kind, magnanimous, honorable, and a genius in market maneuvers." Having fallen into bankruptcy many times before, Little was a particularly sensitive debtor, and would often waive the debts held to him by others who fell on hard times; thus it came to be that, by the time of his death, Little was owed millions of dollars by others, of which only 150,000 was successfully collected by his friends and family, a modest sum given the size of his former wealth.

However, the opinion of him held by most investors of the day was not quite so rosy. A reflection on the Erie Railroad Company coup published by The New York Times in 1882 all but accused him of being a robber baron:

"He drove Wall-street before him just as in his earlier days he would have lashed a recalcitrant ox into obedience. No method was too severe for Jacob Little. If a man stood in the way, that man got hurt. Naturally, the whole Street was dead set against him. Innumerable schemes were laid for his discomfiture, simply to end in miscarriage. Combinations were formed, to be speedily dissolved under the crack of the Little whip."

Little was not the first to gain and lose his fortune in the stock market, but he was a pioneering speculator, the first to rely on his ability to predict market fluctuations to inform his speculations instead of bidding with what would today be considered insider information. He was the first Great Bear; before his rapid rise speculation and market manipulation was virtually unknown in the stock market, as no one before him had had the still nerve and financial foresight necessary to profit from such risky endeavors, and many market historians consider him the first modern stock market tycoon. His ability to gain and lose fortunes on a day-by-day basis was a microcosm of the meteoric possibilities and insecurities of speculation, and after his death and even during his life many other investors tried to imitate his success, with little success. His victory over the Erie Railroad scheme (and market cornering activities in general) inspired similar plots in the years thereafter; in 1863 the industrialist Cornelius Vanderbilt successfully cornered the Harlem Railroad in much the same way that Little had done almost thirty years earlier, and fell into a corner trap formed by Daniel Drew and others himself in the later Erie War. This did much to give credence to convertible bonds, then still a novelty.

Nonetheless for all of his wealth and innovation Little's ignominious end ensured he was quickly forgotten, and by the time Edwin Lefèvre published his now-classic Reminiscences of a Stock Operator in 1923 he was virtually unknown. To demonstrate this Lefèvre details asking nine seasoned members of the NYSE whether or not they had ever heard of Jacob Little before; only three of them did, and none could name who he was or what he had done, only knowing of his existence from having heard his name before. Lefèvre provided for this fact by saying "what happened to Jacob was no more than what happens to thousands every year. The difference in degree does not make it more memorable." Though it had once been that "on [the stock ex]change his tread was that of a king", today Little has been relegated to obscurity, and survives only as a footnote in histories of the stock market.
