= William McCarty Little =

19th century American naval officer

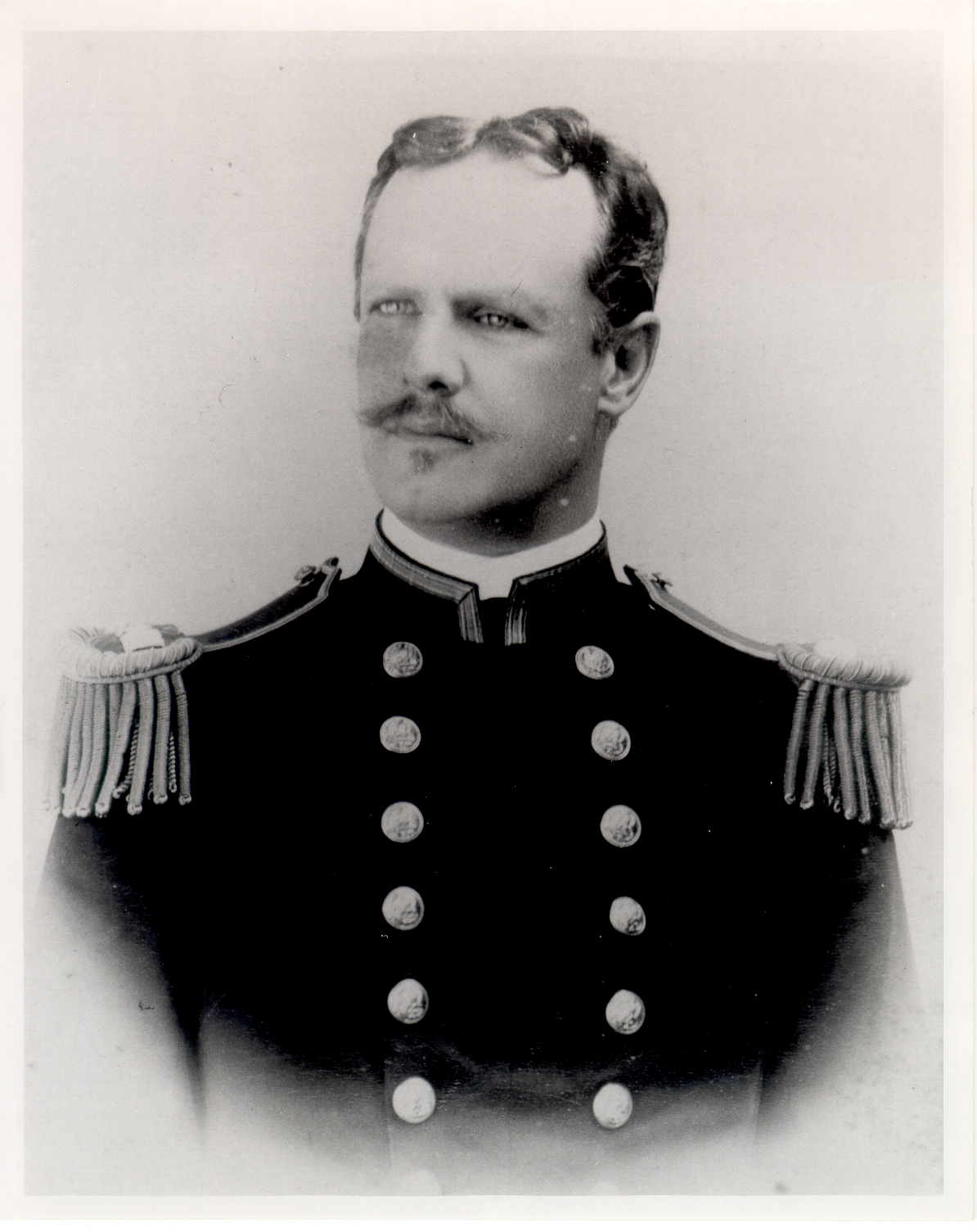
- Born: 6 September 1845; New York City, United States
- Died: 12 March 1915 (aged 69) Newport, RI, United States
- Branch: US Navy
- Service years: 1866-1915
- Rank: Lieutenant

William McCarty Little (6 September 1845 – 12 March 1915) was a United States Navy officer of the late 19th century. He is most noted for his contributions to the development of naval wargaming at the United States Naval War College in Newport, Rhode Island.

== Biography ==
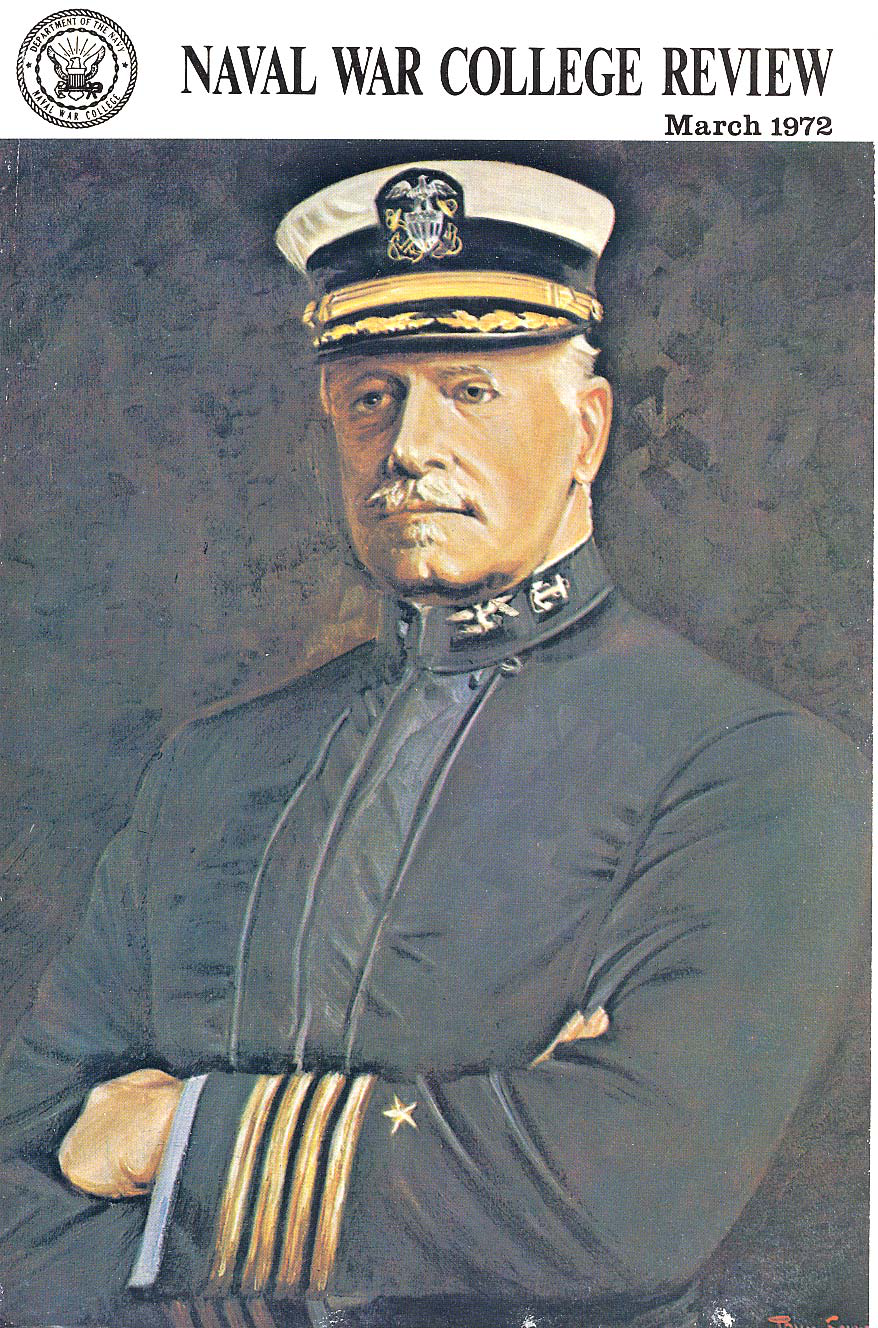
Little, on the cover of Naval War College Review (March 1972)

William McCarty Little (often referred to as "McCarty Little") was born in New York City on 6 September 1845 and entered the United States Naval Academy on 11 March 1863. For the duration of the American Civil War the Naval Academy had been relocated to Newport, Rhode Island, where Little and his wealthy parents had become accustomed to spending their summers. While at the academy, he met Lieutenant (later Rear Admiral) Stephen B. Luce who was to have a great influence in Little's life. Luce regarded Newport's Narragansett Bay as uniquely suitable for naval training, and with Little campaigned to have the Naval Academy remain there after the civil war.

Little was, apparently, a very bright student as he was allowed to graduate from the Academy in June 1866 after only three of the usual four years of study. After graduation, he served on the USS Macedonian, USS Saco and the famous sail racing yacht America—which was being used as a training ship by the Academy.

He was granted three months leave in Europe and, in 1867, reported for duty on the USS Colorado, the flagship of the European Squadron.

Little was commissioned as an ensign on 12 March 1868 and was assigned as a flag lieutenant (aide) to Commodore Pennock, the commander of the European Squadron. He was promoted to the rank of master on 26 March 1869 and assigned to the USS Franklin. He was then promoted to lieutenant on 29 March 1870.

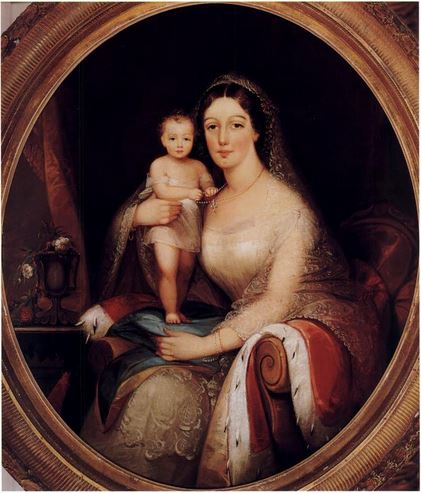
Anita Chartrand Little by Jane Stuart

In 1871 Little was detached from the Franklin to begin an eight-month study leave in Europe. It was probably during this time he became acquainted with the German Kriegspiel (war game) which was used to train officers of the German Army in tactics. In 1872 he returned to the United States to become an instructor at the Naval Torpedo Station in Newport, where he married Anita Chartrand, who was the daughter of a socially prominent Cuban family and a belle of Newport's summer colony. In 1878 Little was assigned as navigator on the training ship USS Minnesota under Captain Stephen B. Luce. In 1881 Luce was promoted to commodore and Little was assigned as executive officer of Luce's flagship, the venerable ship-of-the-line USS New Hampshire.

Little had lost the sight in one eye in a shooting accident ashore in 1876, and strained his remaining eye preparing nautical charts in insufficient light while serving as navigation officer aboard USS Adams. There was danger of complete blindness, and he was involuntarily retired from the Navy on 16 May 1884 for "incapacity as a result of an incident in the service".

Despite being retired, he volunteered to serve on the staff of the newly established United States Naval War College of which Stephen B. Luce was the first president. Little had helped Luce establish the College at Newport, and worked with Luce's replacement, Alfred Thayer Mahan, to keep the College operational. Mahan mentioned Little in his memoir, From Sail to Steam, in describing the early days of the Naval War College when Mahan was preparing the series of lectures that became The Influence of Sea Power Upon History. In particular, Mahan noted that Little had drafted several of the maps for the book, an early instance of Little's commitment to visualizing strategic problems.

Under Mahan's direction, Little introduced naval war gaming at the college in a lecture he gave in 1886. The war games, typically using models of ships on a flat surface representing the ocean, were a useful tool for preparing officers attending the college to command squadrons and fleets of ships later in their careers. They were also useful in developing tactics which could be useful in future conflicts. Little is credited with adapting the naval version of Army war games being used by his friend, Major W.R. Livermore, who was stationed at Fort Adams near the War College. The War College and Fort Adams conducted joint training maneuvers in 1887 with Fort Adams defending against a simulated night torpedo attack on harbor shipping in October, and a simulated amphibious invasion of Newport in November.

Little persuaded Mahan to publish his classic The Influence of Sea Power upon History in 1890. He then translated French, Italian, Spanish, and German publications for the War College library while the College was temporarily closed for construction of improved buildings from 1890 until 1892.

In 1891, Little was assigned to the US diplomatic mission to Spain regarding the commemoration of Christopher Columbus at the 1893 Chicago World's Fair. He worked closely with the special envoy, William Eleroy Curtis.

Little was appointed as the commander of the Rhode Island Naval Militia in 1896 and returned to active duty during the Spanish–American War. During the war he served as the executive officer of the Naval Training Station in Newport. After the war he resumed his duties at the Naval War College.

In recognition of his valuable contributions, by a special act of Congress, Little was promoted to the rank of captain on the retired list on 21 February 1903 and made a permanent faculty member at the Naval War College.

In 1912 his lecture "The Strategic Naval War Game Or Chart Maneuver" was published by the United States Naval Institute. This article in Proceedings emphasized the importance for officers to train their intuitive judgment through visualization of strategic problems through charts, game boards, and small models.

Captain Little was a member of the Naval Order of the United States.

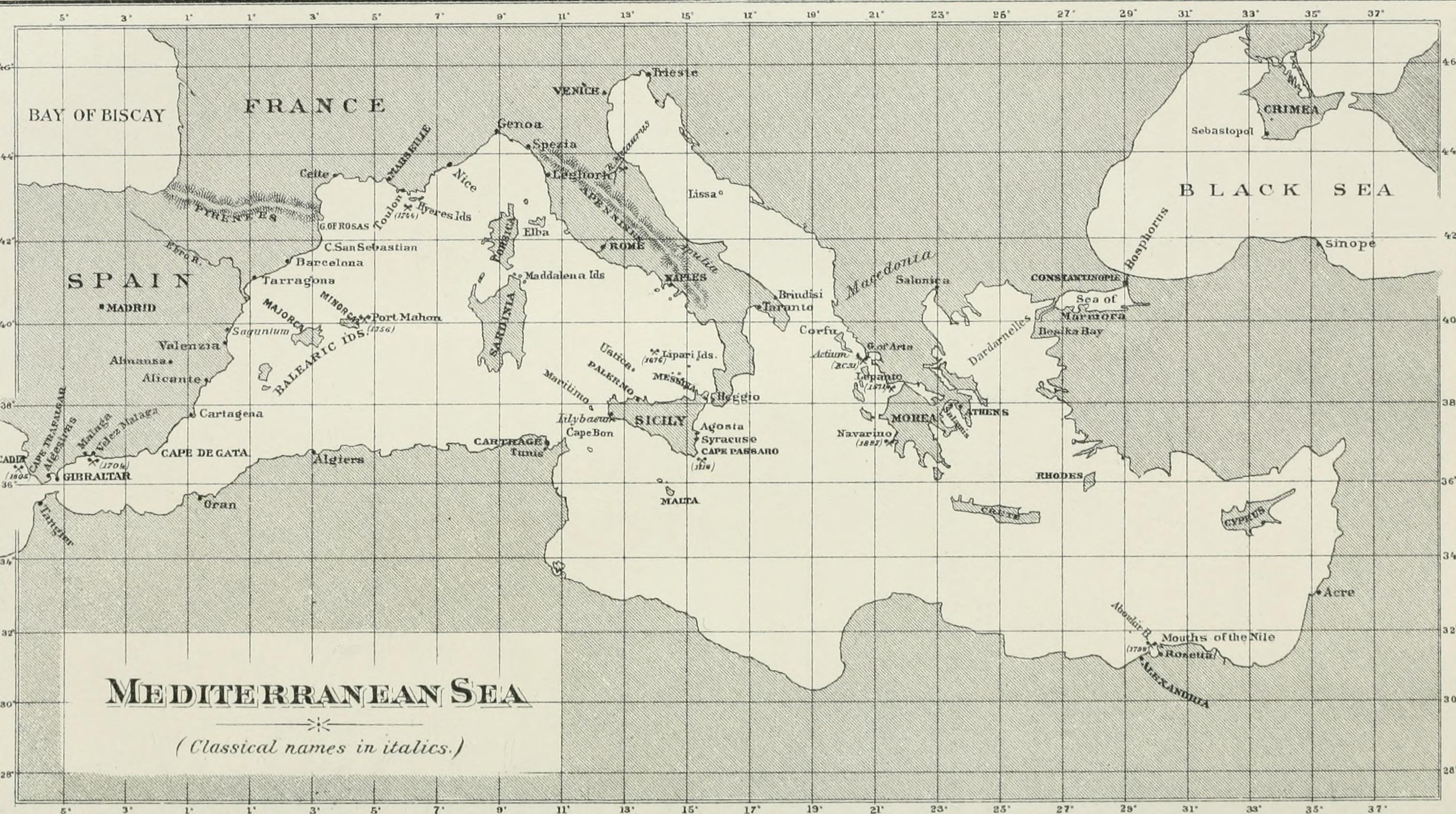
Map of the Mediterranean Sea published in the 1890 edition of Mahan's The Influence of Sea Power Upon History. Mahan praised McCarty Little in his memoirs for assisting him with drafting maps in this period.

Captain Little retired from the Naval War College in January 1915 and died at his home in Newport on 12 March 1915. He was buried at St. Mary's Episcopal Cemetery in Portsmouth, Rhode Island. Admiral Luce died two years later; and was interred in an adjacent grave. Mahan had died a year before, after publicly recognizing McCarty Little's essential role in maintaining the Naval War College's continuity of purpose through the difficult early years. Admiral William Sims said: "...so long as we have a Naval War College, his name must always remain intimately associated with its best traditions."

== Family ==
Little was the father of Major General Louis McCarty Little, USMC who was the assistant commandant of the Marine Corps. General Little served in the Philippine Insurrection, World War I and World War II.

== Legacy ==
McCarty Little Hall at the Naval War College is named in honor of Captain William McCarty Little. It is the college's war gaming center.

In reference to value of naval war gaming at the Naval War College Fleet Admiral Chester W. Nimitz said that as a result of the war gaming nothing happened during the war in the Pacific, after the attack on Pearl Harbor, which was a surprise.
