= Jazz à Juan =

Annual jazz festival in Juan-les-Pins, France

Coordinates: 43°33′57″N 7°06′54″E

Jazz à Juan (French pronunciation: [dʒaz a ʒɥɑ̃]) is an annual jazz festival in Juan-les-Pins, Antibes, France. Beginning in 1960, it is one of the oldest jazz festivals in Europe.

== History ==
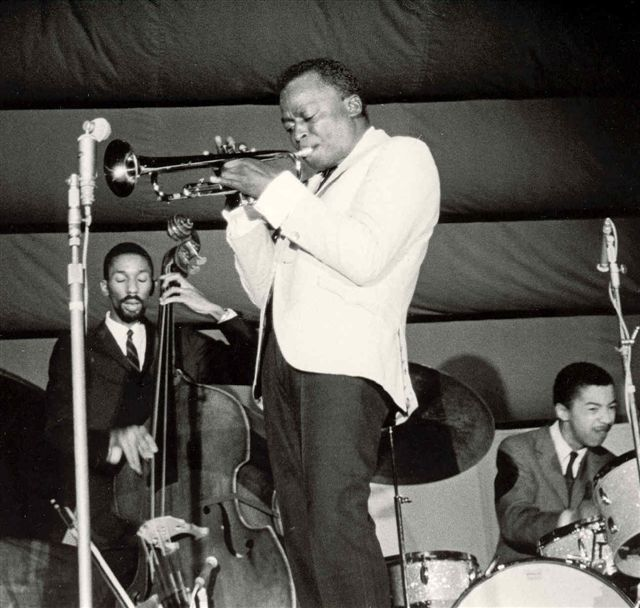
Miles Davis at Antibes 1963

Jazz à Juan began in 1960 as the "Festival Européen de Jazz". The first festival included musicians from Austria, Belgium, Czechoslovakia, England, France, Germany, Hungary, Italy, Netherlands, Norway, Poland, Switzerland, and Yugoslavia. The festival also included a tournament to find the best jazz musicians in Europe who would form a band. Performances from the first festival were recorded by the RTF (now France Inter), and live broadcasts were scheduled each evening. Later festivals were broadcast on radio and television.

During the 1960s, each year the festival would include headline acts from the USA, such as Charlie Mingus in 1960, Ray Charles and Count Basie in 1961, Fats Domino and Dizzy Gillespie in 1962, and Sarah Vaughan and Miles Davis in 1963. In 1966 Ella Fitzgerald and Duke Ellington performed together on stage.

The nearby Hôtel Provençal was associated with the festival's 1960s cultural scene; jazz singer Lilian Terry recalled being photographed there during the 1966 festival in Duke Ellington's suite with Ellington, Billy Strayhorn and Stevie James.

The festival relocated to Nice in 1971. Nice was chosen because they had previously hosted a jazz festival in 1947, and the festival remained in Nice for two years, before it returned to Antibes again. In 1974, the Nice Jazz Festival officially began and both festivals have continued separately since.

The festival later changed its name to Jazz à Juan, though it was more commonly referred to as The Antibes Festival or The Antibes Jazz Festival in press.

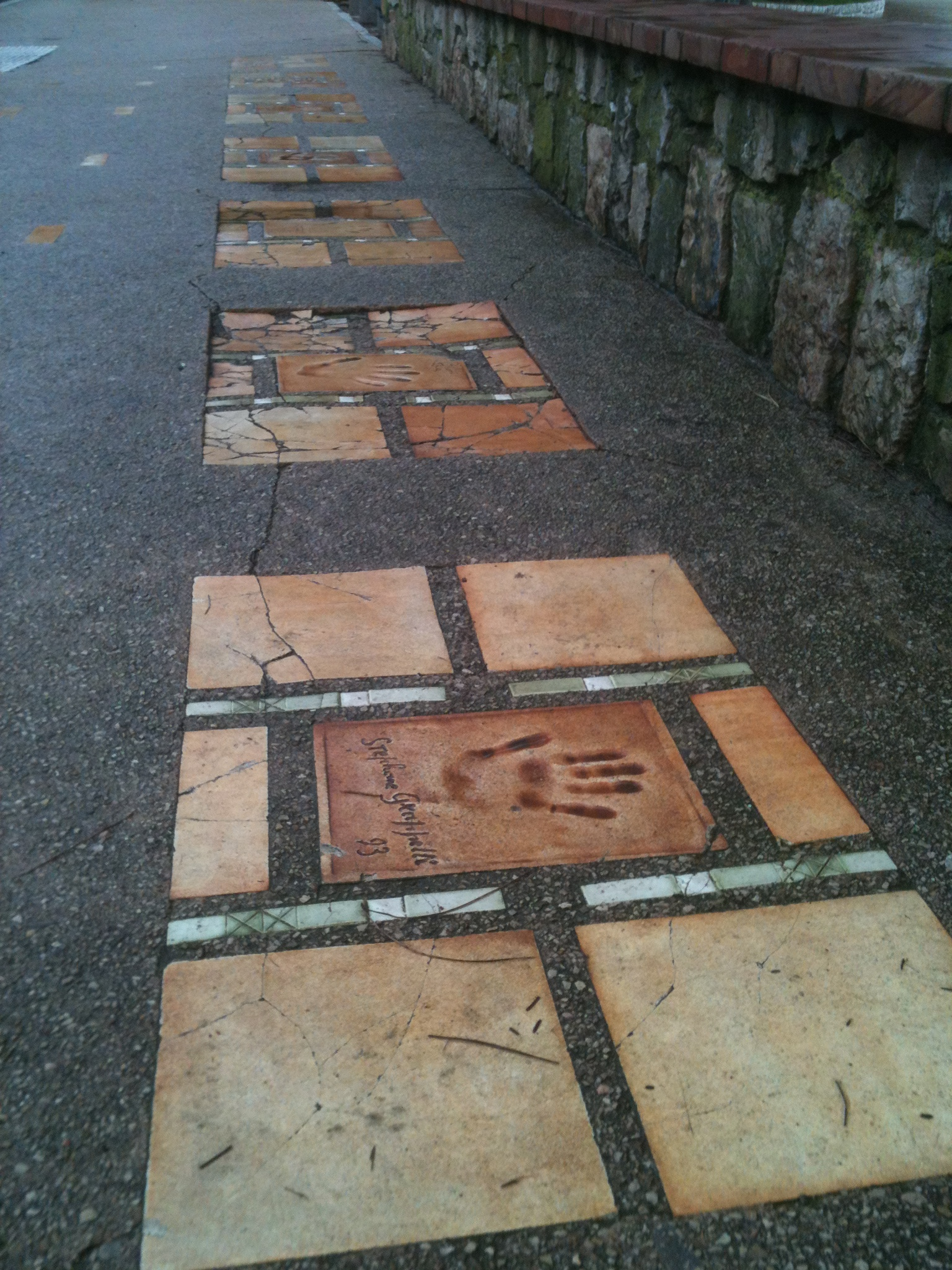
Hand impressions for performers at Jazz à Juan festival on Boulevard Edouard Baudoin, Juan les Pins

Along the Boulevard Edouard Baudoin, which runs behind the seaside stage that hosts the annual jazz festival, ceramic tiles containing handprints of more than 50 musicians who have played at the festival dot the sidewalk. Among those enshrined on the boulevard are Al Jarreau, B.B. King, Chick Corea, Clark Terry, Dave Brubeck, Dee Dee Bridgewater, Eddy Louiss, Elvin Jones, Fats Domino, Gary Peacock, George Benson, Hank Jones, Jack DeJohnette, Joshua Redman, Keith Jarrett, Little Richard, Oscar Peterson, Pat Metheny, Ravi Coltrane, Ray Charles, Richard Galliano, Roy Haynes, Shirley Horn, Sonny Rollins, Stéphane Grappelli, Steve Grossman, and Wynton Marsalis.

As part of the 61st Jazz à Juan Festival in 2022, New Orleans, Louisiana, became a sister city to Antibes.

Some notable performers have included Ray Charles, Count Basie, Kenny Ball, Les McCann, Fats Domino, Tubby Hayes, Dizzy Gillespie, Claude Luter, Jacques Denjean, Jimmy Smith, Pharoah Sanders, Nina Simone and Herbie Hancock.

== Discography ==
Several albums have been released from recordings made at the festival.

- Archie Shepp, Archie Shepp and the Full Moon Ensemble (1971)
- Bobby Hutcherson, Blow Up (1990)
- Charles Lloyd, The Flowering (1971)
- Charles Mingus, Mingus at Antibes (1974)
- Dizzy Gillespie, Dizzy on the French Riviera (1962)
- Duke Ellington, Soul Call (1967)
- Ella Fitzgerald, Ella at Juan-Les-Pins (1964)
- Ella Fitzgerald & Duke Ellington, Ella and Duke at the Cote D'Azur (1967)
- John Coltrane, Live in Antibes (1988), Live in Paris (1974)
- Keith Jarrett's Standards Trio, Up for It (2003)
- Miles Davis, Miles Davis in Europe (1964), 1969 Miles: Festiva de Juan Pins (1993), Live in Europe 1969: The Bootleg Series Vol. 2 (2013)
