= Hetty Kelly =

Irish dancer and performer (1893–1918)

- Kelly c. 1900s
- Born: Florence Henrietta Kelly; September 19, 1893; Westminster, Middlesex, United Kingdom
- Died: November 4, 1918 (aged 25); London, England
- Occupation: Dancer
- Spouse: Alan Edgar Horne (m. 1915)
- Partner: Charlie Chaplin (1908–1915)
- Relatives: Edith Kelly (sister)

Florence Henrietta "Hetty" Kelly (September 19, 1893 – November 4, 1918) was an Irish dancer and music hall performer and the first love of movie comedian Charlie Chaplin.

== Life ==
Kelly's father was a window-frame maker in Camberwell. Her sister Edith Kelly, a musical comedy actress, married American millionaire Frank Jay Gould, and later Albert de Courville. Her sister Mabel married the youngest son of Sir David Evans. Her brother, Arthur, became an executive for United Artists, which Chaplin cofounded. Hetty appeared in the original 1909 cast of The Arcadians and its revival. At the age of 21, she married Lieutenant (later "Sir") Alan Edgar Horne (1889–1984) in August 1915. Horne was a lieutenant in the Surrey Yeomanry. (In 1941 Horne succeeded his father to the Horne baronetcy of Shackleford, in Surrey.) The couple lived at 5 Tilney Street, Mayfair, London.

Charlie Chaplin met Kelly in 1908 in London when they were both performing for impresario Fred Karno at the Streatham Empire. She was with a song and dance troupe, Bert Coutts' Yankee-Doodle Girls, and Chaplin was playing a drunk in Mumming Birds. He was 19 and she was 15. He remembered her as "a slim gazelle, with a shapely oval face, a bewitching full mouth, and beautiful teeth". She came to be the female ideal in Chaplin's mind, and he re-created her in some of the female leads in his movies. Chaplin wrote in his autobiography, written in 1964, "Although I had met her but five times, and scarcely any of our meetings had lasted longer than twenty minutes, that brief encounter affected me for a long time." Chaplin wrote a letter to Hetty Kelly on July 18, 1918.

Kelly died in October 1918 in the Spanish flu epidemic that ravaged Europe in the wake of the First World War. Chaplin did not learn of her death until three years later in 1921, when Arthur Kelly informed him on a visit to England.

Kelly was played by American actress Moira Kelly in the 1992 film Chaplin, produced and directed by Richard Attenborough. Moira Kelly also played Chaplin's fourth and last wife, Oona O'Neill (who resembled Hetty Kelly), in the film.
