= Villa La Vigie, Juan-les-Pins =

Coordinates: 43.5642°N 7.1155°E

The Villa La Vigie is a villa in Juan-les-Pins on the Cote d'Azur in southern France. It was built in 1912 and was bought by the American railroad magnate Frank Jay Gould in 1927. The Spanish artist Pablo Picasso was resident at the villa in the summer of 1924.

== Location ==
The Villa La Vigie is situated at 30-37 Boulevard Edouard-Baudoin on the waterfront of Cap d'Antibes near Juan-les-Pins in Provence-Alpes-Côte d'Azur.

It was built in 1912 in a neo-Gothic style influenced by local Mediterranean architecture and is painted pink. 'La Vigie' means 'the lookout tower' or 'the vigil'. The house is 6,000 sq ft in size and has seven bedrooms and a similar number of bathrooms. It has a notable tower. It was acquired by the American railroad magnate Frank Jay Gould in late 1927. Gould's wife was the noted French socialite, Florence Lacaze who hosted numerous notable people at the house including Maurice Chevalier, Jean Cocteau, F. Scott Fitzgerald, André Gide, Mistinguett, Paul Morand and Pablo Picasso. Edward, Duke of Windsor and Wallis, Duchess of Windsor also visited Gould at the house. The painter Jean Gabriel Domergue stayed at the villa until his own was built in Cannes. The gates of the villa were designed by Philippe Roy.

In 1924 Picasso painted the Villa La Vigie as seen from the Villa Chêne Roc across the street, Boulevard Edouard-Baudoin. The boulevard was widened in 1956 and the Villa Chêne Roc was demolished. Gould asked for a building sympathetic to the Hotel Belles Rives to be built on the plot of the Villa Chêne Roc, and the new building designed by Marcel Guilgot was joined to the Villa La Vigie. The Villa La Vigie was classified as a French Monument historique in 2000.

== Pablo Picasso at the villa, Summer 1924 ==
The Spanish artist Pablo Picasso stayed at the villa with his family in the summer of 1924, from 29 July to 26 September. The composer Igor Stravinsky and his four children arrived in Nice shortly after Picasso, and Stravinsky's children caught diphtheria. Picasso stayed away from the Stravinsky family and insisted that the composer visit him instead. Picasso also enjoyed visits from the actor Pierre Bertin and his wife, the pianist Marcelle Meyer, while at the villa. He was also visited by John Dos Passos, Archibald MacLeish, Donald Ogden Stewart and George Seldes.

Gertrude Stein and Alice B. Toklas declined an invitation from Picasso's wife Olga to join them at the villa. Gerald and Sara Murphy stayed at the nearby Hôtel du Cap in Antibes, as did F. Scott and Zelda Fitzgerald. Picasso had stayed at the Hôtel du Cap the previous year, but saw less of the Murphys and Fitzgeralds in 1924. His relative remoteness from the two couples fuelled his productivity. Picasso's biographer, John Richardson, described the summer of 1924 as "productive and innovative" and he had "sufficient space, privacy, and peace of mind to make a prodigious forward leap".

He made his first drawing on 23 July, the day they arrived at the villa, of three bathers. He used the garage of the villa which was set on the other side of the road from the house as a studio. Picasso painted the walls of the garage which upset the owner of the Villa, who insisted that he had them repainted. No photographs exist of the painted garage walls. His first major painting of the summer at the villa was the Still Life with Mandolin, now in the collection of the Stedelijk Museum Amsterdam. The second major still life, Still Life with a Mandolin, is in the collection of the National Gallery of Ireland in Dublin. It was bought by Sara Murphy's sister, Hoytie Wiborg. The third still life, Mandolin with Guitar, was one of the largest that Picasso ever painted. It is now in the collection of the Solomon R. Guggenheim Museum in New York City.
