= Dorothy Gould Burns =

American socialite expat (1904–1969)

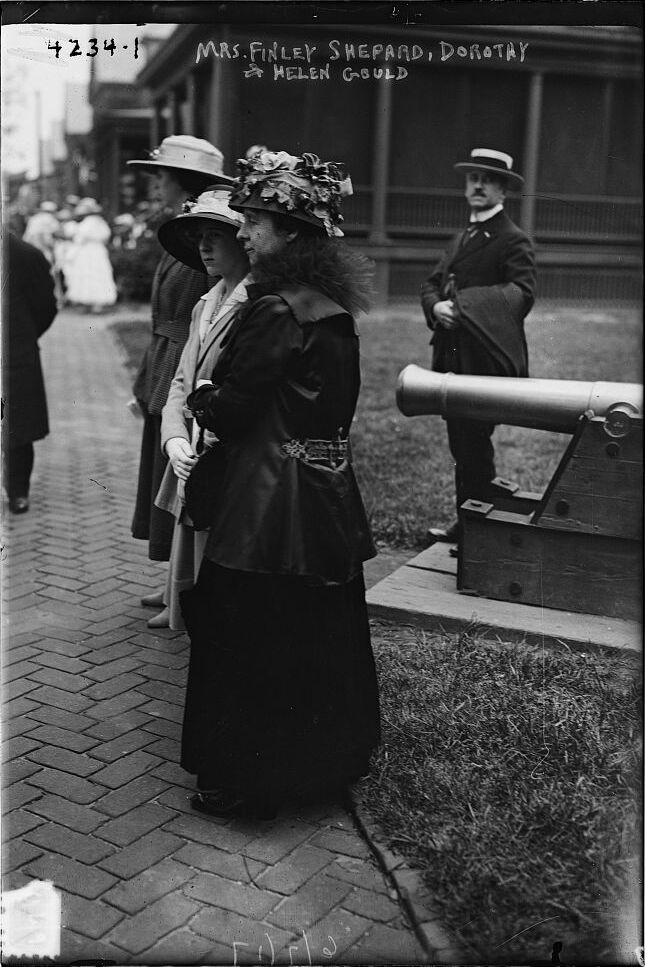
- Mrs. Finley Shepard, Dorothy & Helen Gould
- Born: Dorothy Gould; March 24, 1904; New York City, U.S.
- Died: July 6, 1969 (aged 65)
- Spouses: Baron Roland Graffenried de Villars (m. 1925; div. 1936) Archibald Burns (m. 1944; died 1950)
- Children: 2
- Parent(s): Frank Jay Gould; Helen Margaret Kelly
- Relatives: Jay Gould (grandfather)

Dorothy Gould Burns (March 24, 1904 – July 6, 1969), known as Baroness Dorothy de Graffenried de Villars during her first marriage, was an American socialite. She was the subject of a court case concerning when a United States citizen who lives overseas has undergone expatriation or has become a dual national and thus still subject to United States taxation.

== Early life ==
Dorothy Gould was born in New York City in 1904 to Frank Jay Gould and Helen Margaret Kelly. Her parents divorced and her father remarried twice, including to Florence La Caze whom he married in 1923 and remained married until his death in 1956. Her sister, Helen Marguerite Gould, was the wife of Raymond, Baron of Montenach.

She was the granddaughter of the railroad magnate Jay Gould.

In 1919 she left the United States for Europe, and she never re-established a legal residence in the United States.

== Personal life ==
On May 5, 1925, she married a Swiss citizen, Baron Roland Graffenried de Villars (1899–1978) in Paris at a private ceremony at the Church of Notre Dame de Passy. Roland was the second son of Baron Eduard Anton Friedrich Paul Maria Graffenried de Villars and Laure Therese Marie de Chollet. He briefly worked with her father. Before their divorce in 1936, they had two daughters:

- Rolande Graffenried de Villars (b. 1925)
- Dorothy Graffenried de Villars (b. 1927), who married Alexandre Borgia. They divorced and she later married Jacques Auguste Maurice Juge. They also divorced.

During this period she traveled as a citizen of the United States using a United States passport which expired in 1934. The United States Department of State refused to renew her United States passport, so she traveled under an "affidavit in lieu of passport" issued by the American Consulate in Switzerland. When the Germans occupied France, she returned to the United States in 1941 on a newly issued United States passport. She remained only briefly and entered Cuba where she met her second husband, Archibald Burns, a Mexican national of Scottish parents. She traveled with him to Mexico where they married in 1944. He might have been a polo player.

She died on July 6, 1969.

=== Estate and taxation ===
When her estate's executor applied for a $24,000 refund relating to certain gift and income taxes she had paid on the grounds that she had abandoned US citizenship, the Internal Revenue Service disputed the claim, asserting that the abandonment never took place, and her estate was thus also liable to $3.25 million in estate tax. The US position was upheld by the United States District Court for the Southern District of New York, and subsequently affirmed by the United States Court of Appeals for the Second Circuit. The Second Circuit held that the estate could not succeed in its claim, because of the doctrines of estoppel and laches that arose out of her assertions that she had remained an American citizen.

== See also ==
- Citizenship in the United States
- United States nationality law
