= Minaudière =

Women's fashion accessory generally considered a jewellery piece

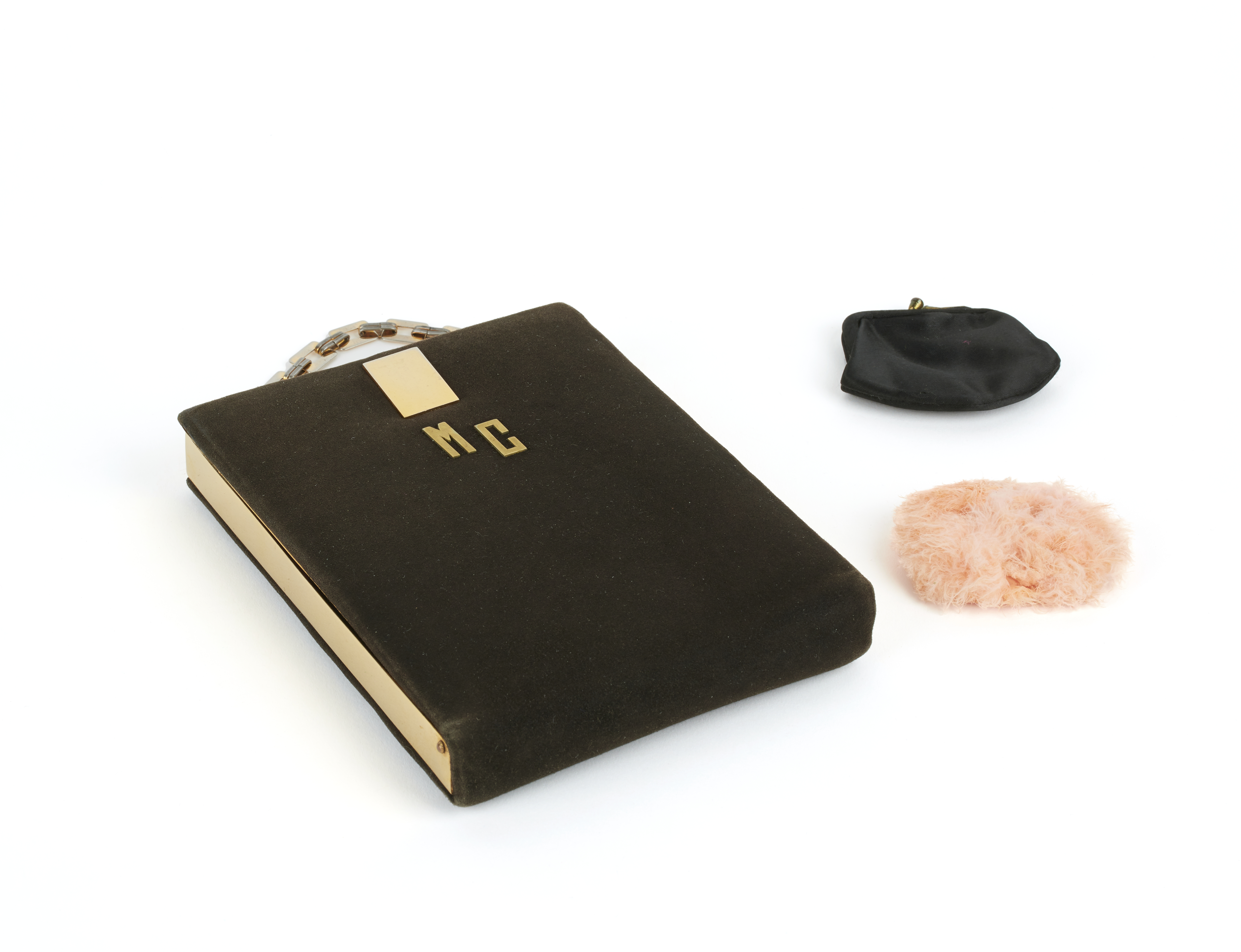
A minaudière from 1938

A minaudière, or vanity case, is a women's fashion accessory, generally considered a jewellery piece, intended to substitute for an evening bag. A case with compartments, it allows storage for several items in a small space, such as a makeup compact, lipstick, watch, reading glasses, or keys.

The minaudière appeared during the 1930s. Its invention is attributed to Charles Arpels, of Van Cleef & Arpels, but many jewellers and haute couture designers have created their own models.

== Description ==
Generally metal plated and oblong, sized small enough to be held within the hand, a minaudière is a dainty accessory. The materials used to make it are most frequently rigid, with a metallic finish such as gold or silver. The exterior may be detailed with precious or semi-precious stones, or decorated with lacquer or mother of pearl. However, textile designs also exist, with cloth overlaying a frame or flexible and supple, using velour, silk or brocade fabric, embroidered or not.

Some minaudières include a lanyard or chain to place over the wrist. Other designs have a satin or velour pouch to hold the minaudière.

The interior can reveal the ingenuity of the designer. A minaudière may contain several small compartments, carefully designed to organize the owner's personal items for maximum utility.

According to fashion journalist Lloyd Boston, a minaudière constitutes an "essential" part of an evening wardrobe, a small object with no limit to its usefulness, and a "fabulous character".

== Invention ==
According to press articles of the time the minaudière was invented by Van Cleef & Arpels in 1934. Charles Arpels was inspired by watching Florence Gould, third wife of philanthropist Frank Jay Gould, toss several small, loose makeup items into a tin box.

The word "minaudière" was a French term for a coquettish woman, from the word "minauder" (to flirt or simper).

== See also ==
- Étui
- Compact
