= 77 Park Lane =

Play by Walter Hackett

77 Park Lane is a play in two acts by Walter Hackett. The play was staged in London's West End in 1928 and again in 1930. The play was the basis for three different films; all made by Albert de Courville.

== Plot ==
Lord Trent, a British peer, steals a taxi on Boat Race Night. He returns to his home at 77 Park Lane to unexpectedly discover that his home has been taken over by a gambling club. He pretends that he is the taxi driver and joins in with the gamblers. A murder occurs, a woman's life is in danger, and ultimately Lord Trent put things to rights after a series of wild adventures.

== History ==
77 Park Lane premiered at St Martin's Theatre in London's West End on October 25, 1928 with a cast led by Hugh Wakefield as Lord Trent, and Hackett' wife, the actress Marion Lorne, as Mary Connor.

The Evening Standard described the play's plot as "far-fetched" but felt that the play was an effective comedy. The Daily Mirror gave a highly positive review, with its critic asserting that "Hackett has mixed farce, comedy, and melodrama together in a skillful and original way. His play is as good as any seen in London in a long time." The Guardian gave a mixed review. Its critic stated that "It was a pity that Mr. Hackett could not sustain the promise of his first act, for that was considerable. The author was bidding a picturesque farewell to the old Park Lane No 77 will be turned into super-flats for supermen tomorrow. In its present form is far too good to be durable."

77 Park Lane was later revived in the West End at the Regent Theatre in 1930.

== Adaptations ==
77 Park Lane was adapted into two different 1931 films by Albert de Courville; an English language film of the same name and the French language film 77 Rue Chalgrin. Courville joined with Fernando Gomis to adapt the play into a third film, Between Night and Day (1932).
