= Bessie De Voie =

American actress and dancer (1880's–1974)

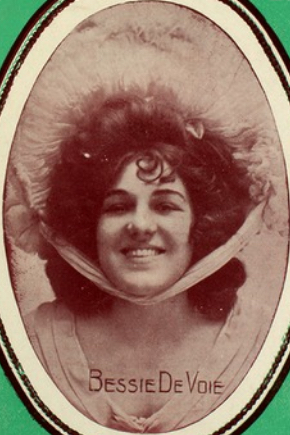
- Bessie De Voie, from a 1906 sheet music publication.
- Born: Elizabeth Van Dorn; 1880s Bedford, Indiana, U.S.
- Died: June 30, 1974; Bridgeport, Connecticut, U.S.
- Other names: Bessie Devoie, Bessie Van Dorn, Elizabeth Van Dorn
- Occupations: Dancer, vaudeville performer
- Years active: 1900–1917
- Known for: Involvement with Frank Jay Gould

Bessie De Voie (born Elizabeth Van Dorn; in the 1880s – June 30, 1974) was an American actress and dancer of vaudeville and the musical theatre. Her personal life was in the headlines from 1908 to 1910, due to her relationship with Frank Jay Gould.

== Early life ==
Bessie De Voie's origins were told in various ways in the press of her day. She was described by the Detroit Free Press as being from Mount Clemens, Michigan. Other sources described her as being from Virginia, and "known in private life as Bessie van Dorn." Still other reports said she was from Kentucky, or had at lived in Paducah, Kentucky, the daughter of Robert Van Dorn, a railroad engineer who died in a train accident in 1893. Other stories placed her hometown in Evansville, Indiana.

Her 1974 obituary gives her birth name as Elizabeth Van Dorn, and her birthplace as Bedford, Indiana. The obituary suggests a birthdate of 1888; but she began touring the United States as a dancer by 1899, making a somewhat earlier birthdate more likely. Her parents, Robert Van Dorn and May Clark Van Dorn, married around 1883.

== Career ==
De Voie began her career before 1900, and was half of Young and De Voie, an "eccentric soft shoe dancers" act with fellow dancer Frank C. Young. She also played soubrette roles. Young and De Voie danced in the touring shows A Hole in the Ground (1900–1901), A Trip to Chinatown (1901), and Hunting for Hawkins (1901–1902). De Voie was discovered by actress Maxine Elliott and replaced Paula Edwardes in The Show Girl (1902). In 1904 she was part of the large Rogers Brothers Company, in the same cast as Fred Niblo. Her Broadway appearances included the musicals Mr. Bluebeard (1903), The Rogers Brothers in Paris (1904), The Rogers Brothers in Ireland (1905–1906), The Dairymaids (1907). De Voie was in the cast of Mr. Bluebeard when it played at the Iroquois Theatre on the night of a fire in 1903, the deadliest single-building fire in American history.

De Voie left the stage during the years of legal entanglement, but returned to higher fees after her fame had increased. "It is a lamentable fact that where hundreds went to see the girl who was simply pretty and a graceful dancer before, thousands will now flock to see the dancer who thought she was going to marry Frank Gould," commented the National Tribune in 1910. Variety reported that her 1910 vaudeville appearance, intended to exploit the high interest in her, was unsuccessful, and noted that "Where a woman – or a man – will make use of publicity through private affairs to secure an engagement or a re-engagement on the stage, no one regrets seeing him or her do a 'flop'."

Later shows featuring De Voie were Our Miss Gibbs (1910), Three Twins (1910), Louisiana Lou (1912–1913), with Sophie Tucker, and The Doll Girl (1914) with Hattie Williams and Richard Carle. She danced with Al B. White in 1913, Dare Phillips in 1914, and with Guy Livingston in 1915. In 1917, she was in Pom Pom with Mitzi Hajos.

== Personal life ==
Bessie De Voie was named in the 1908 society divorce between Frank Jay Gould and Helen Margaret Kelly. In 1909, she sued Gould for fraud and misrepresentation, and asked $250,000 ($8,958,333 in today's money) in compensation for breaking a promise to marry her. She published letters Gould sent her, "containing many expressions of affection". The scandal sparked headlines across the United States in 1909 and 1910. The suit was settled when Gould paid De Voie $10,000.

Bessie Van Dorn became a saleswoman after 1920. She retired in 1962, and died in a convalescent hospital in Bridgeport, Connecticut in 1974, about ninety years of age. Her gravesite is in Mattoon, Illinois.
