= Helen Miller Shepard =

American philanthropist (1868–1938)

Helen Miller Gould Shepard
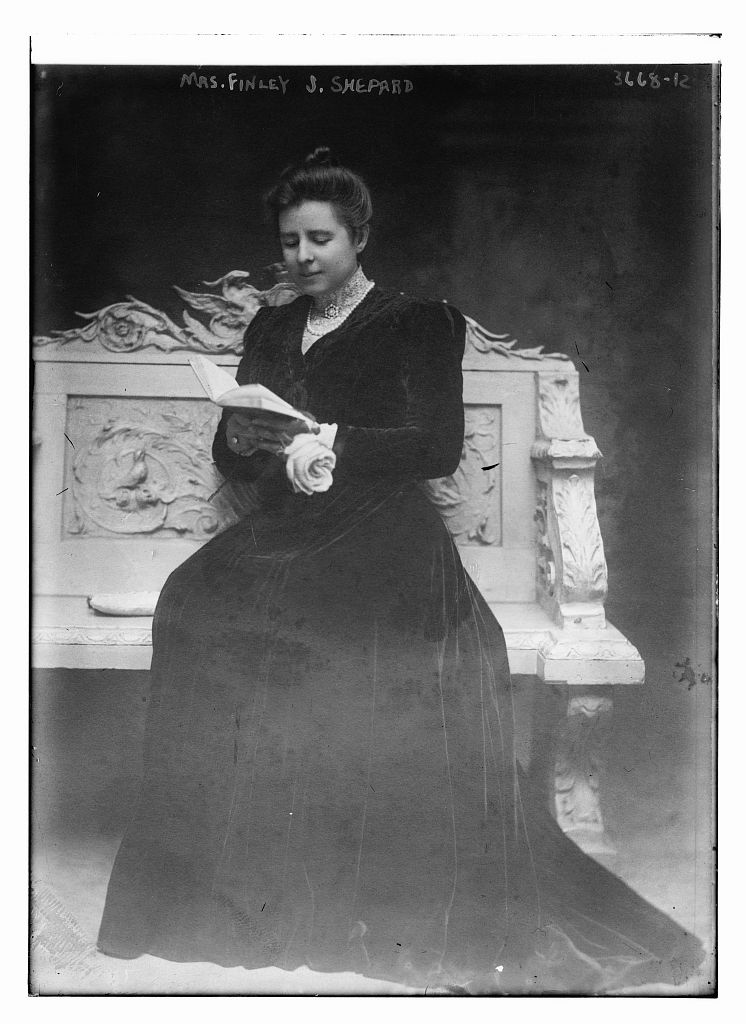
- Born: Helen Miller Gould; June 20, 1868; New York City, US
- Died: December 21, 1938 (aged 70); Roxbury, New York, US
- Occupation: Philanthropist
- Spouse: Finley Johnson Shepard (m. 1913)
- Children: 3
- Parent(s): Jay Gould; Helen Day Miller
- Relatives: siblings: George Jay Gould; Edwin Gould Sr.; Howard Gould; Anna Gould; Frank Jay Gould

Helen Miller Gould Shepard (June 20, 1868 – December 21, 1938) was a prominent American philanthropist and member of the wealthy Gould family. In contrast to her father, the ruthless railroad magnate Jay Gould, who was a highly unpopular figure during his lifetime, she became known as "America's Sweetheart."

== Early life and family ==
Born in Manhattan, New York City, as Helen "Nellie" Miller Gould, she was the firstborn daughter and one of six children of railroad tycoon Jay Gould and Helen Day Miller (1838–1889). Her sister Anna Gould would become another prominent heiress. Her older brother Edwin Gould, a railway official and investor, was also a noted philanthropist.

The Gould children spent much of their childhood between Manhattan and Lyndhurst, the family summer estate in Tarrytown, New York. After her father's death in 1892 (her mother had died three years prior), Helen found herself the caretaker of the youngest siblings and the estate, formally purchasing Lyndhurst in 1899. To be able to independently manage her large inheritance and the estate, she enrolled in New York University School of Law, from which she graduated in 1895. She married railroad executive Finley Johnson Shepard (1867–1942) "for love" at the age of 45. They met during one of the trips she used to take to inspect her father's railroad network. The marriage took place on January 22, 1913.

They adopted three children and had one foster child, Louis Seton. The adopted children were:

- Finley Jay (named for Finley Johnson Shepard and Jay Gould), a three-year-old abandoned child who was found on the steps of Manhattan's St Patrick's Cathedral in 1914,
- Olivia Margaret (named for Helen's dear friend Mrs. Russell Sage),
- Helen Anna (named for Helen and her sister, Anna).

Helen had also cared for her brother Frank Gould's two daughters, Helen Margaret (b. 1902 and Dorothy (b. 1904) by his first wife, Helen Kelly.

== Philanthropy ==
Helen Miller Gould Shepard spent more money on philanthropy than any other American woman of her time. At the commencement of the Spanish–American War, she donated US$100,000 to the United States government in support of the war. She gave an additional US$50,000 toward military hospital supplies and was active in the Women's National War Relief Association, working in a hospital for wounded soldiers in New York City and hosting convalescing soldiers on her Lyndhurst estate. Her war effort earned her the sobriquet "America's Sweetheart" and praise from the U.S. House of Representatives in the form of a Congressional bill passed in February 1899. Numerous American flags, sent to her by military regiments she supported, were proudly displayed in her Fifth Avenue home in New York City.

In memory of her father, she funded the Gould Memorial Library as the central library of New York University's (NYU) Bronx campus and endowed its Hall of Fame. It was the first of her many donations to her alma mater. She made significant contributions to other educational institutions, from Rutgers College in New Jersey to American Robert College of Istanbul in Turkey, as well as to the American Red Cross, the Daughters of the American Revolution, and other organizations. Both the YMCA and the YWCA benefited from her significant contributions, for which she was highly praised by President Theodore Roosevelt in a 1903 speech. She was a member of the board of the Russell Sage Foundation and of the national board of the YWCA. She was a supporter of the John More Association, a family group she was a leading member of. She hosted portions of the association's quinquennial reunions at her Roxbury home from 1895 until her final reunion in 1935. Olivia Sage, a leading advocate for women's education, was her close personal friend and mentor.

On the witness stand during an eleven-year legal dispute among Jay Gould's heirs, she was asked how much money she had given away, to which she replied: "I do not know how much money I gave away, but I think I gave away most of it." Even so, The New York Times would state in her obituary that "by judicious investment, she trebled her inheritance before resigning as a trustee of the Gould estate in 1927."

For information on her charitable work at the Lyndhurst estate, see Lyndhurst--Role of Helen Miller Gould Shepard.

== Religious and Political Views ==
Her Christian faith was central to her life and extensive philanthropy. She attended both Episcopal and Presbyterian services and was particularly active in the Presbyterian Church. A member of the American Tract Society, she wrote and printed a variety of religious materials, including tracts, booklets, and leaflets. In 1918, she and Emma Baker Kennedy (c. 1833–1930) became the first female vice presidents of the American Bible Society.

She was a prominent and vocal anti-communist and anti-atheist. She began campaigning publicly against Bolshevism around the time of the First Red Scare in the early 1920s. Highly respected in conservative social circles, she used her position to speak out against what she perceived as a revolutionary threat to American society and values. She may have rescinded some scholarship grants to Vassar College because she became convinced that even the students at Vassar had grown dangerously radical and atheist.

== Kirkside ==
At the time of his death, her father, Jay Gould, was a benefactor in the reconstruction of the Reformed Church in Roxbury, New York, his birthplace. She completed the reconstruction, and the church is now known as the Jay Gould Memorial Reformed Church. It is located within the town's Main Street Historic District, listed on the National Register of Historic Places in 1988.

In 1893, she purchased property with a farmhouse near the church, and in 1896, she converted the farmhouse into a summer mansion, which she called Kirkside (“beside the church”), using the Scottish word "kirk" for "church" in honor of her father's Scottish ancestry. She expanded the property to include extensive, landscaped grounds designed by master gardener Ferdinand Mangold, who worked for several generations of Lyndhurst owners. Construction of the 9-hole Shephard Hills Golf Course began around 1916; upon completion, it served the estate and its guests. The lake on the estate supplied ice for the community in winter and was open to local residents for recreation in summer.

== Death ==
She died after a series of strokes on December 21, 1938, at Kirkside. Her passing was broadly reported by the press as that of "an extraordinary daughter of an extraordinary father, of an extraordinary family." Some 1,500 people attended the funeral services at the St. Nicholas Collegiate Reformed Protestant Dutch Church in Manhattan, including Vice Admiral Clark H. Woodward and other veterans of the Spanish-American War. She was buried in the Gould family mausoleum at Woodlawn Cemetery, The Bronx, New York, on December 23, 1938.
