= Le Provençal =

Former luxury hotel in Juan-les-Pins, France

Hôtel Provençal
- Le Provençal
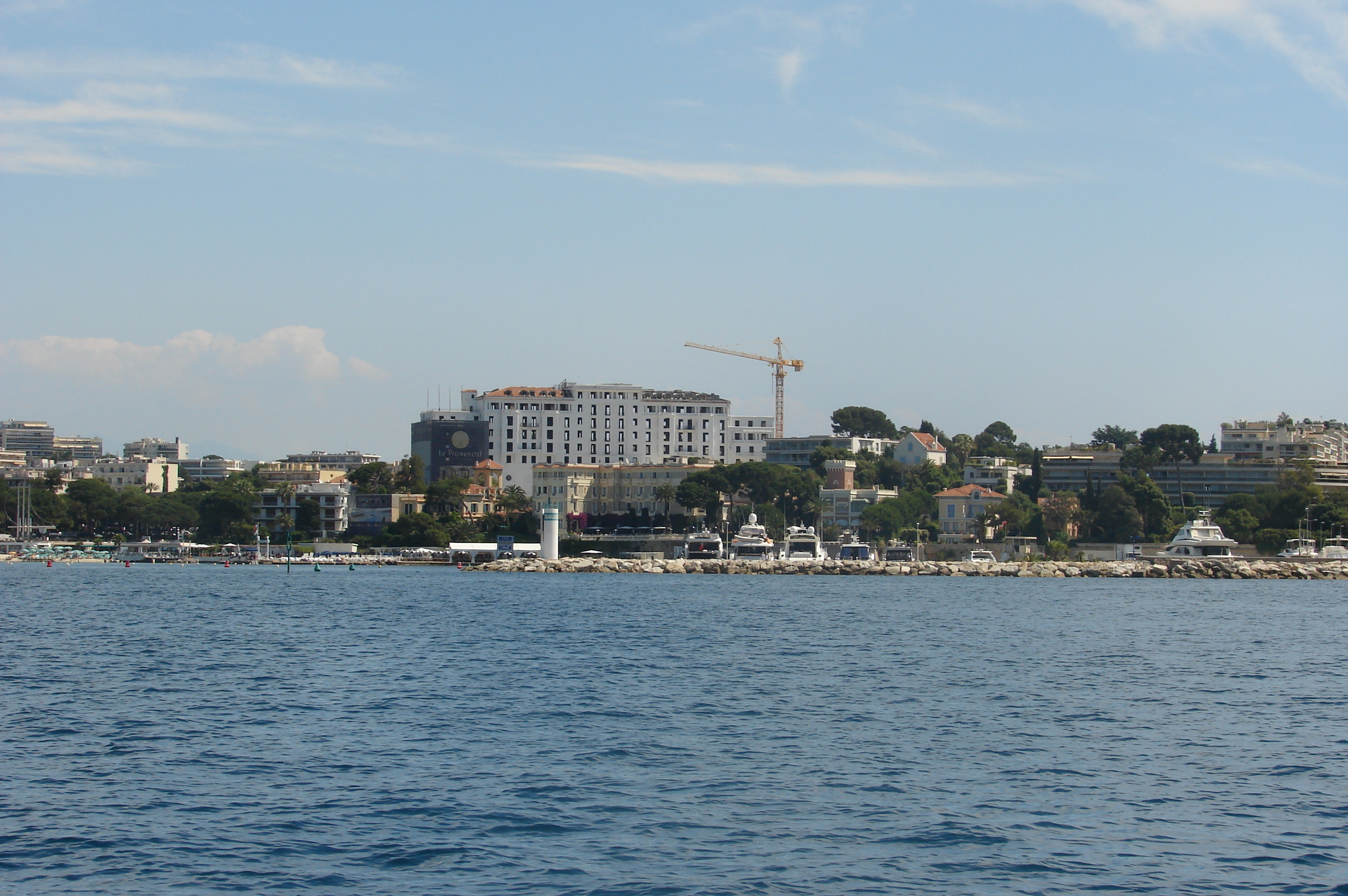
- The former Hôtel Provençal near Cap d'Antibes, photographed in 2011

General information
- Status: Converted into residences
- Type: Former luxury hotel; residential development
- Architectural style: Art Deco
- Location: Juan-les-Pins, Antibes, Alpes-Maritimes, France, 22 boulevard Édouard-Baudoin
- Completed: 1927
- Opened: 1927
- Closed: 1976 or 1977
- Client: Frank Jay Gould

Design and construction
- Architect: Lucien Stable
- Developer: John Caudwell
- Known for: Jazz Age Riviera hotel; later derelict landmark; 21st-century restoration

Hôtel Provençal, also known as Le Provençal, is a former luxury hotel in Juan-les-Pins, in the commune of Antibes, on the French Riviera. Built in 1927 for the American businessman Frank Jay Gould and designed by the Cannes architect Lucien Stable, it was conceived as a modern palace hotel facing the sea, intended to keep wealthy visitors in the centre of the resort rather than at the established palace hotels of Cap d'Antibes.

The hotel became one of the best-known buildings associated with the interwar rise of Juan-les-Pins as a fashionable resort. Later cultural histories associate it with guests including Winston Churchill, Lilian Harvey, Charlie Chaplin and Miles Davis. During the post-war period, it also formed part of the cultural setting of Jazz à Juan, including Duke Ellington's circle during the 1966 festival.

== Closure and Dereliction ==
In 1975, the assets of Société La Gauloise were bought by the Paris jeweller Alexandre Reza. The hotel closed in the late 1970s. The Antibes Juan-les-Pins municipal website gives 1976 as the year of closure, while The Times and other accounts give 1977.

After closure, the building remained empty for decades and became one of the most visible derelict structures in Juan-les-Pins. Several redevelopment schemes were proposed but not completed. The regional heritage inventory lists unrealised projects by the Nice architects Allard and Truffaut in 1986, the Paris architect Herbert in 1987, Février and Giauffret with Jean Foussa, and Jean Foussa alone in 2004. These schemes were opposed by a Cap d'Antibes protection association and were not carried out.

In 2006, British businessman Cyril Dennis acquired Le Provençal through Provençal Investments SA with the aim of converting it into 60 apartments. The project did not proceed. After a fire on the ground floor in 2012, Dennis sold Provençal Investments SA to British businessman John Caudwell, founder of Phones 4u.

== Caudwell Redevelopment ==
Caudwell acquired the building in 2014 through his property company and began a long redevelopment project. The work converted the former hotel into a luxury residential development while major parts of its historic exterior were retained and restored.

The Antibes Juan-les-Pins municipal website described the transformation as being carried out under the supervision of the Architecte des Bâtiments de France and stated that the restoration respected the building's 1920s architecture. It also reported that the 24,000-square-metre building had been converted into 35 high-end apartments, with Mediterranean gardens, a 500-square-metre spa, a private cinema, nine pools, seven shops and a restaurant.

Other reports have described the restored complex as containing 41 residences. The Times reported in 2026 that Caudwell had spent about £300 million on the project and that around 40 per cent of the residences had sold by that point.

In 2025, Caudwell partnered with the nearby Hôtel Belles Rives to provide concierge services for Le Provençal residents. The Financial Times reported in 2026 that the restoration of Le Provençal formed part of a wider revival of Juan-les-Pins, alongside an €18 million seafront renovation.

== Location ==
Hôtel Provençal stands at 22 Boulevard Édouard-Baudoin in Juan-les-Pins, near the entrance to Cap d'Antibes and close to the seafront. Its position, at the edge of the pine grove and facing the sea, formed part of Gould's plan to create a palace hotel within the resort itself.

The wider district includes the Pinède Gould, named after Frank Jay Gould, and the nearby Hôtel Belles Rives, the former Villa Saint-Louis, associated with F. Scott Fitzgerald and the interwar literary history of Juan-les-Pins.

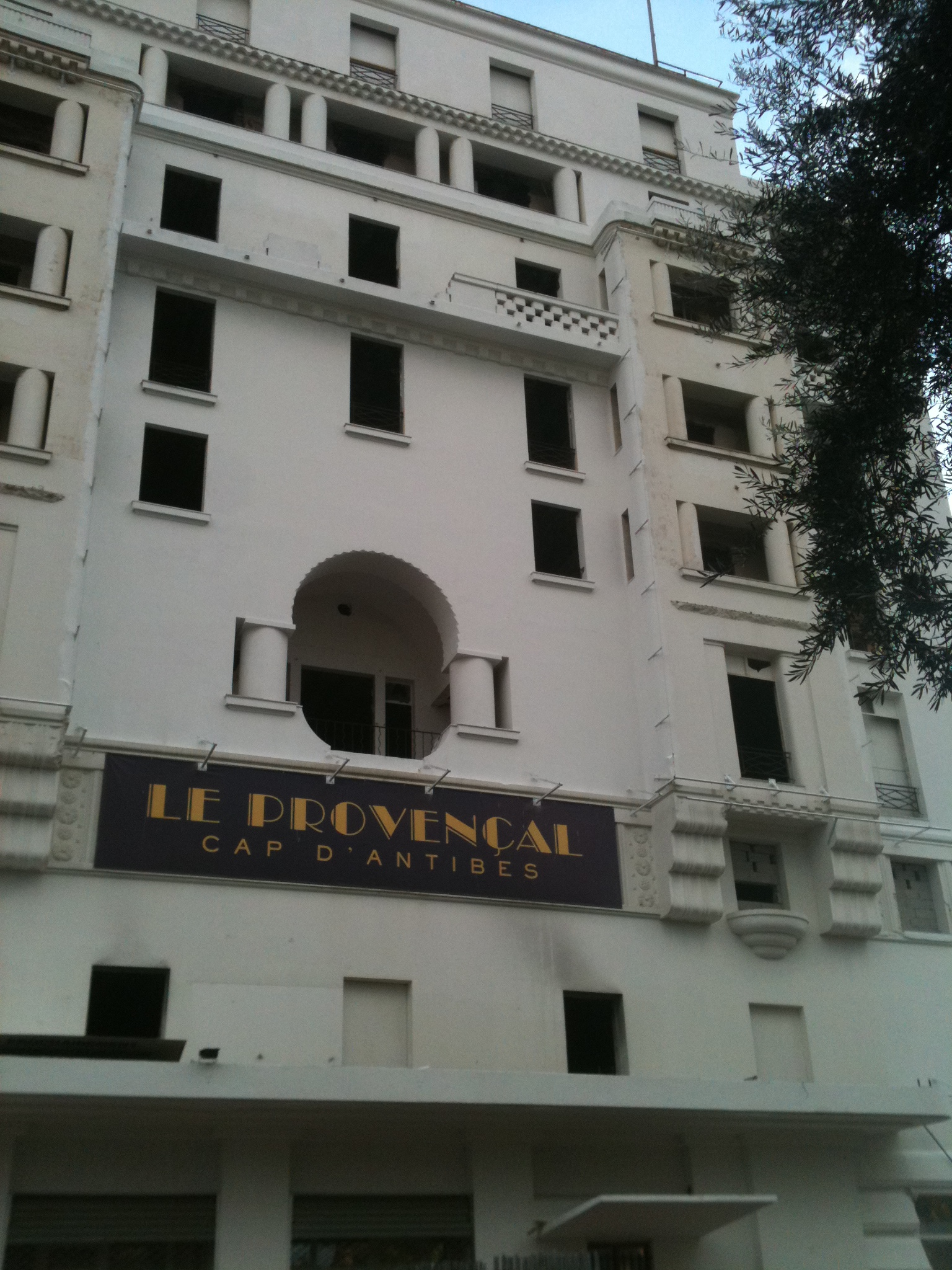
Le Provençal during its derelict period, photographed in 2011.

== Origins and Construction ==
The hotel was commissioned by Frank Jay Gould, son of the American financier Jay Gould. Gould lived in Juan-les-Pins at the Villa La Vigie and invested in several French resort developments, including the Palais de la Méditerranée in Nice.

The building was designed by Lucien Stable, a Cannes-based architect trained at the École des Beaux-Arts in Paris. Stable was active from the 1920s to the 1950s and also designed the Hôtel George V in Cannes and villas in Antibes.

Construction was completed in 1927. The regional heritage inventory describes the project as a high-class modern palace hotel, built to receive a wealthy clientele and to rival the luxury accommodation available at the Grand Hôtel du Cap while keeping visitors in Juan-les-Pins.

== Architecture ==
The hotel was built in masonry and concrete in an Art Deco style. The original structure had a regular plan, with a symmetrical main block formed by a seven-storey central section and two six-storey wings. It also included west and east wings, terraces, a car porch before the main entrance, ordered south, east and west façades, and a north façade with regular bays.

The south and west façades were marked by oriels and stepped spandrels. The ground floor was lit by round-headed bays rising through two levels, while the upper floors included running balconies on the south and west sides. An open gallery with double columns crowned the south, east and west façades.

Inside, the ground floor contained a dining room of about 300 m^{2} (3,200 sq ft), salons, library spaces and a beauty institute. The upper floors, served by stairs and a lift, contained 254 rooms and six apartments. Basement levels held kitchens, stores and maintenance workshops.

Between 1933 and 1938, the building underwent alterations, including the addition of a semi-circular central projection on the south façade. This housed offices on the ground floor and a bar above, linked to the vestibule.

== Interwar Prominence ==
The hotel opened during the period in which Juan-les-Pins was being remade as a fashionable summer resort. Later cultural histories describe Hôtel Provençal as part of the rise of the modern French Riviera, where American capital, European aristocracy, writers, artists and entertainers shaped the resort culture of the 1920s and 1930s.

The German journalist and filmmaker Lutz Hachmeister used the history of the building as the basis for his 2021 book Hôtel Provençal: Eine Geschichte der Côte d'Azur, published by C. Bertelsmann. The Bibliothèque nationale du Luxembourg describes the hotel as one of the most modern and striking hotels on the Côte d'Azur when it opened in 1927, and identifies Churchill, Harvey, Chaplin and Davis among people who stayed there.

== War Damage and Post-war Alterations ==
The hotel was damaged during the bombardments of August 1944. A restoration campaign and a series of interior alterations followed after the war. During this work, the terrace roof over the west wing was replaced by a pitched tiled roof.

Further minor changes followed after Gould's death in 1956. The regional heritage inventory notes that the hotel sign on the west façade was moved up by one level to create windows in the upper storey after a change in management.

== Jazz and Cultural Associations ==
After the Second World War, Juan-les-Pins became closely associated with jazz through the Festival Mondial du Jazz, later known as Jazz à Juan. Hôtel Provençal formed part of this cultural setting.

Jazz singer Lilian Terry recalled a scene at the hotel during the 1966 Jazz Festival, when she was photographed in Duke Ellington's suite with Ellington, Billy Strayhorn and Stevie James. Terry described the group as having “breakfast at midday” in the suite.

Modern accounts also associate the hotel with Ella Fitzgerald, who performed at Juan-les-Pins during the 1960s and whose former suite has been marketed as part of the restored residential development.

== Notable guests and visitors ==
The hotel is frequently associated with writers, politicians, musicians, film stars and members of high society. Hachmeister's history, as summarised by the Bibliothèque nationale du Luxembourg, names Winston Churchill, Lilian Harvey, Charlie Chaplin and Miles Davis among people who stayed at the hotel.

Modern press accounts also associate the hotel with figures including Coco Chanel, Marilyn Monroe, Estée Lauder, Ernest Hemingway and Pablo Picasso. The National reported that Charlie Chaplin lived at the hotel in 1931 while taking a break after filming City Lights, and that later guests included Jackie Kennedy, Marilyn Monroe, Paul McCartney, Ringo Starr and Tom Jones.

Because many celebrity associations rely on retrospective press accounts rather than surviving guest registers, they are best treated as reported associations rather than independently verified stays.

== In historical writing, film and archives ==
The history of the building was the subject of Lutz Hachmeister's 2021 book Hôtel Provençal: Eine Geschichte der Côte d'Azur, published by C. Bertelsmann. Hachmeister had earlier made the documentary Hôtel Provençal: Aufstieg und Fall der Riviera, first broadcast by Arte and ZDF in 2000.

The regional heritage inventory lists historical documentation for the building, including early photographs, exterior and interior views, construction images, and the original building permit file held by the Antibes municipal archives. FranceArchives lists a 1965 visual record of a Provençal-style room at the hotel.

== See also ==
- Juan-les-Pins
- Antibes
- Cap d'Antibes
- French Riviera
- Frank Jay Gould
- John Caudwell
- Jazz à Juan
- Hôtel Belles Rives
- Hôtel du Cap-Eden-Roc
