= Alan Horne =

Alan Horn or Horne may refer to:

- Alan F. Horn, chairman of Walt Disney Studios
- Sir Alan Edgar Horne, 2nd Baronet (1889–1984) of the Horne Baronets
- Sir Alan Gray Antony Horne, 3rd Baronet (b. 1948) of the Horne Baronets
