= 77 Park Lane (film) =

1931 British film by Albert de Courville

- Campaign book cover
- Directed by: Albert de Courville
- Screenplay by: Michael Powell; Reginald Berkeley
- Based on: play 77 Park Lane (1928) by Walter Hackett
- Produced by: William Hutter
- Starring: Dennis Neilson-Terry; Betty Stockfeld; Malcolm Keen; Ben Welden
- Cinematography: Geoffrey Faithfull; Mutz Greenbaum
- Edited by: Arthur Seabourne
- Production company: Famous Players Guild
- Distributed by: United Artists Corporation (UK)
- Release dates: 2 July 1931 (London, UK)
- Running time: 82 minutes
- Country: United Kingdom
- Language: English

77 Park Lane is a 1931 British thriller film directed by Albert de Courville and starring Dennis Neilson-Terry, Betty Stockfeld and Malcolm Keen. It was written by Michael Powell and Reginald Berkeley based on a 1928 play of the same name by Walter Hackett, and was shot at Walton Studios. A French-language version, 77 Rue Chalgrin, and a Spanish-language version, Between Night and Day, were made at the same time.

== Premise ==
At an upmarket gambling house in Park Lane, a woman tries to save her brother from ruin.

== Cast ==
- Dennis Neilson-Terry as Lord Brent
- Betty Stockfeld as Mary Connor
- Malcolm Keen as Sherringham
- Ben Welden as Sinclair
- Cecil Humphreys as Paul
- Esmond Knight as Philip Connor
- Molly Johnson as Eve Grayson
- Roland Culver as Sir Richard Carrington
- Molesworth Blow as George Malton
- John Turnbull as Superintendent
- Percival Coyte as Donovan

== Reception ==
Kine Weekly wrote: "A comedy melodrama, adapted from the successful play, which has polished technique, and is well characterised. The direction, however, is not good, the main issues being rather obscured by irrelevant detail. The picture, nevertheless, has its bright moments, and carries many popular thrills. ... Dennis Neilson-Terry is not too well cast as Brent, is a little too facetious, but is easy in his manner, and has a likeable personality. Betty Stockfeld, who has charm and a most intriguing speaking voice, is altogether an admirable selection as Mary, while Malcolm Keen is an effectively sinister Sheringham. Ben Welden, Esmond Knight and John Turnbull are satisfactory in the major supporting roles. Albert de Courville's first essay into production has resulted in some ingenious and novel technical work, but the story telling is not too clear. However, there are a number of really gripping situations, and not a few surprising, while the comedy element is polished, and admirably balances the whole."

Picture Show wrote: "Good melodramatic story that has not heen too well treated filmically. Dennis Neilson-Terry gives a polished performance in the leading role, and is well supported, but the direction robs the film of much of its effectiveness."
