= Between Night and Day =

1932 British film by Albert de Courville and Fernando Gomis

- Theatrical release poster
- Directed by: Albert de Courville; Fernando Gomis
- Written by: Reginald Berkeley; Michael Powell; José Luis Salado
- Based on: 77 Park Lane, a 1928 play by Walter Hackett
- Produced by: William Hutter
- Distributed by: United Artists
- Release date: 1931
- Country: United Kingdom
- Language: Spanish

Between Night and Day (Spanish: Entre noche y día) is a 1931 British Spanish-language mystery film directed by Albert de Courville and Fernando Gomis. It was made at Walton Studios as the Spanish-language version of the British mystery film 77 Park Lane, which was based on the 1928 play by Walter Hackett.

A separate French-language film 77 Rue Chalgrin (also directed by Courville) was also released. Such multiple-language versions were common during the early years of sound. The only actor appearing in the film with a career in the English-speaking world was Helena D'Algy. The Portuguese actress portrays the character played in the other versions by Betty Stockfold and Suzy Piorson. It was one of her last-known roles before two Paramount British productions, respectively the same year and in 1933. The rest of the cast included Alfonso de Granada, Gabriel Algara and Jesús Castro Blanco.

Fernando Gomis Izquierdo was assistant director and dialogue director for this version. The film was a United Artists production.

The film was released in Spain on 21 December 1931 and was shown at the Teatro Lloréns, in Seville, in January 1932, for example. It was theatrically distributed in Argentina in 1932.

== Plot ==
In the Paris of the 1930s, Marie de Vendiers's brother, is a gambler. His debts put his sister in an awkward position. She then meets the Marquess of Cleves.

== Cast ==
The cast included:

- Alfonso de Granada as Marquess of Cleves
- Helena D'Algy as Marie de Vendiers
- Gabriel Algara as Morland
- Jesús Castro Blanco as Paul
- Manuel de Diego as Philippe
- Antonio Gentil as Sinclair
- Pilar González Torres as Eva
- Joaquin Carrasco
- José Sierra de Luna

== Reception ==
A review in Popular Film in 1933 praised the acting.
