= Edith Kelly =

English actress

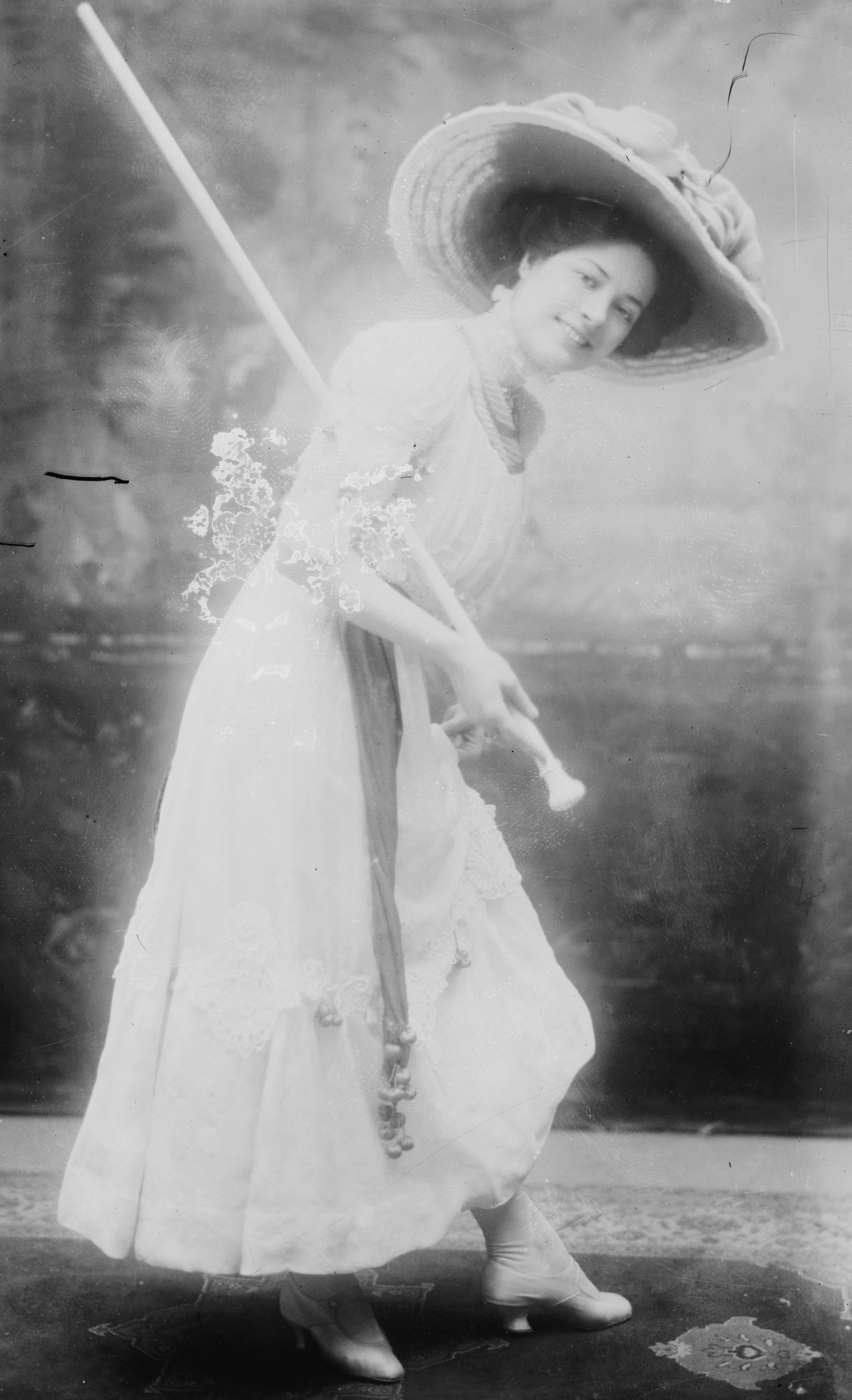
- Edith Kelly in Havana, 1908
- Born: November 9, 1889
- Died: December , 1960; Washington
- Occupation: Actress
- Spouses: Frank Jay Gould (m. 1910; div. 1919) Albert de Courville (m. 1927–1960)
- Relatives: Hetty Kelly (sister)

Edith Kelly (November 9, 1889 – December 1960) was an English actress, best known for her work in the theatre production of Havana in 1908.

== Early life ==
Kelly was born in 1880, to her father who was a window frame maker in Camberwell. She is the older sister to Hetty Kelly who is best known for being the first love of Charlie Chaplin. She also had a brother, Arthur, who was an executive for United Artists, which Chaplin co-founded.

== First marriage ==
Kelly married Frank Jay Gould, the son of Jay Gould, a wealthy American businessman. She and Frank married in 1910 in Scotland and she took his last name of Gould; they moved to Paris, France and remained married for nine years. They divorced in 1919; this divorce was highly publicised within French newspapers due to the amount of money it involved, and the circumstances which caused it. After the divorce was settled in France, she re-opened the case in America in order to increase the financial settlement. She was quoted in the American press advising girls "not to marry the idle rich".

== Second marriage ==
Kelly later remarried the English filmmaker Albert de Courville in 1927. There were fears that this marriage would not happen due to the physical condition de Courville was in before the marriage; he was in hospital. De Courville later recovered sufficiently to allow the marriage to happen on 26 May at a registry office. Kelly remained married to de Courville until her death in December 1960 in Washington, DC.
