= Live in Paris (John Coltrane album) =

1974 live album by John Coltrane

Live album by John Coltrane
- Recorded: July 27–28, 1965
- Length: 1:07:54
- Label: Charly

Live in Paris is an album by jazz musician John Coltrane originally issued as 2 separate volumes in 1974 by BYG Japan and later reissued on CD by Charly Records.

== Background ==
Live in Paris was recorded in the middle of one of Coltrane's busiest summers. On June 28, 1965, he recorded the groundbreaking album Ascension, followed by New Thing at Newport four days later. This was followed by a two-week double bill with Thelonious Monk's quartet at the Village Gate from July 6–18.

Coltrane and his quartet then embarked on a one-week tour of Europe, playing at the sixth International Jazz Festival at Juan-les-Pins in Antibes, France on July 26 and 27, followed by a concert at the Salle Pleyel in Paris on July 28, and winding up with a performance at a jazz festival in Comblain-la-Tour, Belgium on August 1. The July 26 concert, on which Coltrane shared billing with Jimmy McGriff, featured one of only two live performances of A Love Supreme, a 48-minute version which took up the entire program. (A recording of this performance appears on the 2002 Deluxe Edition and the 2015 Super Deluxe Edition of A Love Supreme.) The following day, at the request of the festival, Coltrane performed material that was more familiar to the audience. The versions of "Naima" and "Impressions" on Live in Paris were recorded that day. The remaining tracks, "Blue Valse", "Afro-Blue", and a second version of "Impressions", were recorded at the July 28 concert in Paris. ("Blue Valse" is actually a quartet version of "Ascension", and was mis-titled due to a miscommunication with concert personnel.)

Some of the music recorded in France during the tour was also released in 1988 on Live in Antibes.

The July–August 1965 tour marked Coltrane's last appearance in Europe.

On the tour, during breaks, Coltrane frequently "remained... in his hotel room, practicing as usual, playing along to a tape of an [Albert] Ayler concert."

== Reception ==
Professional ratings
Review scores
Source	Rating
AllMusic	4.5/5 stars
The Penguin Guide to Jazz	3.5/4 stars

In a review for AllMusic, Stephen Cook wrote that Live in Paris shows Coltrane "dismissing solo structure in favor of volcanic flights", and said that his performance on "Naima" was "one of his most beautiful and emotionally bare solos." He stated: "This disc provides a valuable document of Coltrane's playing during a fertile and protean period (one of many)."

== Track listing ==
Original CD release (mastered from a vinyl source) Live in Paris (Affinity CHARLY 87).

1. "Naima" - 7:14
2. "Impressions" - 11:18
3. "Blue Valse” - 22:42 (mis-titled track; the actual piece is "Ascension")
4. "Afro-Blue” - 11:01
5. "Impressions” - 16:15

Tracks 1 and 2 were recorded on July 27, 1965 at the Antibes Jazz Festival. Tracks 3, 4, and 5 were recorded on July 28, 1965 at the Salle Pleyel, Paris, France.

== Personnel ==
- John Coltrane — tenor saxophone/soprano saxophone
- McCoy Tyner — piano
- Jimmy Garrison — double bass
- Elvin Jones — drums
