= Live in Antibes =

Live album by John Coltrane
- Released: 1988
- Recorded: July 27–28, 1965
- Venues: Juan-Les-Pins Jazz Festival, Antibes, Alpes-Maritimes, Provence-Alpes-Côte d'Azur, France
- Genre: Jazz
- Label: France's Concert

Live in Antibes is a live album by jazz musician John Coltrane that was released in 1988 on the France's Concert label.

== Background ==
Live in Antibes was recorded in the middle of one of Coltrane's busiest summers. On June 28, 1965, he recorded the groundbreaking album Ascension, followed by New Thing at Newport four days later. This was followed by a two-week double bill with Thelonious Monk's quartet at the Village Gate from July 6–18.

Coltrane and his quartet then embarked on a one-week tour of Europe, playing at the sixth International Jazz Festival at Juan-les-Pins in Antibes, France on July 26 and 27, followed by a concert at the Salle Pleyel in Paris on July 28, and winding up with a performance at a jazz festival in Comblain-la-Tour, Belgium on August 1. The July 26 concert, on which Coltrane shared billing with Jimmy McGriff, featured a live performance of A Love Supreme, a 48-minute version which took up the entire program. (A recording of this concert appears on the 2002 Deluxe Edition and the 2015 Super Deluxe Edition of A Love Supreme.) The following day, at the request of the festival, Coltrane performed material that was more familiar to the audience. The versions of "Naima", "Blue Valse" and "My Favorite Things" on Live in Antibes were recorded that day. The remaining tracks, "Impressions" and "Afro-Blue", were recorded at the July 28 concert in Paris. ("Blue Valse" is actually a quartet version of "Ascension", and was mis-titled due to a miscommunication with concert personnel.)

Some of the music recorded in France during the tour was also released in 1974 on Live in Paris.

The July–August 1965 tour marked Coltrane's last appearance in Europe.

On the tour, during breaks, Coltrane frequently "remained... in his hotel room, practicing as usual, playing along to a tape of an [Albert] Ayler concert."

== Reception ==
Professional ratings
Review scores
Source	Rating
AllMusic	4.5/5 stars
The Penguin Guide to Jazz	2.5/4 stars

In a review for AllMusic, Ron Wynn wrote: "Vital, transitional John Coltrane with the quartet near its end; this 1965 Antibes concert may have featured familiar material ('Naima,' 'My Favorite Things,' 'Afro Blue,' and 'Impressions' are among the five selections), but that is the only thing that linked it with the ensemble's past offerings. Coltrane's tenor is frenetic, as he turns song structure inside out, honks, soars, and explores, seeking fresh directions and alternative statements within each blistering solo. Likewise, this version of 'My Favorite Things' has an edgy, unfulfilled quality, while even 'Naima' is more inquisitive than satisfying. While it's still incredible, pivotal music, there is also the realization that change was near and inevitable."

The authors of the Penguin Guide to Jazz Recordings commented: "the sound quality is... rather poor, but the performances are very good indeed."

== Track listing ==
1. "Presentation" – 0:50
2. "Naima" – 6:55
3. "Blue Valse" – 15:00
4. "My Favorite Things" – 17:20
5. "Impressions" – 16:00
6. "Afro Blue" – 10:30

Tracks 1, 2, 3, and 4 were recorded on July 27, 1965, at the Antibes Jazz Festival. Tracks 5 and 6 were recorded on July 28, 1965, at the Salle Pleyel, Paris, France.

== Personnel ==
- John Coltrane — tenor saxophone/soprano saxophone
- McCoy Tyner — piano
- Jimmy Garrison — double bass
- Elvin Jones — drums
