= 77 Rue Chalgrin =

1931 British film by Albert de Courville

- Directed by: Albert de Courville
- Written by: Michael Powell
- Based on: 77 Park Lane, a 1928 play by Walter Hackett
- Starring: Jean Murat; Léon Bary; Suzy Pierson
- Cinematography: Geoffrey Faithfull; Mutz Greenbaum
- Release date: 17 November 1931
- Running time: 95 minutes
- Country: United Kingdom
- Language: French

77 Rue Chalgrin is a 1931 mystery film directed by Albert de Courville and starring Jean Murat, Léon Bary and Suzy Pierson. It was made as the French-language version of the British film 77 Park Lane, based on a 1928 play by Walter Hackett. It was shot at Walton Studios near London.

== Cast ==
- Jean Murat as Le baron de Cléves
- Léon Bary as Morland
- Suzy Pierson as Suzanne de Vandières
- Lucette Desmoulins as Lucette
- Victor Vina as Paul
- Paul Menant as Sinclair
- Pierre Nay as Carrington
- Marc Dantzer as Philippe
- Robert Cuperly as Donovan
- Max Lerel as George Malton
- Raymond Destac as Le commissaire

== Bibliography ==
- Bock, Hans-Michael & Bergfelder, Tim. The Concise Cinegraph: Encyclopaedia of German Cinema. Berghahn Books, 2009.
