= Edgar Horne =

British businessman and Unionist politician (1856 – 1941)

Horne in 1910

Sir William Edgar Horne, 1st Baronet (21 January 1856 – 26 September 1941) was a British businessman and Unionist politician. A surveyor and a director of numerous companies, he was best known for his role as chairman of the Prudential Assurance Company from 1928 to 1941.

== Family ==
Horne was the son of Edgar Horne (1820–1905) of Witley in Surrey and his wife Maria, the widow of Thomas Everfield; his father had been head of the Prudential Assurance Company for many years, and his estate was valued on his death at £565,407.

He was married in 1886 to Margery May (died 1939), the daughter of Mr. G. A. May of Elford in Staffordshire. They had two sons (twins, Alan Edgar and W. Guy, born in 1889) and a daughter.

== Career ==
Edgar Horne was educated at Westminster School, before entering his father's firm of auctioneers and surveyors, Messrs Horne and Company, which was based in the City of London. He was consulting surveyor on the widening of Whitehall, ran the firm even before his father's death, and subsequently became a director of Prudential from about 1904 and deputy chairman in 1917, then chairman from 1928 until his death in 1941. He was a member of the council of the British Overseas Bank, president of the Surveyor's Institution (1911), and vice-president of the National Service League. He was also chairman of the Guildford and West Surrey Agricultural Association, a governor of Westminster Hospital and of his alma mater, Westminster School He was a generous benefactor to the school, donating to it the building of No. 17 Dean's yard, and was involved in the establishment of the Old Westminsters association for former pupils of the school.

He entered local government, becoming chairman of the united vestries of St Margarets and St Johns, Westminster, and then served as a member of Westminster Borough Council, where he was Mayor in 1924.

At the 1906 general election Horne stood unsuccessfully as a Unionist candidate in the Barnstaple division of Devon, a safe seat for the Liberal Party. At the January 1910 general election he was elected as the Member of Parliament (MP) for the Guildford division of Surrey. He was re-elected in December 1910, and was returned at the 1918 general election as a Coalition Unionist. He stood from the House of Commons at the 1922 general election.

In the 1929 New Year Honours list, which had been delayed until March owing to the illness of King George V, it was announced that Horne was to be made a Baronet "for public and political services". The title was conferred on 30 March, with a territorial designation of "Shackleford, in the County of Surrey".

Horne owned a sporting estate at Lairg in Sutherland, but lived in Hall Place, Shackleford, in Surrey. The estate included a lake and nearly all of the village. It covered 204 acres (0.8 km^{2}) and was put up for sale after the death in 1939 of Lady Horne. The agents described it as "a gentleman's pleasure farm". The Times reported that Lady Hall had "made the garden of Hall Place one of the prettiest in Surrey". However, a buyer had not been found by the following year, and Horne decided instead to let the house unfurnished, and sell the remaining land. The house was leased to a preparatory school called Aldro, which bought the freehold after his death, and the rest of the land was sold separately.

He died on 26 September 1941, aged 85.

Parliament of the United Kingdom
Preceded by William Henry Cowan	Member of Parliament for Guildford; January 1910 – 1922	Succeeded by Henry Buckingham
Baronetage of the United Kingdom
New creation	Baronet (of Shackleford, Surrey); 1929–1941	Succeeded by Alan Edgar Horne
