= Finley Johnson Shepard =

American railway executive

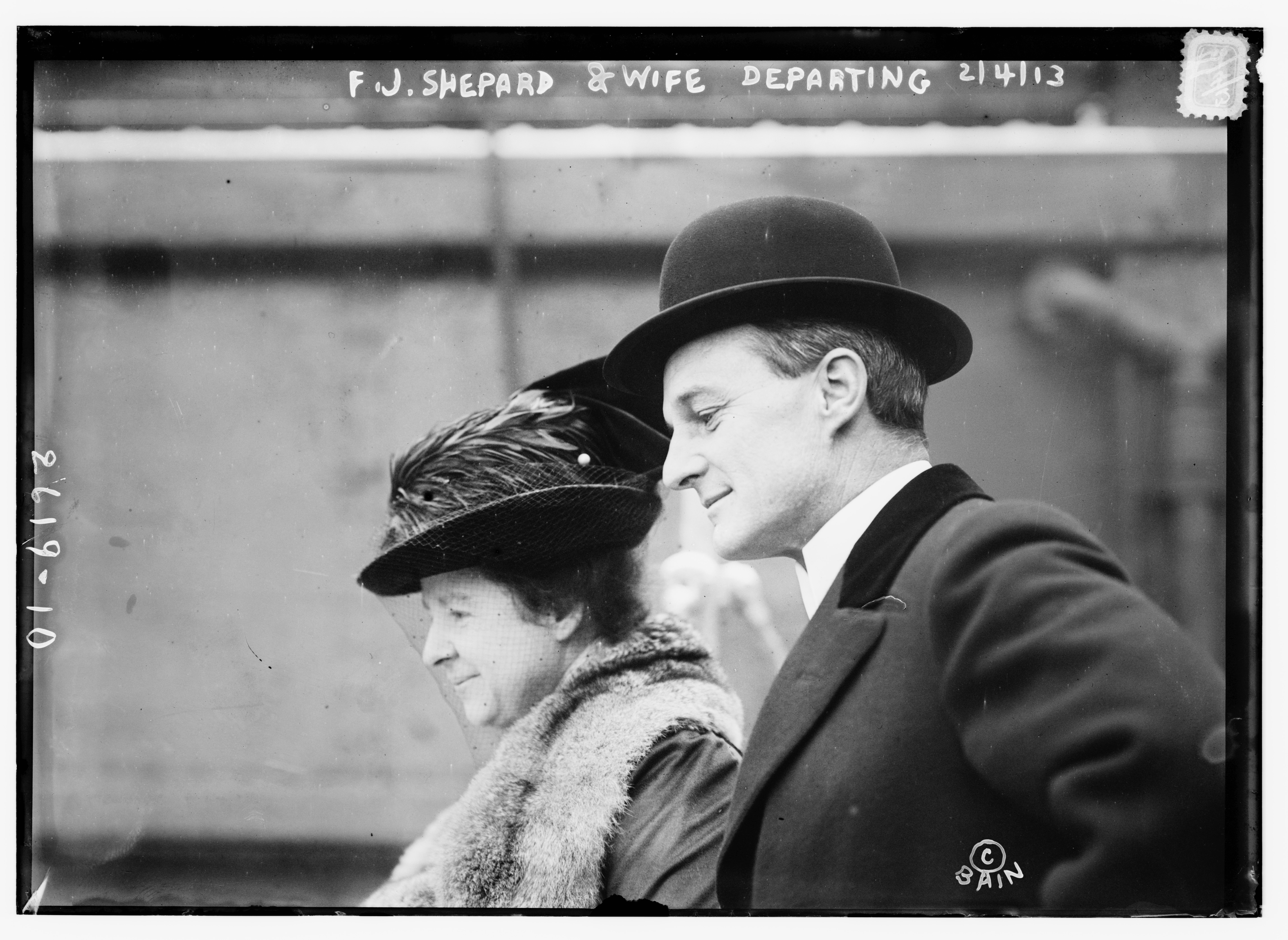
Finley Johnson Shepard and Helen Miller Gould, 1913

Finley Johnson Shepard (October 8, 1867 – August 22, 1942) was an American executive at the Missouri Pacific Railroad.

He was born in Manhattan, New York City. He married Helen Miller Gould, the daughter of Jay Gould. He died on August 22, 1942, at Roosevelt Hospital in Manhattan, New York City.
