= Frank Jay Gould =

American businessman (1877–1956)

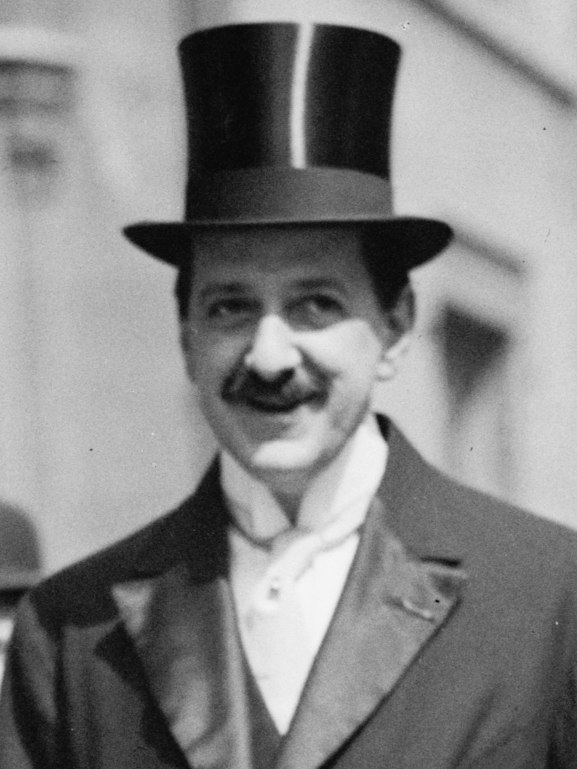
- Born: December 4, 1877; New York City, US
- Died: April 1, 1956 (aged 78); Juan-les-Pins, France
- Education: New York University (1899)
- Spouses: Helen Margaret Kelly (m. 1901; div. 1908) Edith Kelly (m. 1910; div. 1919) Florence La Caze (m. 1923)
- Children: 2, including Dorothy Gould Burns
- Parent(s): Jay Gould; Helen Day Miller
- Relatives: siblings: George Jay Gould; Edwin Gould Sr.; Helen Gould; Howard Gould; Anna Gould

Frank Jay Gould (December 4, 1877 – April 1, 1956) was a philanthropist and a member of the wealthy Gould family. He was the owner of French Riviera casinos and hotels.

== Biography ==
He was born on December 4, 1877, in Manhattan, New York City to Jay Gould and Helen Day Miller (1838–1889).

On December 1, 1901, he married Helen Margaret Kelly and had two daughters, Helen Gould and Dorothy Gould (1904–1969). They divorced in 1908. The Wichita Daily Times, Wichita Falls, Texas, wrote: "Frank Jay Gould and his wife who was Helen Margaret Kelly have separated and it is said Mrs. Gould has brought action looking for a legal separation. Jealousy on the part of Mr. Gould, due, it is said, to the homage paid Mrs. Gould, who is a beautiful woman, by other men." In 1909 he was sued by vaudeville dancer Bessie De Voie for breach of promise, and his love letters to her were published as part of the scandal. The case was settled in late 1910, when Gould paid De Voie $10,000.

Gould married his second wife, Edith Kelly, in 1910, divorcing in 1919. Edith was the sister of Hetty Kelly, who was Charlie Chaplin's first true love. Gould was married to his third wife, Florence La Caze (1895–1983), from 1923 until his death. Together Gould and La Caze collected Impressionist artworks.

In 1909, he founded the "Virginia Railway and Power Company" in Richmond, Virginia. The company would be renamed "Virginia Electric and Power Company", and known widely by its acronym (VEPCO) in 1925. The company became "Virginia Power" in the 1980s and operates today under the name Dominion Resources, serving Virginia, North Carolina with electric power and half a dozen other Middle Atlantic states providing natural gas services.

He moved to France and developed several casinos and hotels on the French Riviera. He made a great contribution in the development of multiple spa towns including Granville, Bagnoles-de-l'Orne and Juan-les-Pins. In 1926 he opened the Hotel "Le Provençal" in Juan-les-Pins. Gould himself lived in the Villa La Vigie, which he had bought in 1927.

He died on April 1, 1956, in Juan-les-Pins.

== Legacy ==
The history of his investments in France is described in the documentary film Hotel Provençal (2000), by German filmmaker Lutz Hachmeister.

Frank Jay Gould's art collection of 200 Impressionist and modern paintings was auctioned at Sotheby's after the death of the widow Florence Gould in 1983. Old master paintings, furniture, decorative objects and jewels were also sold at other auctions.
