= Albert de Courville =

British film director (1887–1960)

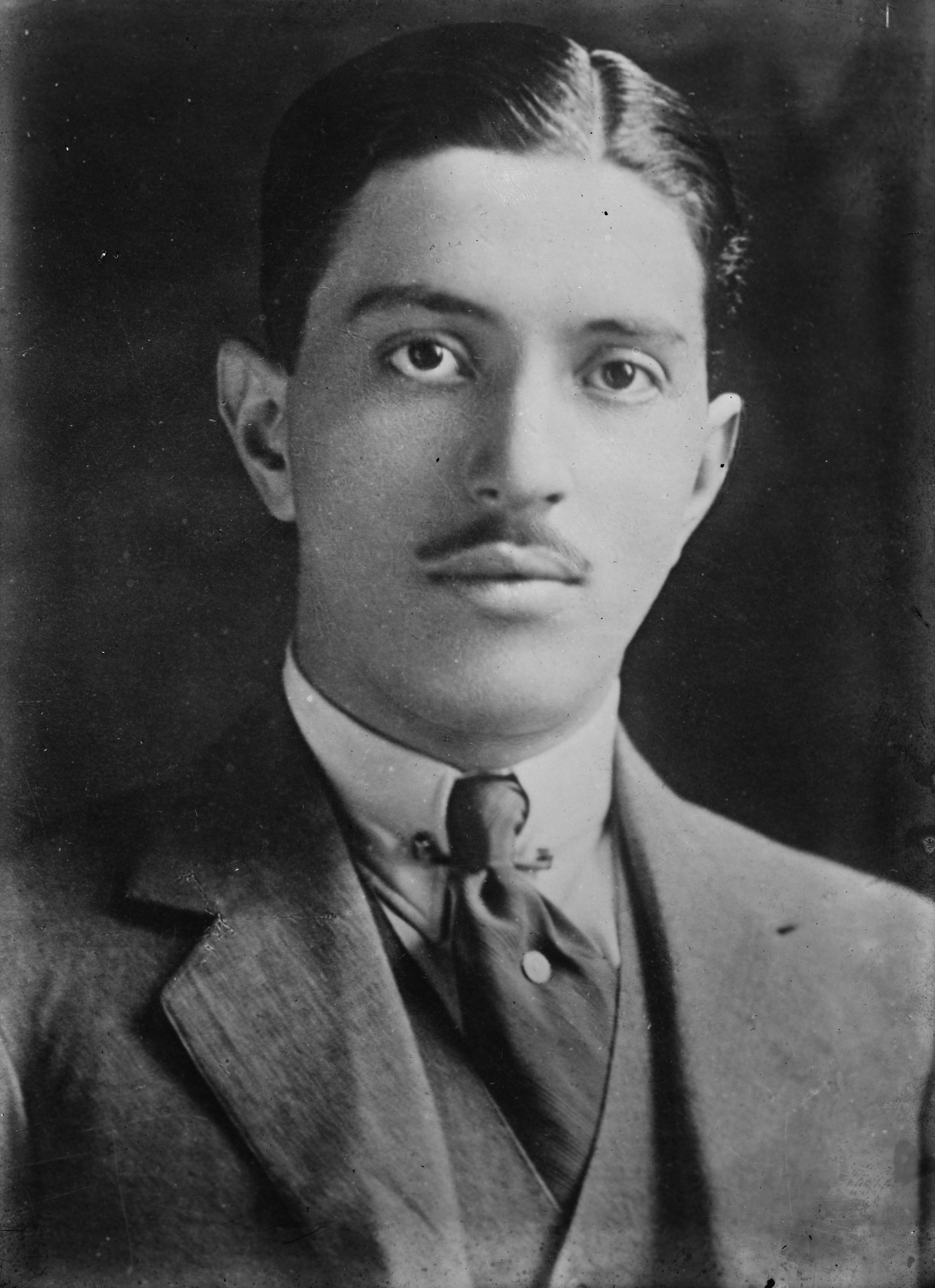
- Albert de Courville in 1916
- Born: 26 March 1887; Croydon, England
- Died: March 1960 (aged 72–73); London, England
- Occupations: Writer; journalist; film director
- Spouses: Shirley Kellogg (m. 1913; div. 1924) Edith Kelly (m. 1927–1960)

Albert Pierre de Courville (26 March 1887 – March 1960; born in Croydon, England) was a writer and director of theatrical revues, many of which featured the actress and singer Shirley Kellogg, whom he married in June 1913. He began his career as a journalist and later in his career got into filmmaking.

== Career ==
In about 1907 he began work in London as a journalist with the Evening News. A good reporter, he was soon earning as much as £20 a week, but thought there were more possibilities, and money, in the theatre.

He joined forces with London impresario Sir Edward Moss and staged revues at the London Hippodrome. In 1914 his revue Business as Usual featured several patriotic numbers following the outbreak of the First World War including "Are we Downhearted?" and "When We've Wound Up the Watch on the Rhine".

In the 1930s he turned to making films. His two most famous films, both featuring Jessie Matthews were There Goes the Bride (1932) and The Midshipmaid (1932). He also directed The Wrecker, an adaptation of Arnold Ridley’s play of the same name, and Seven Sinners (1936).

== Personal life ==
In June 1913, he married actress and singer Shirley Kellogg. They divorced in 1924.

He and the actress Edith Kelly married in 1927. There were fears that this marriage would not happen as de Courville was in hospital before the marriage. De Courville recovered sufficiently to allow the marriage to happen on 26 May at a registry office.

== Selected filmography ==
Year	Title	Director	Writer	Notes
1930	Wolves	Yes		
1931	77 Park Lane	Yes		
1931	77 Rue Chalgrin	Yes		
1932	Entre noche y día	Yes		
1932	Under the Leather Helmet	Yes		Original title:Sous le casque de cuir
1932	There Goes the Bride	Yes		
1932	The Midshipmaid	Yes		
1932	Between Night and Day	Yes		
1933	This Is the Life	Yes		
1934	Wild Boy	Yes	Yes	
1935	Things Are Looking Up	Yes	Yes	
1935	The Case of Gabriel Perry	Yes		
1935	Charing Cross Road	Yes		
1936	Seven Sinners	Yes		
1936	Strangers on Honeymoon	Yes		
1937	Clothes and the Woman	Yes		
1938	The Rebel Son	Yes		uncredited
1938	Star of the Circus	Yes		
1938	Oh Boy!	Yes		
1938	Crackerjack	Yes		
1939	The Lambeth Walk	Yes		
1940	An Englishman's Home	Yes		
