= Horne baronets =

Baronetcy in the Baronetage of the United Kingdom

The Horne Baronetcy, of Shackleford in the County of Surrey, is a title in the Baronetage of the United Kingdom. It was created on 25 March 1929 for Edgar Horne. He was Chairman of the Prudential Assurance Company and also represented Guildford in the House of Commons as a Unionist.

== Horne baronets, of Shackleford (1929) ==
Escutcheon of the Horne baronets of Shackleford

- Sir (William) Edgar Horne, 1st Baronet (1856–1941)
- Sir Alan Edgar Horne, 2nd Baronet (1889–1984)
- Sir (Alan) Gray Antony Horne, 3rd Baronet (born 1948)

There is no heir to the baronetcy.
