= Helen Margaret Kelly =

American socialite (1884–1952)

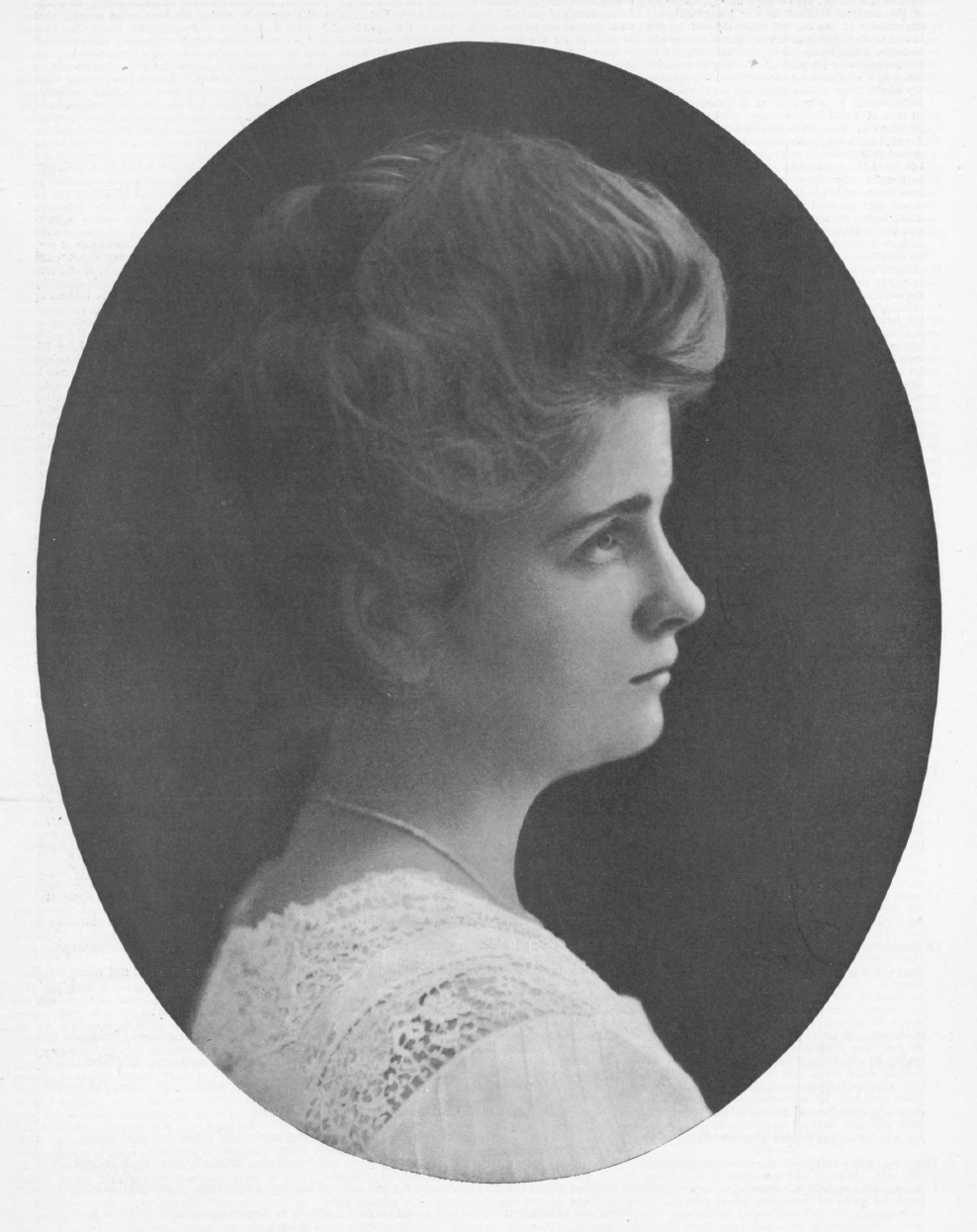
Helen Margaret Kelly. ca. 1901

Helen Margaret Kelly (1884 – August 2, 1952), also known as Princess Vlora of Albania during her third marriage, was an American socialite.

She was born in 1884 to Edward Kelly. She was the granddaughter of Eugene Kelly, a wealthy banker. On December 1, 1901, she married Frank Jay Gould. They had two daughters, Helen Gould (b. 1902) and Dorothy Gould (1904–69), but divorced in 1908. The Wichita Daily Times in Wichita Falls, Texas, wrote, "Frank Jay Gould and his wife who was Helen Margaret Kelly have separated and it is said Mrs. Gould has brought action looking for a legal separation. Jealousy on the part of Mr. Gould, due, it is said, to the homage paid Mrs. Gould, who is a beautiful woman, by other men."

In 1910, she married Ralph Hill Thomas (1882–1914) the nephew of the president of American Sugar Refining Company. On June 20, 1917, she married Prince Nuredin Vlora from Albania (belonging to the Albanian Vlora dynasty), they divorced in 1922. She married her fourth husband, Oscar M. Burke, president of the Manhattan Soap Company, on January 4, 1926. She died on August 2, 1952, in France.
