= Florence Gould =

American writer and salonnière

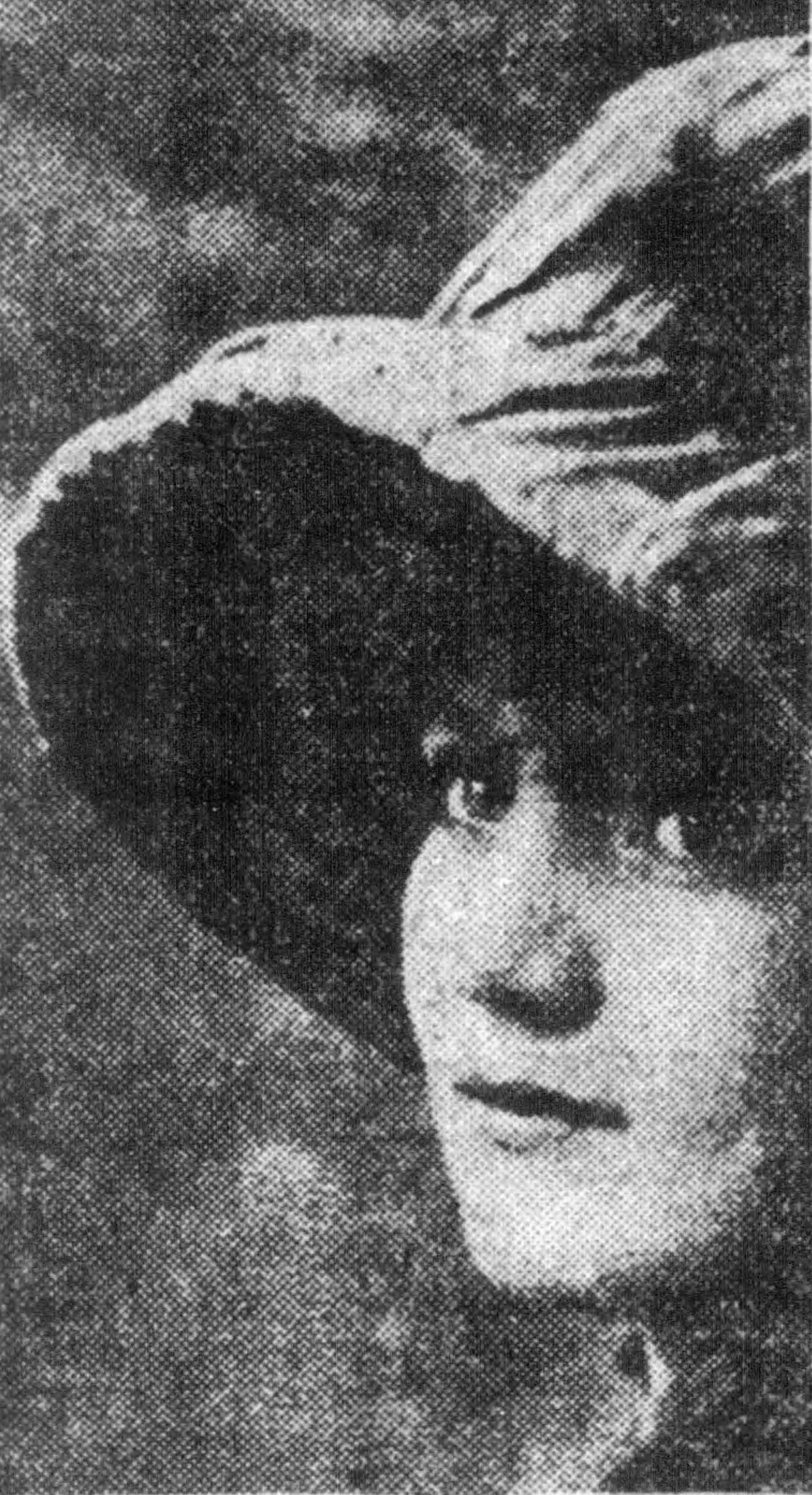
Florence Gould c. 1915

Florence Lacaze Gould (July 1, 1895 – February 28, 1983) was an American writer and salon-holder who became involved in a money laundering plot before creating a legacy as a patron of the arts at institutions such as the Metropolitan Museum of Art. She held a salon during the German occupation of Paris and entertained many French intellectuals, such as Marcel Jouhandeau, Jean Paulhan, Paul Léautaud, Louis-Ferdinand Céline, and German officers, such as the writer Ernst Jünger, and narrowly escaped high treason charges in 1945.

Florence Lacaze was born in America to French parents; her father was Maximilien Lacaze, a French publisher. She married once. Her second marriage was as the third wife of the fabulously rich Frank Jay Gould in 1923.

Gould hosted salons in their French residences since the 1920s, as she and her husband collected French Impressionist paintings. They also kept an open marriage, which allowed her to take lovers such as Charlie Chaplin.

The couple owned a gambling casino and several hotels and restaurants. These allowed them to move money from Nazis, which caused her to be charged but not found guilty of treason by the US government.

She also founded the following prizes:

- the Critics Prize
- The Max Jacob Poetry Prize
- The Roger Nimier Prize for literature
- The Engraving Prize and the Musical Composition Prize

Florence Gould villa "El Patio" in Cannes (9 boulevard Eugène-Gazagnaire) was invaded by armed, masked robbers in August 1978. They tied up Gould and escaped with $750,000 worth of jewelry.
