= Juan-les-Pins =

Juan-les-Pins Joan dei Pins (Occitan)
- Town
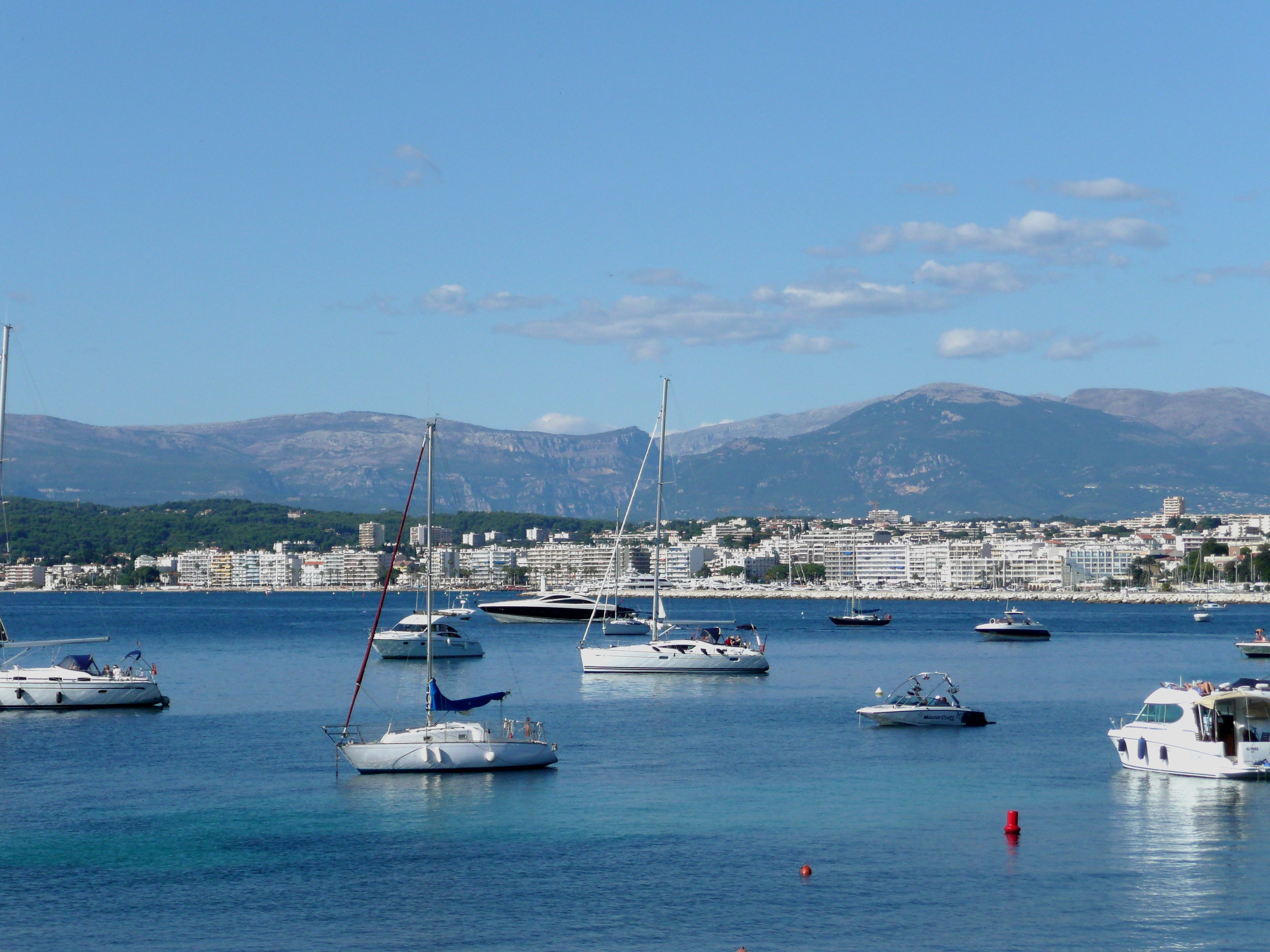
- Juan-les-Pins seen from the Cap d'Antibes

- Location within Provence-Alpes-Côte d'Azur Juan-les-Pins (France)
- Coordinates: 43°34′16″N 7°06′34″E
- Country: France
- Region: Provence-Alpes-Côte d'Azur
- Department: Alpes-Maritimes
- Arrondissement: Grasse
- Canton: Antibes-1
- Municipality: Antibes
- Elevation: 10 m (33 ft)

Population
  - Total: 60,000
- Time zone: UTC+1 (CET)
- Postal code: 06600

Juan-les-Pins (French pronunciation: [ʒɥɑ̃ le pɛ̃]; Occitan: Joan dei Pins or Joan dels Pins) is a town in the French commune of Antibes, located in the department of Alpes-Maritimes, and the region of Provence-Alpes-Côte d'Azur, Southeastern France. Located on the French Riviera, it is situated between Nice and Cannes, 13 kilometres (8 mi) to the southwest of Nice Côte d'Azur Airport. Juan-les-Pins is a major holiday destination popular with the international jet set, with a casino, nightclubs and beaches. It is served by Juan-les-Pins station on the Marseille–Ventimiglia railway.

== History ==
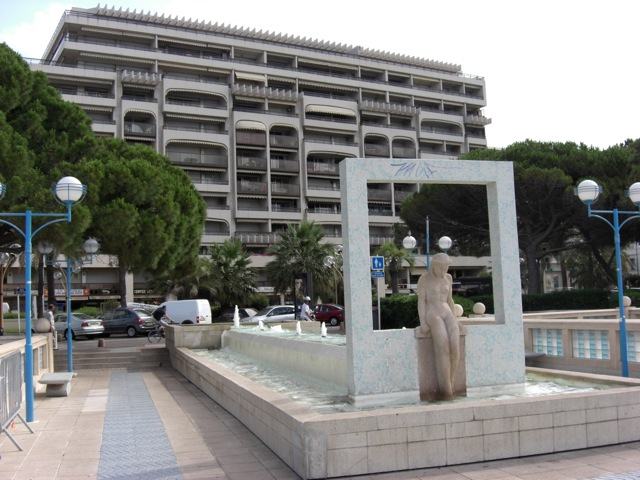
La Baigneuse by Alfonse Grebel on Avenue Guy de Maupassant

Situated west of the town of Antibes on the western slope of the ridge, halfway to the old fishery village of Golfe-Juan (where Napoleon landed in 1815), it had been an area with many stone pine trees (pins in French), where the inhabitants of Antibes used to go for a promenade, for a picnic in the shadow of the stone pine trees or to collect tree branches and cones for their stoves.

The village was given the name Juan-les-Pins on 12 March 1882. The spelling Juan, used instead of the customary French spelling, Jean, derives from the local Occitan dialect. Other names discussed for the town include Héliopolis, Antibes-les-Pins and Albany-les-Pins (after the Duke of Albany, the fourth son of Queen Victoria).

The following year, 1883, it was decided to build a railway station in Juan-les-Pins on the Paris–Lyon–Méditerranée (PLM) line that had been there since 1863.

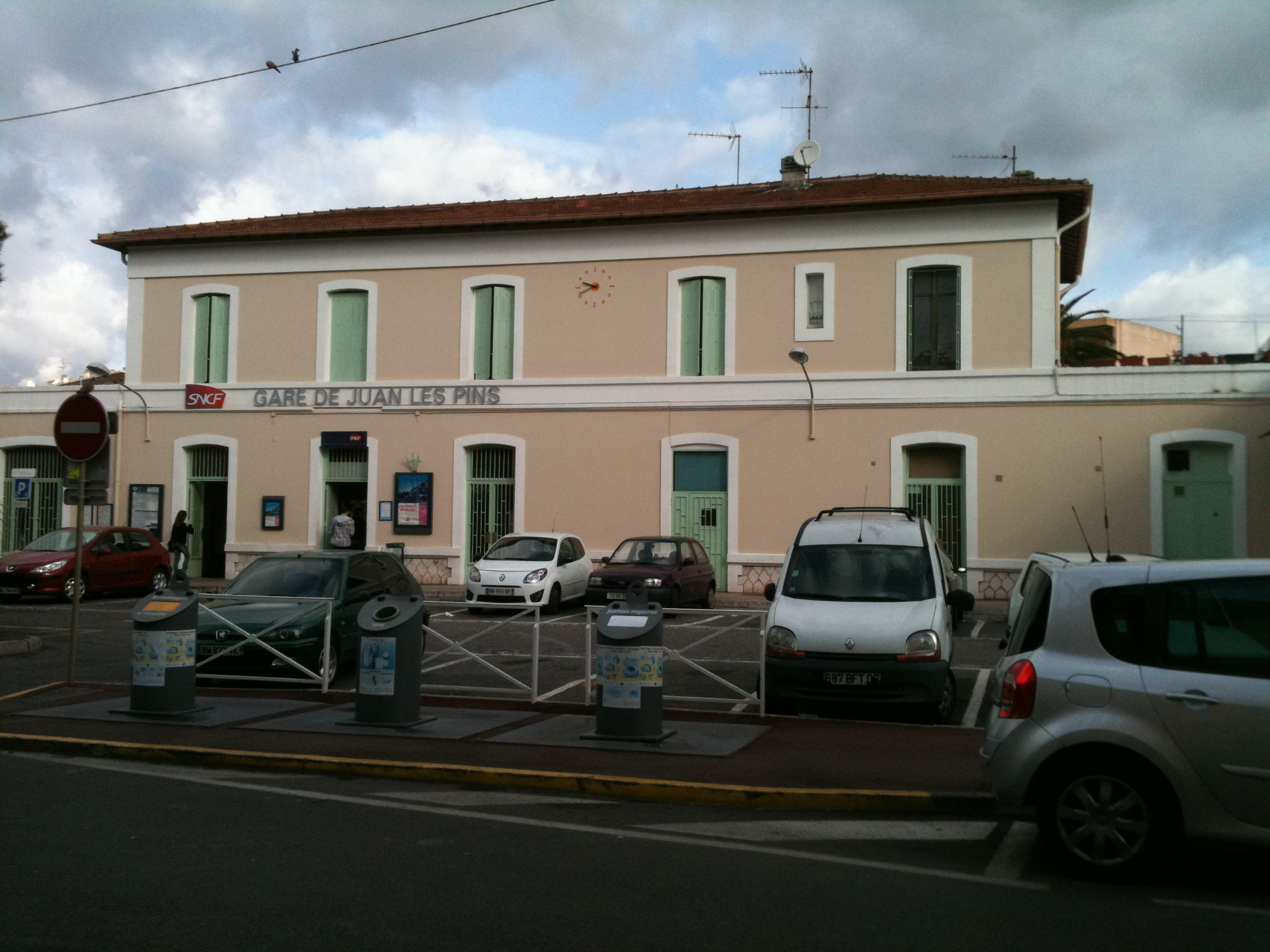
Exterior of Juan-les-Pins train station.

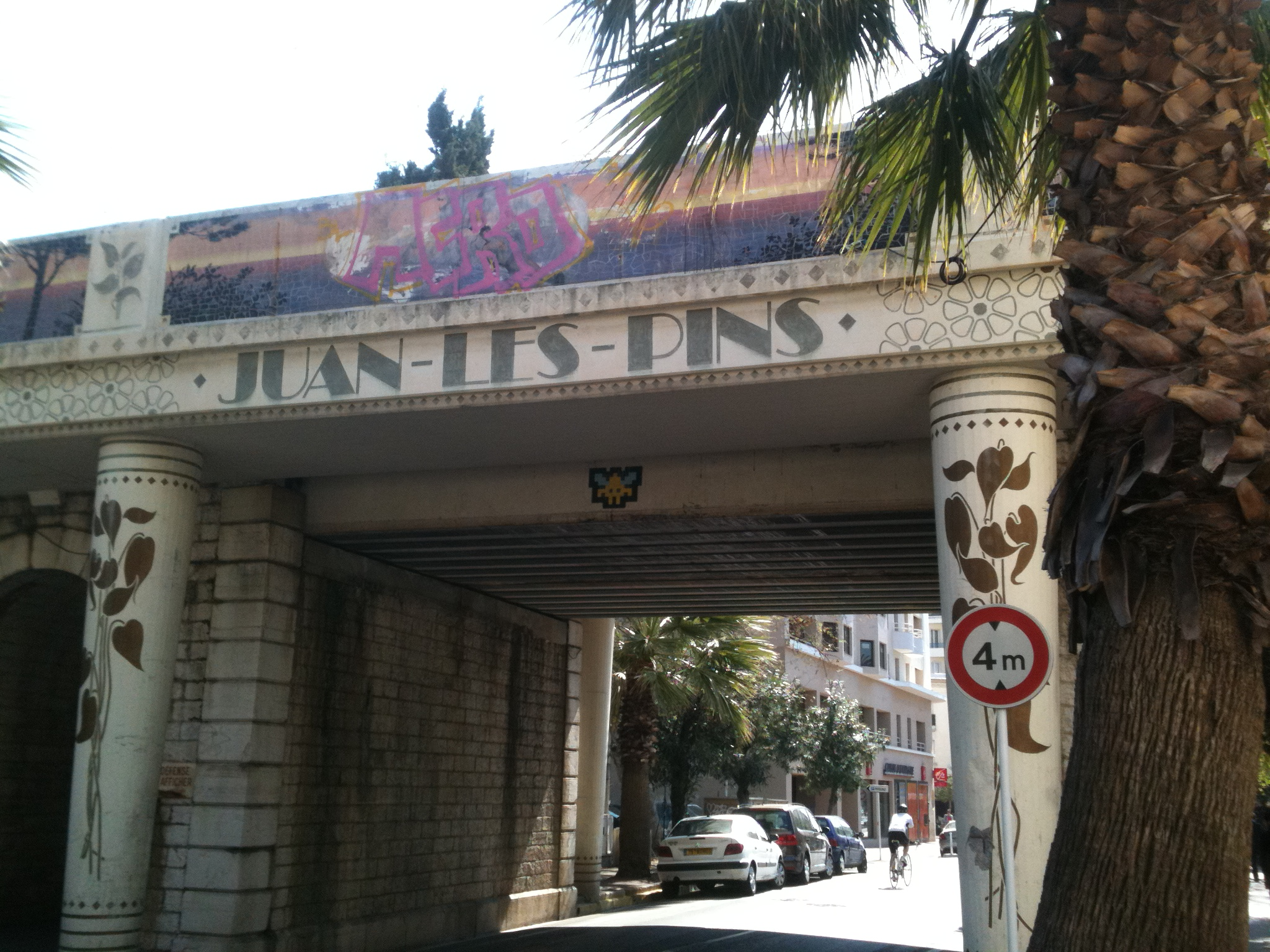
Railway bridge on Ave. Amiral Courbet, Juan les Pins

In 1927, the Hôtel Provençal, also known as Le Provençal, was completed for the American businessman Frank Jay Gould. It later became one of Juan-les-Pins' best-known luxury hotels, receiving guests such as Charlie Chaplin, Lilian Harvey, Jack L. Warner and Man Ray.

== Jazz à Juan ==
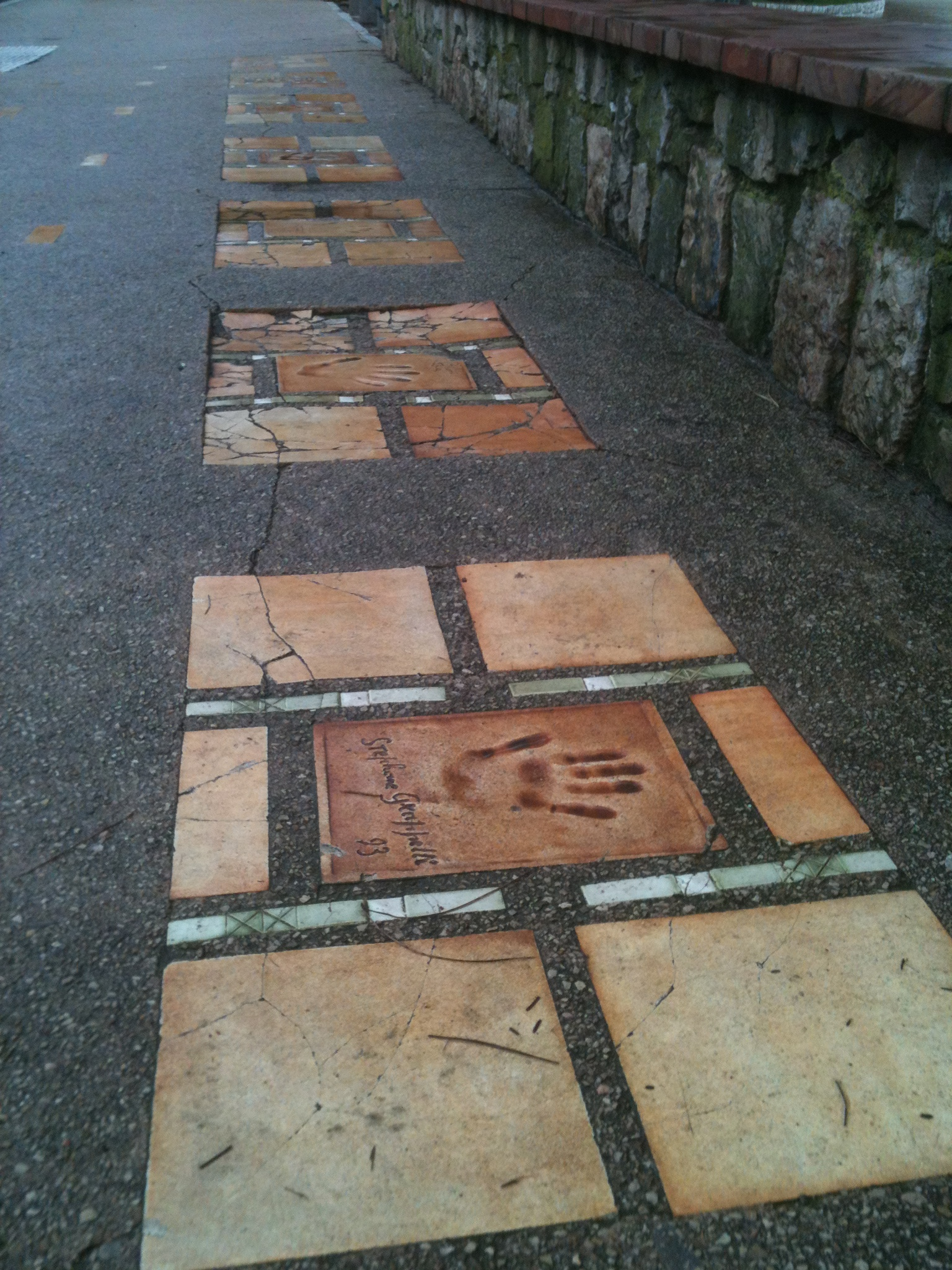
Hand impressions of performers at Jazz à Juan festival on Boulevard Edouard Baudoin, Juan les Pins

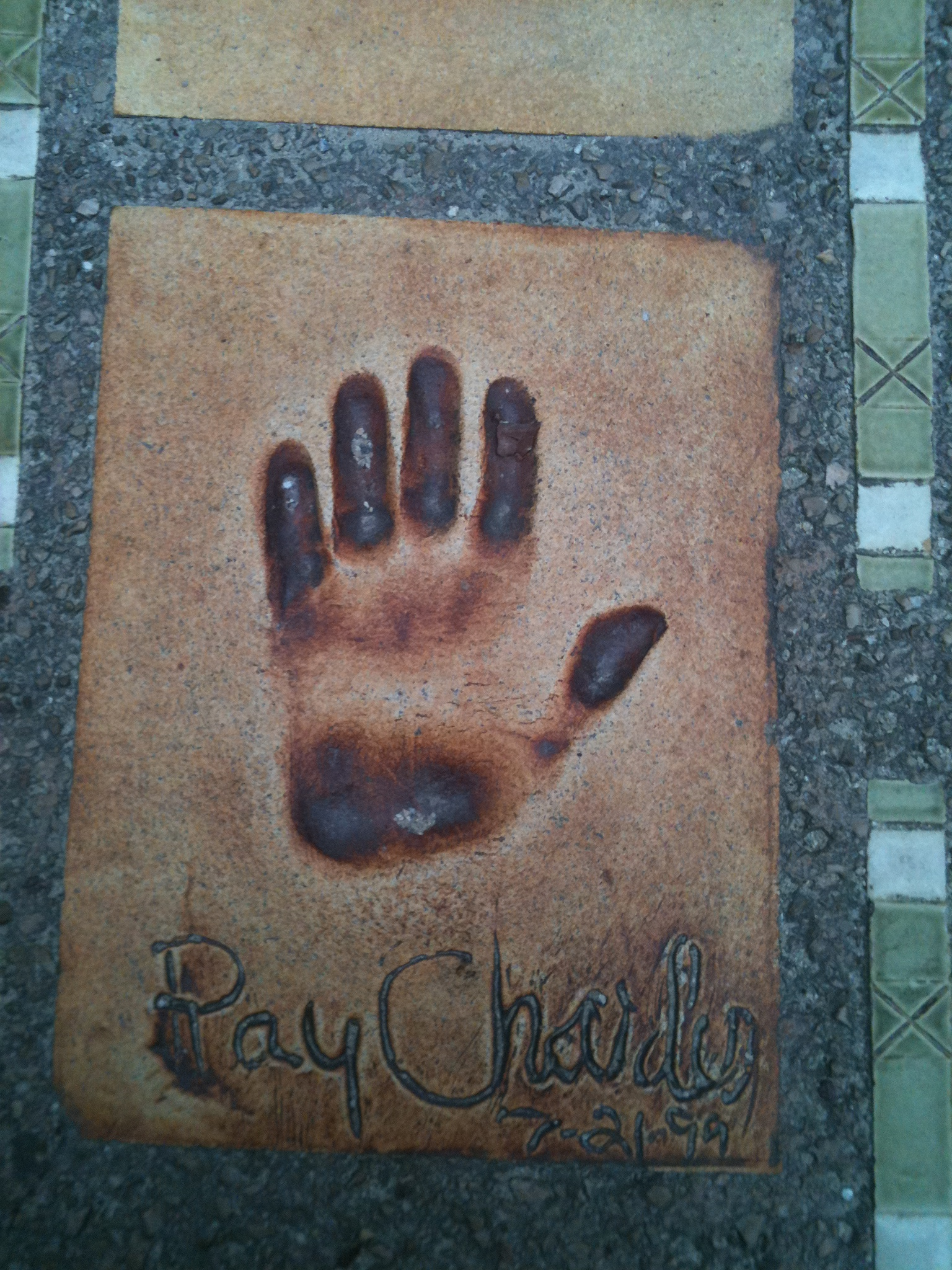
Ray Charles' hand impression on Boulevard Edouard Baudoin, Juan les Pins

== Points of interest ==
- Jardin botanique de la Villa Thuret
- Aujourd'hui, curvy modernistic seaside former beach house of movie mogul Jack L. Warner
- Home of the 6 Jours d'Antibes, the Antibes 6 Day Race.
- 5, Rue Jacques Leonetti, 06160, Antibes, the address of the world's first Discothèque, in 1947, (now demolished), opened by Paul Pacini, (died 12/12/'17), ((later of Cannes Radio)), the 'Whisky à GoGo'; (the name taken from the 'Galore', in Whisky Galore (novel), published the same year, by Compton Mackenzie.

== Personalities ==
- Frank Jay Gould
- Avery Hopwood
- Gerald Murphy
- Georges Milton

== Twin towns ==
- New Orleans (United States)
